= Pure verbs =

Greek language word subclass

Pure verbs, or vocalic verbs, are those verbs of the Greek language that have their word stem ending in a vowel (monophthong or diphthong).

== Origins ==
The Greek pure verbs can be assigned to several derivational types in the preceding Proto-Indo-European language:

Most of the verbs in -αω are derived from nominal ā-stems by forming the present tense with the suffix -i̯e-/-i̯o-: νικάω < *νῑκᾱ-i̯o- 'to win, prevail', from νίκα 'victory'; τιμάω < *τῑμᾱ-i̯o- 'to honor, revere', from τιμά 'honor'. A few verbs of this class underived verbs, e.g. δράω 'to do', σπάω 'to draw, pull'.

Verbs in -εω are derived from a range of nominal stems: φιλέω < *φιλε-i̯o- 'to love', from φίλος 'dear, beloved'; τελέω < *τελεσ-i̯o- 'to finish', from τέλος 'target, destination'; φωνέω < *φωνε-i̯o- 'to make a sound', from φονή 'sound'; μαρτυρέω < *μαρτυρε-i̯o- 'to testify', from μάρτυς 'witness'. Examples for underived verbs in this class are: ῥέω < *ῥεϝω 'to flow', ζέω < *ζεσω 'to boil'.

The verbs in -οω are mainly factitives derived from nominal o-stems: δηλόω 'to clarify, reveal', from δῆλος 'clear, obvious', δουλόω 'to enslave, conquer', from δοῦλος 'servant, slave'.

The verbs in -ιω are derived from nominal i-stems: μηνίω 'to be angry', from μῆνις 'anger, wrath'.

Among the verbs in -υω, there are underived ones, e.g. φύω 'to produce, issue', as well as some denominal verbs derived from u-stems, e.g. μεθύω 'to be drunk', from μέθυ 'wine'.

The verbs in -ευω are derived from nominal consonant stems: παιδεύω 'to educate', from παῖς 'child', δουλεύω 'to serve, to be a slave', from δοῦλος 'servant, slave'.

The verbs in -αιω are derived with the -i̯e-/-i̯o-suffix from roots ending in u̯: καίω < *καϝ-i̯o- 'to burn'; κλαίω < *κλαϝ-i̯o- 'to weep, wail'.

== Conjugation ==
The following tables show the conjugated forms of the pure verb λῡ́ειν 'to solve; to free; to destroy' in classical Attic Greek.

| Present | Indicative | Subjunctive | Optative | Imperative | Imperfect (Ind.) |
|---|---|---|---|---|---|
| 1. sg. act. | λῡ́ω | λῡ́ω | λῡ́οιμι | — | ἔλῡον |
| 2. sg. act. | λῡ́εις | λῡ́ηις | λῡ́οις | λῡ́ε | ἔλῡες |
| 3. sg. act. | λῡ́ει | λῡ́ηι | λῡ́οι | λῡέτω | ἔλῡε(ν) |
| 1. pl. act. | λῡ́ομεν | λῡ́ωμεν | λῡ́οιμεν | — | ἐλῡ́ομεν |
| 2. pl. act. | λῡ́ετε | λῡ́ητε | λῡ́οιτε | λῡ́ετε | έλῡ́ετε |
| 3. pl. act. | λῡ́ουσι(ν) | λῡ́ωσι(ν) | λῡ́οιεν | λῡόντων | ἔλῡον |
| 2. du. act. | λῡ́ετον | λῡ́ητον | λῡ́οιτον | λῡ́ετον | ἐλῡ́ετον |
| 3. du. act. | λῡ́ετον | λῡ́ητον | λῡοίτην | λῡέτων | ἐλῡέτην |
| 1. sg. mp. | λῡ́ομαι | λῡ́ωμαι | λῡοίμην | — | ἐλῡόμην |
| 2. sg. mp. | λῡ́ηι (Note: Byform: λῡ́ει.) | λῡ́ηι | λῡ́οιο | λῡ́ου | ἐλῡ́ου |
| 3. sg. mp. | λῡ́εται | λῡ́ηται | λῡ́οιτο | λῡέσθω | ἐλῡ́ετο |
| 1. pl. mp. | λῡόμεθα | λῡώμεθα | λῡοίμεθα | — | ἐλῡόμεθα |
| 2. pl. mp. | λῡ́εσθε | λῡ́ησθε | λῡ́οισθε | λῡ́εσθε | έλῡ́εσθε |
| 3. pl. mp. | λῡ́ονται | λῡ́ωνται | λῡ́οιντο | λῡέσθων (Note: Postclassic byform: λῡέσθωσαν.) | ἐλῡόντο |
| 1. du. mp. | λῡόμεθον | λῡώμεθον | λῡοίμεθον | — | ἐλῡόμεθον |
| 2. du. mp. | λῡ́εσθον | λῡ́ησθον | λῡ́οισθον | λῡ́εσθον | ἐλῡ́εσθον |
| 3. du. mp. | λῡ́εσθον | λῡ́ησθον | λῡοίσθην | λῡέσθων | ἐλῡέσθην |

| Aorist | Indicative | Subjunctive | Optative | Imperative | Ind. Fut. | Opt. Fut. |
|---|---|---|---|---|---|---|
| 1. sg. act. | ἔλῡσα | λῡ́σω | λῡ́σαιμι | — | λῡ́σω | λῡ́σοιμι |
| 2. sg. act. | ἔλῡσας | λῡ́σηις | λῡ́σειας (Note: Byform: λῡ́σαις.) | λῡ́σον | λῡ́σεις | λῡ́σοις |
| 3. sg. act. | ἔλῡσε(ν) | λῡ́σηι | λῡ́σειε(ν) (Note: Byform: λῡ́σαι.) | λῡσάτω | λῡ́σει | λῡ́σοι |
| 1. pl. act. | ἐλῡ́σαμεν | λῡ́σωμεν | λῡ́σαιμεν | — | λῡ́σομεν | λῡ́σοιμεν |
| 2. pl. act. | ἐλῡ́σατε | λῡ́σητε | λῡ́σαιτε | λῡ́σατε | λῡ́σετε | λῡ́σοιτε |
| 3. pl. act. | ἔλῡσαν | λῡ́σωσι(ν) | λῡ́σειαν (Note: Byform: λῡ́σαιεν.) | λῡσάντων (Note: Postclassic byform: λῡσάτωσαν.) | λῡ́σουσι(ν) | λῡ́σοιεν |
| 2. du. act. | ἐλῡ́σατον | λῡ́σητον | λῡ́σαιτον | λῡ́σατον | λῡ́σετον | λῡ́σοιτον |
| 3. du. act. | ἐλῡσάτην | λῡ́σητον | λῡσαίτην | λῡσάτων | λῡ́σετον | λῡσοίτην |
| 1. sg. med. | ἐλῡσάμην | λῡ́σωμαι | λῡσαίμην | — | λῡ́σομαι | λῡσοίμην |
| 2. sg. med. | ἔλῡσω | λῡ́σηι | λῡ́σαιο | λῡ́σαι | λῡ́σηι | λῡ́σοιο |
| 3. sg. med. | λῡ́σατο | λῡ́σηται | λῡ́σαιτο | λῡσάσθω | λῡ́σεται | λῡ́σοιτο |
| 1. pl. med. | ἐλῡσάμεθα | λῡσώμεθα | λῡσαίμεθα | — | λῡσόμεθα | λῡσοίμεθα |
| 2. pl. med. | ἐλῡ́σασθε | λῡ́σησθε | λῡ́σαισθε | λῡ́σασθε | λῡ́σεσθε | λῡ́σοισθε |
| 3. pl. med. | ἐλῡ́σαντο | λῡ́σωνται | λῡ́σαιντο | λῡσάσθων (Note: Postclassic byform: λῡσάσθωσαν.) | λῡ́σονται | λῡ́σοιντο |
| 1. du. med. | ἐλῡσάμεθον | λῡσώμεθον | λῡσαίμεθον | — | λῡσόμεθον | λῡσοίμεθον |
| 2. du. med. | ἐλῡ́σαθον | λῡ́σησθον | λῡ́σαισθον | λῡ́σασθον | λῡ́σεσθον | λῡ́σοισθον |
| 3. du. med. | ἐλῡσάσθην | λῡ́σησθον | λῡσαίσθην | λῡσάσθων | λῡ́σεσθον | λῡσοίσθην |
| 1. sg. pass. | ελύθην | λυθῶ | λυθείην | — | λυθήσομαι | λυθησοίμην |
| 2. sg. pass. | ἐλύθης | λυθῆις | λυθείης | λύθητι | λυθήσηι | λυθήσοιο |
| 3. sg. pass. | ἐλύθη | λυθῆι | λυθείη | λυθήτω | λυθήσεται | λυθήσοιτο |
| 1. pl. pass. | ἐλύθημεν | λυθῶμεν | λυθεῖμεν (Note: Byform: λυθείημεν.) | — | λυθησόμεθα | λυθησοίμεθα |
| 2. pl. pass. | ἐλύθητε | λυθῆτε | λυθεῖτε (Note: Byform: λυθείητε.) | λύθητε | λυθήσεσθε | λυθήσοισθε |
| 3. pl. pass. | ἐλύθησαν | λυθῶσι(ν) | λυθεῖεν (Note: Byform: λυθείησαν.) | λυθέντων (Note: Postclassic byform: λυθήτωσαν.) | λυθήσονται | λυθήσοιντο |
| 1. du. pass. | — | — | — | — | λυθησόμεθον | λυθησοίμεθον |
| 2. du. pass. | ἐλύθητον | λυθῆτον | λυθεῖτον (Note: Byform: λυθείητον.) | λύθητον | λυθήσεσθον | λυθήσοισθον |
| 3. du. pass. | ἐλυθήτην | λυθῆτον | λυθείτην (Note: Byform: λυθειήτην.) | λυθήτων | λυθήσεσθον | λυθησοίσθην |

| Perfect | Indicative | Subjunctive | Optative | Imperative | Pluperfect (Ind.) | Ind. Fut. exact. | Opt. Fut. exact. |
|---|---|---|---|---|---|---|---|
| 1. sg. act. | λέλυκα | (λελύκω) (Note: The subjunctive forms of the mediopassive are consistently formed by the auxiliary verb εἰμί and the perfect passive participle, those of the active voice usually with εἰμί and the perfect active participle: λελυκὼς/-κυῖα/-κὸς/-κότα ὦ, ἦις, ἦ, λελυκότες/-κυίας ὦμεν, ἦτε, ὦσι(ν).) | (λελύκοιμι) (Note: The optative forms of the mediopassive are consistently formed by the auxiliary verb εἰμί and the perfect passive participle, those of the active voice usually with εἰμί and the perfect active participle: λελυκὼς/-κυῖα/-κὸς/-κότα εἴην, εἴἦς, εἴη, λελυκότες/-κυίας εἶμεν, εἶτε, εἶεν.) | — | ἐλελύκειν (Note: Older form: ἐλελύκη.) | — | — |
| 2. sg. act. | λέλυκας | (λελύκηις) | (λελύκοις) | (λέλυκε) | ἐλελύκεις (Note: Older form: ἐλελύκης.) | — | — |
| 3. sg. act. | λέλυκε(ν) | (λελύκηι) | (λελύκοι) | (λελυκέτω) | ἐλελύκει(ν) | — | — |
| 1. pl. act. | λελύκαμεν | (λελύκωμεν) | (λελύκοιμεν) | — | ἐλελύκεμεν (Note: Postclassic form: ἐλελύκειμεν.) | — | — |
| 2. pl. act. | λελύκατε | (λελύκητε) | (λελύκοιτε) | (λελύκετε) | ἐλελύκετε (Note: Postclassic form: ἐλελύκειτε.) | — | — |
| 3. pl. act. | λελύκασι(ν) | (λελύκωσι) | (λελύκοιεν) | (λελυκέτωσαν) | ἐλελύκεσαν (Note: Postclassic form: ἐλελύκεισαν.) | — | — |
| 2. du. act. | λελύκατον | (λελύκητον) | (λελύκοιτον) | (λελύκετον) | ἐλελύκετον | — | — |
| 3. du. act. | λελύκατον | (λελύκητον) | (λελυκοίτην) | (λελυκέτων) | ἐλελυκέτην | — | — |
| 1. sg. mp. | λέλυμαι | λελυμένος/-η/-ον/-α ὦ | λελυμένος/-η/-ον/-α εἴην | — | ἐλελύμην | λελύσομαι | λελυσοίμην |
| 2. sg. mp. | λέλυσαι | λελυμένος/-η/-ον/-α ἦις | λελυμένος/-η/-ον/-α εἴης | (λέλυσο) | ἐλέλυσο | λελύσηι | λελύσοιο |
| 3. sg. mp. | λέλυται | λελυμένος/-η/-ον/-α ἦι | λελυμένος/-η/-ον/-α εἴη | λελύσθω | ἐλέλυτο | λελύσεται | λελύσοιτο |
| 1. pl. mp. | λελύμεθα | λελυμένοι/-αι ὦμεν | λελυμένοι/-αι εἶμεν | — | ἐλελύμεθα | λελυσόμεθα | λελυσοίμεθα |
| 2. pl. mp. | λέλυσθε | λελυμένοι/-αι ἦτε | λελυμένοι/-αι εἶτε | (λέλυσθε) | έλέλυσθε | λελύσεσθε | λελύσοισθε |
| 3. pl. mp. | λέλυνται | λελυμένοι/-αι ὦσι(ν) | λελυμένοι/-αι εἶεν | (λελύσθωσαν) | ἐλέλυντο | λελύσονται | λελύσοιντο |
| 1. du. mp. | λελύμεθον | λελυμένω ὦμεν | λελυμένω εἶμεν | — | ἐλελύμεθον | λελυσόμεθον | λελυσοίμεθον |
| 2. du. mp. | λέλύσθον | λελυμένω ἦτον | λελυμένω εἶτον | (λέλυσθον) | ἐλέλυσθον | λελύσεσθον | λελύσοισθον |
| 3. du. mp. | λέλύσθον | λελυμένω ἦτον | λελυμένω εἶτον | (λελύσθων) | ἐλελύσθην | λελύσεσθον | λελυσοίσθην |

=== Contract verbs ===
In the present and imperfect tenses, the sounds represented by α and ο, in Attic Greek also ε, are usually merged with the following thematic vowel: τιμάω > τιμῶ 'I revere', καλέω > καλῶ 'I call'. In the Aeolic and Arcadocypriot dialects these verbs join the athematic class: κάλημμι ‘I call’.

| Pres. Ind. Act. | Early Ionic Greek (Note: Even in early Ionic the contracted forms are actually more common than the uncontracted ones.) | Attic Greek | Doric Greek | Lesbian Greek | Imperfect Act. |
|---|---|---|---|---|---|
| Infinitive | νῑκάειν | νῑκᾶν | νῑκῆν | νῑ́κᾱν | Attic |
| 1. sg. | νῑκάω | νῑκῶ | νῑκῶ | νῑ́καιμι | *ἐνῑ́καον > ἐνῑ́κων |
| 2. sg. | νῑκάεις | νῑκᾶις | νῑκῆις | νῑ́καις | *ἐνῑ́καες > ἐνῑ́κᾱς |
| 3. sg. | νῑκάει | νῑκᾶι | νῑκῆι | νῑ́και | *ἐνῑ́καε > ἐνῑ́κᾱ |
| 1. pl. | νῑκάομεν | νῑκῶμεν | νῑκᾶμες (Note: Byform: νῑκῶμες.) | νῑ́κᾱμεν | *ἐνῑκάομεν > ἐνῑκῶμεν |
| 2. pl. | νῑκάετε | νῑκᾶτε | νῑκῆτε | νῑ́κᾱτε | *ἐνῑκάετε > ἐνῑκᾶτε |
| 3. pl. | νῑκάουσι | νῑκῶσι(ν) | νῑκᾶντι (Note: Byform: νῑκῶντι.) | νῑ́καισι | *ἐνῑ́καον > ἐνῑ́κων |

| Pres. Ind. Act. | Early Ionic Greek (Note: Even in early Ionic the contracted forms are actually more common than the uncontracted ones.) | Attic Greek | Doric Greek | Lesbian Greek | Imperfect Act. |
|---|---|---|---|---|---|
| Infinitiv | φιλέειν | φιλεῖν | φιλῆν (Note: Byforms: φιλεῖν, φιλέν.) | φίλην | Attic |
| 1. sg. | φιλέω | φιλῶ | φιλίω (Note: Byforms: φιλῶ, φιλέω.) | φίλημι | *ἐφίλεον > ἐφίλουν |
| 2. sg. | φιλέεις | φιλεῖς | φιλῆς (Note: Byforms: φιλεῖς, φιλέης, φιλές.) | φίλης (Note: Byform: φιλησθα.) | *ἐφιλεες > ἐφίλεις |
| 3. sg. | φιλέει | φιλεῖ | φιλεῖ | φίλη | *ἐφίλεε > ἐφίλει |
| 1. pl. | φιλέομεν | φιλοῦμεν | φιλίομες (Note: Byforms: φιλίωμες, φιλῶμες, φιλοῦμες, φιλέομες.) | φίλημεν | *ἐφιλέομεν > ἐφιλοῦμεν |
| 2. pl. | φιλέετε | φιλεῖτε | φιλῆτε (Note: Byform: φιλεῖτε.) | φίλητε | *ἐφιλέετε > ἐφιλεῖτε |
| 3. pl. | φιλέουσι | φιλοῦσι(ν) | φιλίοντι (Note: Byforms: φιλόντι, φιλοῦντι, φιλεῦντι, φιλέοντι.) | φίλεισι | *ἐφίλεον > ἐφίλουν |

| Pres. Ind. Act. | Early Ionic Greek (Note: Even in early Ionic the contracted forms are actually more common than the uncontracted ones.) | Attic Greek | Doric Greek | Lesbian Greek | Imperfect Act. |
|---|---|---|---|---|---|
| Infinitiv | δηλόειν | δηλοῦν | δηλῶν | δήλων | Attic |
| 1. sg. | δηλόω | δηλῶ | δηλῶ | δήλωμι | *ἐδήλοον > ἐδήλουν |
| 2. sg. | δηλόεις | δηλοῖς | δηλωῖς | δήλως | *ἐδήλοες > ἐδήλους |
| 3. sg. | δηλόει | δηλοῖ | δηλωῖ | δήλω | *ἐδήλοε > ἐδήλου |
| 1. pl. | δηλόομεν | δηλοῦμεν | δηλῶμες (Note: Byform: δηλοῦμες.) | δήλωμεν | *ἐδηλόομεν > ἐδηλοῦμεν |
| 2. pl. | δηλόετε | δηλοῦτε | δηλῶτε (Note: Byform: δηλοῦτε.) | δήλωτε | *ἐδηλόετε > ἐδηλοῦτε |
| 3. pl. | δηλόουσι | δηλοῦσι(ν) | δηλῶντι (Note: Byform: δηλοῦντι, φιλέοντι.) | δήλοισι | *ἐδήλοον > ἐδήλουν |

=== Contract future tense forms ===
Some verbs in Attic Greek, among them all Verbs in -ίζω, have contracted future tense forms, that look the same as the present forms of verbs in -εω:

| Ind. Fut. | ἀγγέλλειν 'to report' | ἐλᾶν 'to drive, chase' | βιάζειν 'to force, coerce' | καλεῖν 'to call' | κτερίζειν 'to bury' |
|---|---|---|---|---|---|
| 1. sg. act. | ἀγγελῶ | ἐλῶ | βιῶ | καλῶ | κτεριῶ |
| 2. sg. act. | ἀγγελεῖς | ἐλᾶις | βιᾶις | καλεῖς | κτεριεῖς |
| 3. sg. act. | ἀγγελεῖ | ἐλᾶι | βιᾶι | καλεῖ | κτεριεῖ |
| 1. pl. act. | ἀγγελοῦμεν | ἐλῶμεν | βιῶμεν | καλοῦμεν | κτεριοῦμεν |
| 2. pl. act. | ἀγγελεῖτε | ἐλᾶτε | βιᾶτε | καλεῖτε | κτεριεῖτε |
| 3. pl. act. | ἀγγελοῦσι(ν) | ἐλῶσι(ν) | βιῶσι(ν) | καλοῦσι(ν) | κτεριοῦσι(ν) |
| 2. du. act. | ἀγγελεῖτον | ἐλᾶτον | βιᾶτον | καλεῖτον | κτεριεῖτον |
| 3. du. act. | ἀγγελεῖτον | ἐλᾶτον | βιᾶτον | καλεῖτον | κτεριεῖτον |
| 1. sg. med. | ἀγγελοῦμαι | ἐλῶμαι | βιῶμαι | καλοῦμαι | κτεριοῦμαι |
| 2. sg. med. | ἀγγελῆι (Note: Byform: ἀγγελεῖ.) | ἐλᾶι | βιᾶι | καλῆι (Note: Byform: καλεῖ.) | κτεριῆι (Note: Byform: κτεριεῖ.) |
| 3. sg. med. | ἀγγελεῖται | ἐλᾶται | βιᾶται | καλεῖται | κτεριεῖται |
| 1. pl. med. | ἀγγελοῦμεθα | ἐλώμεθα | βιώμεθα | καλοῦμεθα | κτεριοῦμεθα |
| 2. pl. med. | ἀγγελεῖσθε | ἐλᾶσθε | βιᾶσθε | καλεῖσθε | κτεριεῖσθε |
| 3. pl. med. | ἀγγελοῦνται | ἐλῶνται | βιῶνται | καλοῦνται | κτεριοῦνται |
| 1. du. med. | ἀγγελοῦμεθον | ἐλώμεθον | βιώμεθον | καλοῦμεθον | κτεριοῦμεθον |
| 2. du. med. | ἀγγελεῖσθον | ἐλᾶσθον | βιᾶσθον | καλεῖσθον | κτεριεῖσθον |
| 3. du. med. | ἀγγελεῖσθον | ἐλᾶσθον | βιᾶσθον | καλεῖσθον | κτεριεῖσθον |

== Literature ==
- Carl Darling Buck, Comparative Grammar of Greek and Latin, Chicago/London 1933, p. 262 ff.
- Carl Darling Buck, The Greek Dialects, Chicago 1955, p. 122 ff.
- Jean Louis Burnouf, Méthode pour étudier la langue grecque, Paris 1835, p. 62 ff.
- Raphael Kühner/Friedrich Blass, Ausführliche Grammatik der griechischen Sprache. Erster Teil: Elementar- und Formenlehre II, 3rd revised edition, Hannover 1892, pp. 98 ff., 122 ff., 198 ff.
