= Aeolic Greek =

Set of Ancient Greek dialects

- Lesbian
- Αἰολική
- Region: Aeolis, Lesbos, Thessaly, Boeotia and possibly Lower Macedonia
- Era: c. 800–300 BC
- Language family: Indo-European: Hellenic; Greek; Aeolic Greek
- Early form: Proto-Greek
- Dialects: Boeotian; Thessalian; Lesbian; (?) Ancient Macedonian
- Writing system: Greek alphabet (uncial and cursive forms); Eastern Archaic Greek alphabet (up to 4th century BC)

Language codes
- ISO 639-3: –
- Glottolog: aeol1234
- Distribution of Greek dialects in Greece in the classical period. Western group: Doric proper; Northwest Doric; Achaean Doric (probably Northwest Doric); Central group: Aeolic; Arcado-Cypriot; Eastern group: Attic; Ionic

Aeolian (/iːˈɒliən/) or Aeolic Greek (/iːˈɒlɪk/), also known as Lesbic or Lesbian dialect, is the set of dialects of Ancient Greek in Greek linguistics, that was spoken mainly in Boeotia; in Thessaly; in the Aegean island of Lesbos; in the Greek colonies of Aeolis in Anatolia and adjoining islands; and possibly in Lower Macedonia.

The Aeolic dialect shows many archaisms in comparison to the other Ancient Greek dialects (Arcadocypriot, Attic, Ionic, and Doric), as well as many innovations; it is, consequently, considered to be—for the modern reader—perhaps the most difficult of the dialects.

Aeolic Greek is widely known as the language of Sappho and of Alcaeus of Mytilene. Aeolic poetry, which is exemplified in the works of Sappho, mostly uses four classical meters known as the Aeolics: Glyconic (the most basic form of Aeolic line), hendecasyllabic verse, Sapphic stanza, and Alcaic stanza (the latter two are respectively named for Sappho and Alcaeus).

Additionally, based on the conclusions drawn by several studies and findings such as Pella curse tablet, Emilio Crespo and other scholars suggest that the Ancient Macedonian dialect was a Northwest Doric dialect, that shared isoglosses with its neighboring Aeolic dialects spoken in northeastern Thessaly. Other scholars have suggested an Aeolic Greek classification with strong Northwest Greek influence for the ancient Macedonian dialect. Hellanicus of Lesbos considered Makedon to be a son of Aeolus (son of Hellen).

== Phonology ==
=== Consonants ===
==== Labiovelars ====
Proto-Indo-European and Proto-Greek *kʷ changed to Aeolic p everywhere. By contrast, PIE *kʷ changed to Attic/Ionic, Arcadocypriot, and Doric t before e and i.

- PIE *kʷetwores → Lesbian písures, Boeotian péttares ~ Attic téttares, Ionic tésseres, Doric tétores "four"

Similarly PIE/PGk *gʷ always became b and PIE *gʷʰ > PGk *kʰʷ always became ph (whereas in other dialects they became alternating b/d and ph/th before back/front vowels).

Labiovelars were treated the same way in the P-Celtic languages and the Sabellic languages.

==== Sonorant clusters ====
A Proto-Greek consonant cluster with h (from Indo-European *s) and a sonorant (r, l, n, m, w, y) changed to the double sonorant (rr, ll, nn, mm, ww, yy) in Lesbian and Thessalian (sub-dialects of Aeolic) by assimilation. In Attic/Ionic, Doric, and Boeotian Aeolic, the h assimilated to the vowel before the consonant cluster, causing the vowel to lengthen by compensatory lengthening.

PIE VsR or VRs → Attic/Ionic-Doric-Boeotian VVR.
PIE VsR or VRs → Lesbian-Thessalian VRR.

- PIE *h₁ésmi → Proto-Greek *ehmi → Lesbian-Thessalian emmi ~ Attic/Ionic ēmi (= εἰμί) "I am"

==== Loss of h ====
Lesbian Aeolic lost initial h- (psilosis "stripping") from Proto-Indo-European *s- or *y-. By contrast, Ionic sometimes retains it, and Attic always retains it.

- PIE *sh₂wél(i)yos → Proto-Greek *hāwélios → Lesbian āélios, Ionic ēélios ~ Attic hēlios "sun"

==== Retention of w ====
In Thessalian and Boeotian (sub-dialects of Aeolic) and Doric, the Proto-Indo-European and Proto-Greek semi-vowel w (digamma) was retained at the beginning of a word.

- PIE *wekʷ-es- → Boeotian, Doric wépos ~ Attic-Ionic épos "word", "epic" (compare Latin vōx "voice")

=== Vowels ===
==== Long a ====
In Aeolic and Doric, Proto-Greek long ā remains. By contrast, in Attic, long ā changes to long ē in most cases; in Ionic, it changes everywhere.

- PIE *meh₂ter- → Aeolic, Doric mātēr ~ Attic/Ionic mētēr "mother"

==== Compensatory lengthening ====
Compensatory lengthening of a, e, o in Lesbian gives ai, ei, oi (in Attic, it would be ā, ei, ou) for example in the accusative plural of a and o stem nouns, or in many 3 Pl verb conjugations.

==== Boeotian ====
In Boeotian, the vowel-system was, in many cases, changed in a way reminiscent of the modern Greek pronunciation.

- Attic/Ionic αι /ai/ ~ Boeotian η /eː/ ~ Modern Greek αι /e/
- Attic/Ionic ει /eː/ ~ Boeotian ει /iː/ ~ Modern Greek ει /i/
- Attic/Ionic οι /oi/ ~ Boeotian υ /yː/ ~ Mediaeval Greek and Old Athenaean οι /y/ ~ Modern Greek οι /i/

=== Accent ===
In Lesbian Aeolic, the accent of all words is recessive (barytonesis), as is typical only in the verbs of other dialects.

- Attic/Ionic potamós ~ Lesbian pótamos "river"

== Morphology ==
Contracted or vowel-stem verbs that are thematic in Attic/Ionic are often athematic (-mi) in Aeolic.

- Ionic philéō, Attic philô ~ Aeolic phílēmi "I love"

Aeolic athematic infinitive active ends in -men or (Lesbian) -menai. ~ Attic/Ionic has -enai.

- Lesbian émmen, émmenai; Thessalian, Boeotian eîmen ~ Attic/Ionic eînai (spurious diphthong) "to be"

In the Lesbian dialect this ending also extends to the thematic conjugation, where Attic/Ionic has -ein. All three of these Aeolic endings occur in Homer.

- Homeric agémen

Proto-Greek -ans and -ons → -ais and -ois (first- and second declension accusative plural) ~ Attic/Ionic -ās and -ōs (-ους).

Dative plural -aisi and -oisi ~ Attic/Ionic -ais and -ois.

The participle has -ois and -ais for Attic -ōs (-ους), -ās.

== Glossary ==
Below is a list of several words in the Aeolian dialect, written in the Greek alphabet, along with a transcription in the Latin alphabet. Each word is followed by its meaning and compared to similar words in other ancient Greek dialects. The "notes" section provides additional information, and if applicable, an etymology is given.

=== Aeolian ===
Aeolian lemma	Transcription	Meaning	Correspondence to other Greek dialects	Notes
ἀέλιος	āélios	'sun'	Doric āélios; Attic hēlios; Cretan abelios; Laconian bela; Pamphylian babelios	Derives from PIE *seh₂u-el- 'sun'.
βάλλα	balla	'threshold'	* Attic βῆλος bēlos * Doric balos	
βᾶμα	bama		Doric βᾶμα bama; Attic βῆμα bema 'walking, step'	Per Beekes, both forms derive from root βῆ-, itself from PIE *gʷeh₂-. Corresponds to Avestan gā-man- 'step, pace'.
βελφιν Βέλφοι	belphin Belphoi	'dolphin, Delphi'	Attic delphis	Per Beekes, βέλφινες occurs in Lesbian, while Βελφοί is Aeolic.
βραδινός	bradinos	'slender, soft'	Attic rhadinos	Attested in Sapph. 90,104.
βράκος	brakos	'expensive garment'	Homeric ῥάκος rhakos 'rag, shred, wrinkles, remnants'; ϝράκος wrakos	Attested in Sapph. 70. Per Beekes, of uncertain etymology.
βρίζα	briza	'root'	Attic rhiza	
βρόδον	brodon	'rose'	Attic ῥόδον rhodon 'rose'	Possible Eastern borrowing (cf. Arm vard 'rose' < Old Iranian *u̯ṛda 'id'). Also means vagina metaphorically in Erotic Glossary
δνόφος	dnophos	'darkness'	Also appears in Ionic; Attic ζόφος zophos	Per Beekes, the word "recalls" zóphos, knéphas and pséphas.
Ἐννησιάδες	Ennesiades	'Lesbian Nymphs'		
ἐπιάλτης ήπιάλης	epialtēs epialēs	'nightmare'	Attic ephialtēs	Epialtēs attested in Alcaeus. Cf. Ephialtes, one of the Aloadae.
ἴρον	iron	'holy'	Attic/Arcado-Cypriot/Tessalian ἱερόν hierón, ἱερός hierós; Doric hiarón; West Greek ἱαρός hiarós or ἰαρός iarós; Ionic hirón, East Ionic ἰερός ierós and ἰρός irós; Pamphylian hιιαρύ hiiarú	Derives from PIE *ish₁ro- 'holy'. Per Woodard, Lesbian ἶρος îros
κλᾷδες	klaides		Doric klaides; Attic kleides 'bars, bolts, keys'	Derives from PIE *kleh₂u- 'lock', although Beekes suggests the original meaning must have been 'nail, pin, hook', as in, instruments to lock a door.
μέσσυϊ μέσσος	messui messos		Attic ἐν μέσῳ 'in the middle'; Cretan/Boeotian μέττος	Identical to Sanskrit mádhya-, Latin medius, Gothic midjis, all from PIE *médʰ-io- 'in the middle'.
πέμπε	pempe	'five'	Attic πέντε pente; Pamphylian πέ(ν)δε pede	From PIE *pénkʷe 'five'.
πέσδος	pésdos	'pedestrian', 'infantry' (as a collective)	Attic πεζός pezós	Per Beekes, formally identical to Sanskrit pád-ya 'regarding the foot' < PIE *ped-i̯o-.
πέσσον	pesson	'plain'	Attic πεδίον pedion 'surface, plain, field'; Cypriot πεδίjα 'plain'	From PIE *ped- 'foot'.
πέσσυρες	pessyres	'four'	Lesbian πίσυρες pisyres; Boeotian πέτταρες pettares; Attic τέσσαρες tessares; Doric tetores	Derives from PIE *kʷetuer- 'four'.
ξέννος	xennos	'foreigner, guest-friend, strange'	Attic xenos; Ionic xeinos	Beekes supposes it could be pre-Greek.
στρότος	strótos	'army, troop'	Attic στρατός stratós	Per Beekes, exact correspondence to Sanskrit str̩ta- 'thrown down', Avestan stərəta- 'spread out'.
ὔσδος	usdos	'branch, twig, bough, offshoot'	Attic ozos 'twig, branch'	Derives from PIE *h₃esdo- > *Hosdo-.
φηρία	phēria	'wild animal'	Attic θηρία thēria 'beasts'	Derives from PIE *ǵʰueh₁r-.
Ψάπφω	Psapphō		Attic Σαπφώ Sapphō	

- ἄγωνος ágōnos 'struggle' (Attic ἀγῶν agōn; Elean dat. pl. agōnois for agōsi)
- ἀθρήματα athrḗmata 'gifts sent by kin to Lesbian brides' (Sappho fr.) (cf. Homeric hedna, eedna)
- Αἰολίωνες Aiolíōnes "Aeolians" (Attic Αἰολεῖς Aioleîs) (aiolizō "speak Aeolic, compose in the Aeolian mode, trick out with false words" Sophocles Fr. 912) (aioleō vary, adorn, diversify (aiolos quick-moving, glittering, shifty)
- ἀκλάδες aklades (Attic akladeutoi ampeloi 'unpruned vineyards')
- ἀκόντιον akontion 'part of troops' (Attic 'spear') (Macedonian rhachis 'spine or backbone, anything ridged like the backbone')
- ἀμένης -τος amenēs -tos (Attic ὑμήν humēn 'thin skin, membrane')
- ἀμώνες amōnes (Attic ἀνεμώνες anemones)
- ἄορος aoros (Attic ἄϋπνος aypnos 'without sleep') Μηθυμναῖοι
- ἄρπυς arpys (Attic ἔρως 'Eros, Love') attested in Crinagoras, ἁρπάζειν harpazein 'to snatch'. Homeric harpaleos 'attractive, devouring'
- ἄσφε asphe 'to them' (Attic sphe 'sphi')
- βακχόα bakchoa (Attic βόθρος bothros 'sacred dungeon, pit')
- βλῆρ blēr 'incitement' (Attic delear) τὸ δὲ αὐτὸ καὶ αἶθμα. παρὰ Ἀλκαίῳ ἡ λέξις
- βραδανίζω bradanizō 'brandish, shake off' cf. Elean bratana 'common rhatany'
- βρᾴδιον braidion (Attic ῥᾴδιον rhaidion 'easy')
- βράκειν brakein 'to understand' (dysbrakanon 'imprehensible')
- βροδόπαχυς brodopachus 'with pink, rosy forearms' (Attic rhodopechys) (βροδόπαχυν brodopachun Sappho) and brododaktulos 'with rosy fingers'
- βροχέως brocheos or βρουκέων broukeon (Attic βραχύ brachy short) (Sapph. fr. 2, 7)
- δράσειν drasein (Attic θύειν thyein 'to sacrifice')
- εἴδη eide (Attic ὕλη 'forest') (also Ionian εἴδη)
- ζάδηλον zadelon 'with holes in it, open' (Attic diadelon 'obvious') (Alcaeus 30 D 148P)
- ἴμβηρις imbēris eel (Attic ἔγχελυς enchelys) Μηθυμναῖοι
- Ἰσσα Issa old name of Lesbos Island Cf. Antissa
- ἴσσασθαι issasthai (Attic κληροῦσθαι klerousthai to take sth by lot)
- καγκύλη kankulē (Attic κηκῖς kēkis wet, vapour, mordant dyeing)
- κάμμαρψις kammarpsis 'dry measure' (Attic ἡμιμέδιμνον hemimedimnon 'one half of a medimnos')
- καραβίδες karabides (Attic γρᾶες graes) Μηθυμναῖοι
- καυαλέον kaualeon Hsch (Attic αἶθος aithos 'fire, burning heat') cf. kaiō 'burn'
- Mεσοστροφώνια Mesostrophonia Lesbian festival
- μόλσος molsos (Attic δημός 'fat')
- ξίμβρα ximbra (Attic ῥοιά rhoia 'pomegranate-tree') (Boeotian sida)
- ὄθματα othmata (Attic ommata 'eyes')
- ὄν ón ὄνα óna (Attic ἀνά aná) 'upon, through, again' (also Arcadocypriot)
- πασσύριον passyrion (Attic passydia 'totally, all together, with the whole army')
- πεδαμείβω pedameivō (Attic metameivo 'exchange') (πεδέχω pedecho μετέχω metecho), pedoikos metoikos peda for meta
- Πέῤῥαμος Perrhamos Priamus (Alcaeus 74D, 111P; it also means 'king')
- σάωμι saōmi 'save' (Attic σῴζω sōizō) (Homeric σαόω saoō)
- σίγλαι siglai 'ear-rings' (Attic enōtia, Laconian exōbadia)
- σκίφος skiphos Attic xiphos 'sword' (skiptō, given as etym. of skiphos and xiphos, Sch.Il.1.220; cf. skipei: nussei 'it pricks, pierces')
- σπόλα spóla(Attic στολή stolē) 'equipment, garment' (spaleis, 'the sent one', for staleis)
- σύρξ syrx (Attic σάρξ sarx 'flesh') (dative plural σύρκεσιν syrkesi, Attic σαρξίν sarxin)
- τενεκοῦντι tenekounti (Attic enoikounti, dative singular of ἐνοικῶν enoikōn 'inhabiting')
- τράγαις tragais you break, grow rough and hoarse and smell like a goat
- τῦδε tude (tudai and tuide here; Ionic tēde)
- φαυόφορος phauophoros 'priestess' (Attic ἱέρεια hiereia 'light-keeper') (Aeolic phauō for Homeric phaō 'shine') (Homeric phaos 'light', Attic phōs and phōtophoros)

==== Boeotian ====
Boeotian lemma	Transcription	Meaning	Correspondence to other Greek dialects	Notes
ἄας ἀεστητόν	aas aestēton	'tomorrow'	Attic αὔριον aurion	Cf. Attic ēōs 'dawn'.
βανά βανῆκες	bana banēkes	'woman' 'women' (pl.)	Attic gunē, gunaikes	Derived from PIE *gʷḗn-h₂.
Δεύς	Deus	'Zeus'	Also attested in: Laconian Δεύς Deús; Rhodian Δεύς Deús	Derived from PIE *Dyeus ('sky-god').
γάδου ϝάδου	gadou wadou	'sweet, pleasant'	Attic ἡδύ hēdú 'sweet, tasteful, pleasant, pleasing'	Attested in Corinna. 17. Derived from PIE *sueh₂d-ú- 'sweet'.
κᾶρουξ	karoux		Attic κήρυξ kēryx 'herald, messenger'; Doric κᾶρυξ káryx	Per Beekes, probably pre-Greek.

- ἀμίλλακας amillakas 'wine' Theban (Attic oinos)
- ἀνωδόρκας anōdorkas 'a fish' βρίγκος ὁ ἰχθῦς, ὑπὸ Θηβαίων
- βαιδύμην baidumēn (Attic ἀροτριᾶν arotrian to plough)
- βανά bana (βαλάρα balara) 'woman' (Attic gunē); βανῆκες banēkes, βάττικες battikes 'women' (Attic gunaikes)
- βάστραξ bastrax or bastax (Attic τράχηλος trachēlos 'neck') pl. bastraches
- βλεερεῖ bleerei (Attic οἰκτείρει 'he feels pity') cf. eleairei
- ἐμπυρία empyria 'divination' (Attic manteia) (Hsch. public oath, Koine ordeal by fire)
- ζεκελτίδες zekeltides 'gourds' Amerias zakeltides (Phrygian zelkia vegetables)
- ἴδηφιν idephin 'sweet-voiced' Hsch.: ἴδηφιν ἴδαις· Βοιωτοί. [καὶ ὁ ἡδυλάλος διὰ τῆς διφθόγγου] (Attic hēduphōnon) (Aeolic wad-, ad-)
- ἰστάκη istake scythe (Attic δρέπανον drepanon)
- ἰυγοδρομεῖν iugodromein (Attic ἐκβοηθεῖν, ekboēthein, and boēdromein, 'run to help') (Ἰύγγυϊ Dionysus, ἰυγή voice, scream (Soph. Phil. 752)) (Thessalian Iungios 'month')
- ἰώ iō and hiōn (Attic ἐγώ egō, I) (hiōnga iōga for egōge)
- Καραιός Karaios Boeotian epithet for Zeus meaning 'tall, head'; Boeotian eponym Karaidas
- κριδδέμεν kriddemen (Attic γελᾶν gelan 'to laugh') (Strattis fr. 47) Cf. (cf. Attic krizō 'creak, screech')
- κόριλλα korilla 'little girl' (Koine korasion from Attic korasis 'girl') (Aetolian korudion)
- μηλάτας mēlatas (Attic ποιμήν poimen 'shepherd') (homeric μῆλον mēlon 'sheep') (Attic mēlon 'apple', Aeolic-Doric malon)
- μνάριον mnarion (Attic κάλλυντρον kallyntron 'broom, brush')
- ὀπισθοτίλα opisthotila (Attic σηπία sēpia 'cuttlefish') (Strattis. fr. 47,3) ('squirts its liquor from behind')
- ὀπίττομαι opittomai (Homeric opizomai 'I care, respect') (Laconian opiddomai)
- ὀφρυγνᾷ ophrygnai (Attic ὀφρυάζει ophryazei 'he winks raising the eyebrow, is haughty')
- σεῖα seia 'I persecuted' (Attic ἐδίωξα edioxa) (cf. Homeric seuō 'move quickly, chase')
- συοβοιωτοί syoboiōtoi Hog-Boeotians (Cratinus. 310)
- τρίπεζα tripeza (Attic trapeza 'table') (from tetrapeza 'four-footed'; tripeza 'three-footed', in Aeolic it would be tripesda)
- ψώσματα psōsmata Boeotian word

==== Thessalian ====
Thessalian lemma	Transcription	Meaning	Correspondence to other Greek dialects	Notes
Ἄπλουν	Aploun	'Apollo' (Olympic deity; brother to Artemis)	Attic Ἀπόλλων Apollōn; Doric/Pamphylian Ἀπέλο̄ν Apelon	
δάμοσσος	dámossos	'public'	Attic dēmósios	See iddioûstikos below.
δέσποινα	despoina	'woman'		Feminine form of despotes. In Attic gunē, in Doric guna, meaning 'woman'. See also Despoina.
ἰδδιούστικος	iddioûstikos	'privative'	Attic idiōtikós	
κίς	kis	'who, anyone'	Attic tis; Laconian tir; Arcadocypriot sis	Derived from PIE *kʷi- (interrogative/relative pronoun).
κῦῤῥος	kyrrhos or kyrros	'sir, master'	Attic kyrios	
Μακετοὺν	Maketoun	'Macedonian man'	Attic Μακεδών Makedōn 'id'	Thessalian suffix -ουν (-oun) parallels Attic suffix ων ōn in both nominative and genitive of participles, pronouns and nouns.
ματτύη	mattuē	a meat-dessert of Macedonian or Thessalian origin (in Athenaeus)		Cf. Macedonian mattuēs 'a kind of bird'.
Πέτθαλος; Πεθθάλειος	Pétthalos	'Thessalian man'	Boeotian Φέτταλος Phéttalos; Attic Θετταλός Thettalós; Ionic/Koine Θεσσαλός Thessalós 'id'	Per Beekes, a Pre-Greek word derived from *Kʷettʸal-.

- ἀβρεμής abremēs (Attic ἀβλεπής ablepēs ἀνάξιος του βλέπεσθαι 'unworthy seeing, despicable'; Cypriotic also) (Hes. text ἀβλεπής Κύπριοι καὶ Θετταλοί)
- ἀγορά agora (Attic λιμήν limen 'port, harbour') (Hes. text Θετταλοὶ δὲ καὶ τὸν λιμένα ἀγορὰν καλοῦσιν Κρῆτες δὲ τὴν ἐκκλησίαν)
- ἀλφινία alphinia 'white poplar' (PIE *albho- 'white') (Attic leukē, PIE *leuk- 'bright, light'; Macedonian aliza)
- ἀσπάλεια aspaleia safeness (Attic asphaleia)
- ἀστραλός astralos (Attic ψάρ -ος psar 'starling')
- βεβυκῶσθαι bebukousthai 'to be swollen' (Homeric βυκτάων buktaon 'blowing')
- βουσία bousia (Attic γογγυλίδι gongylidi 'turnip')
- δάρατος daratos 'Thessalian bread' (Macedonian dramis, Athamanian dramix, PIE *der- 'cut, split')
- ἔνορμος enormos (agora, assembly, market and chōra) (Attic enormeō 'get in a harbour, hormos bay, anchorage')
- ἐρέας ereas children (Hsch. Attic τέκνα tekna) (Homeric ernos 'young sprout, scion'; Neo-Phrygian eiroi 'children')
- θεανῶσται theanoustai (Attic ξυστῆρες xysterss)
- ἰθείη itheiē (Attic ἁμαξιτός hamaxitos 'chariot-road') (Homeric ἰθεῖα ὀρθή Ψ 580) (Attic ithys, eytheia 'straight line')
- ἴμψας impsas past participle of impto (Attic ζεύξας zeuxas, zeugnymi 'join') (Ἴμψιος Impsios Ποσειδῶν ὁ ζύγιος Poseidon Zygius on horses)
- κάλαφος kalaphos (Attic ἀσκάλαφος Ascalaphus, a bird (Magnesian))
- καπάνη kapanē 'chariot' (Attic ἀπήνη apēnē), also a 'helmet'; kapanikos 'plenteous'
- καρπαία karpaia Thessalo-Macedonian mimic military dance (see also Carpaea) (Homeric karpalimos 'swift (for foot) eager, ravenous')
- νεαλεῖς nealeis 'new-comers, newly caught ones'; cf. nealeis, neēludes)
- νεβεύω nebeuō 'pray' (Macedonian neuō) (Attic euchomai, neuō 'wink')
- ὀνάλα onala, ὀνάλουμα onalouma (Attic analōma 'expense, cost') (on- in the place of Attic prefix ana-, ongrapsantas SEG 27:202)
- Πετθαλια Petthalia 'Thessalia'; Petthaloi 'Thessalians'; Koine thessalisti 'the Thessalian way'; cf. Attic ἐντεθετταλίζομαι entethettalizomai become a Thessalian, i.e. wear the large Thessalian cloak (Thettalika ptera feathers), Eupolis. 201)
- ταγεύω tageuō 'to be tagos archon' in Thessaly ταγευόντουν τοῦμ Πετθαλοῦν

== See also ==
- Aeolus
- Hesychius of Alexandria

== General references ==
=== General studies ===
- Adrados, Francisco Rodríguez (2005). "The Specific Literary Languages: Lesbian, Boeotian and Syracusan". A History of the Greek Language. Leiden, The Netherlands: Brill. pp. 118–125. doi:10.1163/9789047415596_009. ISBN 978-90-474-1559-6.
- Bakker, Egbert J., ed. 2010. A companion to the Ancient Greek language. Oxford: Wiley-Blackwell.
- Beek, Lucien van (2022). "Greek". In Thomas Olander (ed.). The Indo-European Language Family. Cambridge: Cambridge University Press. pp. 173–201. doi:10.1017/9781108758666.011. ISBN 978-1-108-75866-6.
- Beekes, Robert S. P. (2009). Etymological Dictionary of Greek. Brill Academic Publishers. ISBN 978-90-04-17418-4.
- Colvin, Stephen C. 2007. A historical Greek reader: Mycenaean to the koiné. Oxford: Oxford University Press.
- Dosuna, J. Mendes (2007). "The Aeolic dialects". In Christidis, Anastasios-Phoivos (ed.). A history of Ancient Greek: From the beginnings to Late Antiquity. Cambridge, UK: Cambridge University Press. pp. 460–474. ISBN 9780521833073.
- Miller, D. Gary (2014). "4. Greece, Greek, and Its Dialects". Ancient Greek Dialects and Early Authors: Introduction to the Dialect Mixture in Homer, with Notes on Lyric and Herodotus. Berlin, Boston: De Gruyter. pp. 25–33. doi:10.1515/9781614512950.25. ISBN 978-1-61451-493-0.
- Horrocks, Geoffrey. 2010. Greek: A history of the language and its speakers. 2nd ed. Oxford: Wiley-Blackwell.
- Scarborough, Matthew (2023). "The Problem of Aeolic in Ancient Greek Dialectology". The Aeolic Dialects of Ancient Greek. Leiden, The Netherlands: Brill. pp. 1–39. doi:10.1163/9789004543713_002. ISBN 978-90-04-54371-3.
- Scarborough, Matthew (2023a). "The Core Aeolic Isoglosses". The Aeolic Dialects of Ancient Greek. Leiden, The Netherlands: Brill. pp. 60–129. doi:10.1163/9789004543713_004. ISBN 978-90-04-54371-3.
- Scarborough, Matthew (2023b). "The Peripheral Aeolic Isoglosses". The Aeolic Dialects of Ancient Greek. Leiden, The Netherlands: Brill. pp. 130–211. doi:10.1163/9789004543713_005. ISBN 978-90-04-54371-3.
- Palmer, Leonard R. 1980. The Greek language. London: Faber & Faber.
- Woodard, Roger D. (2024). "The Aeolic Dialects". Aeolic and Aeolians: Origins of an Ancient Greek Language and Its Community of Speakers. Cambridge University Press. pp. 20–49. doi:10.1017/9781009424370.004.

=== On the Boeotian dialect ===
- Blanc, Alain (2024). "Les anthroponymes béotiens en ‑ει et le nom du Thébain Tellê dans les inscriptions de Delphes". In Alcorac Alonso Déniz; Julián V. Méndez Dosuna; Enrique Nieto Izquierdo; Gilles van Heems (eds.). Contacts linguistiques en Grèce ancienne (in French). Lyon: MOM Éditions. pp. 255–272. doi:10.4000/12154.
- Buck, R. J. (1968). "The Aeolic Dialect in Boeotia". Classical Philology. 63 (4): 268–280. doi:10.1086/365411.
- Miller, D. Gary (2014). "19. Boeotian and Thessalian". Ancient Greek Dialects and Early Authors: Introduction to the Dialect Mixture in Homer, with Notes on Lyric and Herodotus. Berlin, Boston: De Gruyter. pp. 219–233. doi:10.1515/9781614512950.219. ISBN 978-1-61451-493-0.
- Pantelidis, Nikolaos. "Boeotian and its Neighbors: A Central Helladic Dialect Continuum?" In: Studies in Ancient Greek Dialects: From Central Greece to the Black Sea. Edited by Georgios Giannakis, Emilio Crespo and Panagiotis Filos. Berlin, Boston: De Gruyter, 2018. pp. 167–188. doi:10.1515/9783110532135-010
- Page, Denis L. 1953. Corinna. London: Society for the Promotion of Hellenic Studies.
- Vottéro, Guy (2026). "The Boeotian Dialect (Late 8th or Early 7th to 2nd Century BCE): Ecology of a System". In Andreas Willi; Philomen Probert (eds.). Perceptions and Social Uses of the Ancient Greek Dialects. De Gruyter. pp. 179–207. doi:10.1515/9783111679112-008.
- West, Martin L. 1990. "Dating Corinna." Classical Quarterly 40 (2): 553–557.

=== On the Lesbian dialect ===
- Bowie, Angus M. 1981. The poetic dialect of Sappho and Alcaeus. New York: Arno.
- Finkelberg, Margalit. "Lesbian and Mainland Greece". In: Studies in Ancient Greek Dialects: From Central Greece to the Black Sea. Edited by Georgios Giannakis, Emilio Crespo and Panagiotis Filos. Berlin, Boston: De Gruyter, 2018. pp. 447–456. doi:10.1515/9783110532135-023
- Hodot, René (2018). "Lesbian, in Space, Time, and its Uses". In Georgios Giannakis; Emilio Crespo; Panagiotis Filos (eds.). Studies in Ancient Greek Dialects: From Central Greece to the Black Sea. Berlin, Boston: De Gruyter. pp. 457–470. doi:10.1515/9783110532135-024.
- Miller, D. Gary (2014). "20. Lesbian". Ancient Greek Dialects and Early Authors: Introduction to the Dialect Mixture in Homer, with Notes on Lyric and Herodotus. Berlin, Boston: De Gruyter. pp. 234–254. doi:10.1515/9781614512950.234. ISBN 978-1-61451-493-0.
- Tribulato, Olga (2021). "Sappho's Dialect". In P. J. Finglass; Adrian Kelly (eds.). The Cambridge Companion to Sappho. Cambridge Companions to Literature. Cambridge: Cambridge University Press. pp. 135–46. doi:10.1017/9781316986974.011. ISBN 978-1-316-98697-4.

=== On the Thessalian dialect ===
- Chadwick, John (1992). "The Thessalian Accent". Glotta. 70 (1/2): 2–14. JSTOR 40266905. Accessed 23 Mar. 2024.
- Helly, Bruno. "Some Materials for a Historical Grammar of the Thessalian Dialect". In: Studies in Ancient Greek Dialects: From Central Greece to the Black Sea. Edited by Georgios Giannakis, Emilio Crespo and Panagiotis Filos. Berlin, Boston: De Gruyter, 2018. pp. 351–374. doi:10.1515/9783110532135-018
- Miller, D. Gary (2014). "19. Boeotian and Thessalian". Ancient Greek Dialects and Early Authors: Introduction to the Dialect Mixture in Homer, with Notes on Lyric and Herodotus. Berlin, Boston: De Gruyter. pp. 219–233. doi:10.1515/9781614512950.219. ISBN 978-1-61451-493-0.
