= Psilosis (disambiguation) =

Psilosis (from Greek ψίλωσις, "thinning out") can mean:

- Psilosis, the loss of the sound /h/ in the history of the Greek language
- Psilosis, another name for coeliac disease, also known as sprue
- Psilosis, another name for hair loss
- Sylosis, a British metal band
