= Arthur Ludwich =

German classical scholar (1840–1920)

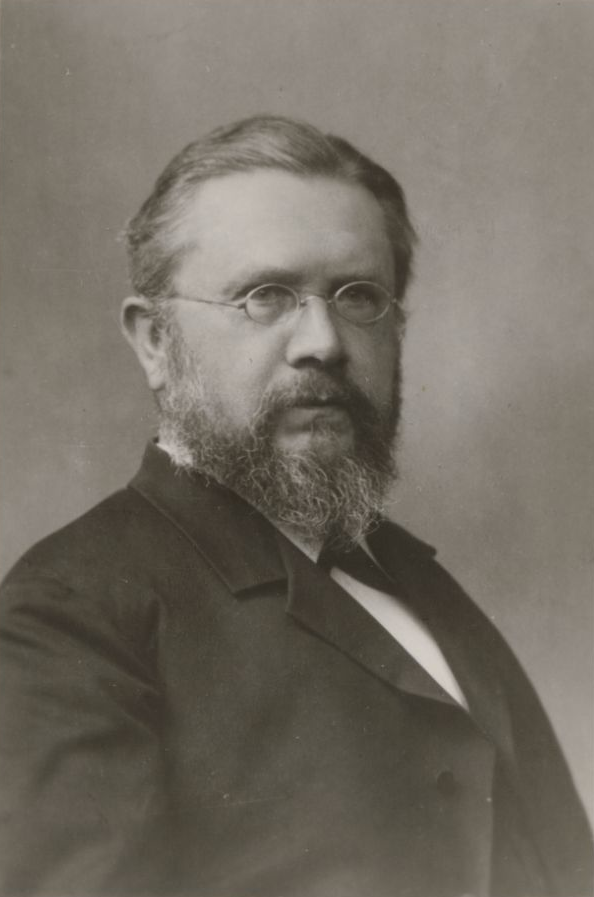
- Born: Constantin Hermann Arthur Ludwich; 18 May 1840; Lyck, East Prussia
- Died: 12 November 1920 (aged 80); Königsberg, Weimar Republic

Academic background
- Education: University of Königsberg
- Thesis: Quaestionis de hexametris poetarum Graecorum spondiacis capita duo (1866)
- Academic advisors: Karl Lehrs, Ludwig Friedländer

Academic work
- Institutions: University of Breslau; University of Königsberg
- Notable works: Aristarchs Homerische Textkritik (1884–1885); Homeri Odyssea (1889–1891); Homeri Ilias (1901–1902); Nonni Panopolitani Dionysiaca (1909–1911)

Constantin Hermann Arthur Ludwich (18 May 1840, Lyck in East Prussia – 12 November 1920, Königsberg) was a German classical philologist who specialized in Homeric studies. He is remembered for his observations involving the metric and prosody of Homer, for his edition of the Dionysiaca by Nonnus, and for coining the term "Viermännerkommentar" (i.e. "Four-Men Commentary", being Aristonicus, Didymus, Herodian and Nicanor) to define a lost ancient commentary to Homer's Iliad, survived in fragments prominently in the A-class of marginals.

He studied theology and classical philology at the University of Königsberg, where his instructors included Karl Lehrs and Ludwig Friedländer. In 1874–75 he conducted Homeric research in Italy, and during the following year, became an associate professor at the University of Breslau. In 1878 he succeeded Lehrs as professor of Greek philology at Königsberg.

== Selected publications ==
- Ludwich, Arthurius (1866). Quaestionis de hexametris poetarum Graecorum spondiacis capita duo (in Latin). Halle: Typis orphanotrophei.
- Ludwich, Arthur (1884–1885). Aristarchs Homerische Textkritik nach den Fragmenten des Didymos (in German). Vol. 1–2. Leipzig: B. G. Teubner. Vol. 1; vol. 2
- Ludwich, Arthurus (1889–1891). Homeri Odyssea (in Latin). Vol. 1–2. Leipzig: B. G. Teubner.
- Ludwich, Arthur (1898). Die Homervulgata als voralexandrinisch erwiesen (in German). Leipzig: B. G. Teubner.
- Ludwich, Arthurus (1901–1902). Homeri Ilias (in Latin). Vol. 1–2. Leipzig: B. G. Teubner.
- Ludwich, Arthur (1905). Anekdota zur griechischen Orthographie (in German). Vol. 1. Königsberg: Hartungsche Buchdruckerei.
- Ludwich, Arthur (1908). Homerischer Hymnenbau nebst seinen Nachahmungen bei Kallimachos, Theokrit, Vergil, Nonnos und Anderen (in German). Leipzig: S. Hirzel.
- Ludwich, Arthurus (1909–1911). Nonni Panopolitani Dionysiaca (in Latin). Vol. 1–2. Leipzig: B. G. Teubner.
