= Karl Lehrs =

German classical scholar (1802–1878)

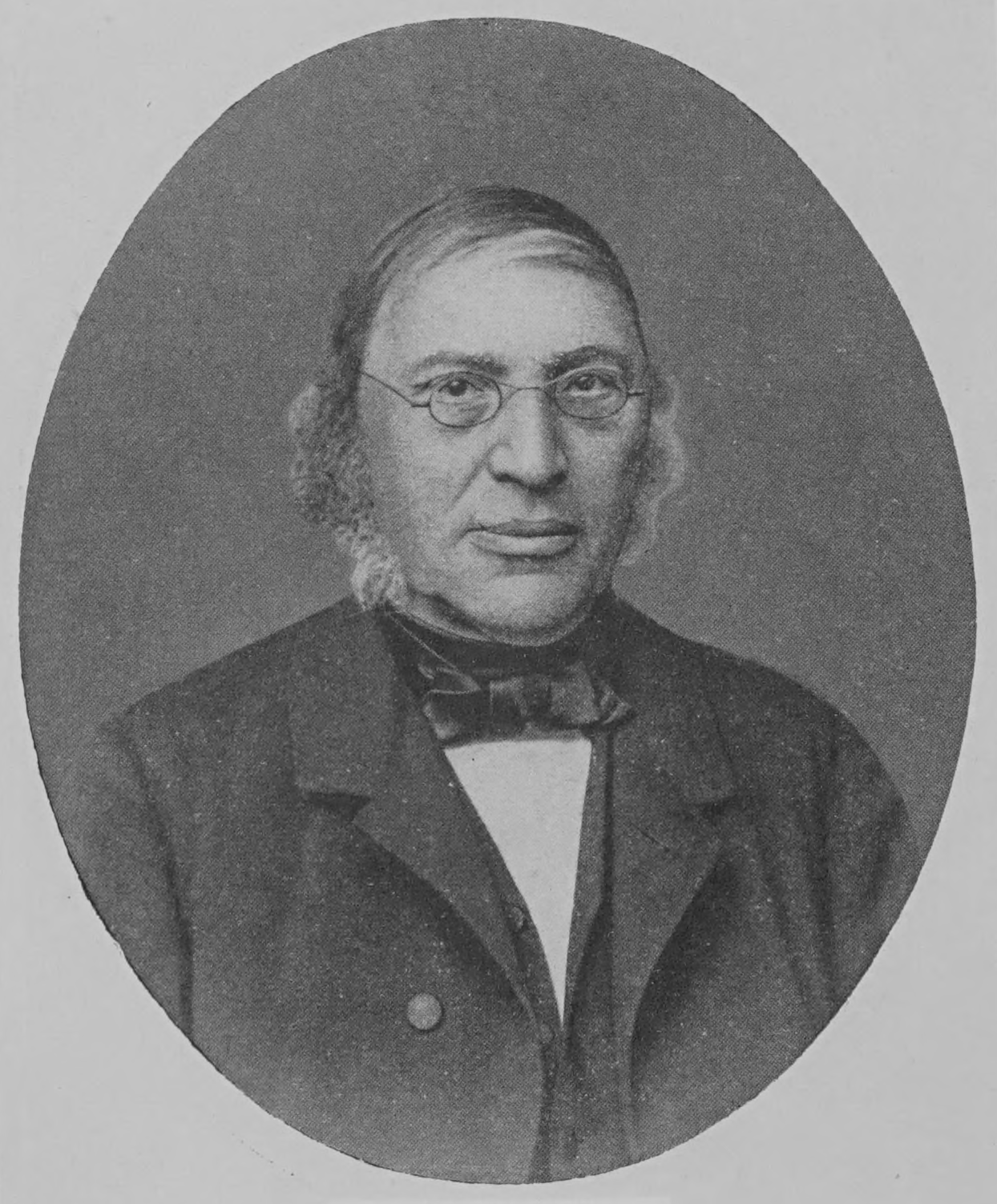
- Born: Kaufmann Levi; 14 January 1802; Königsberg, Kingdom of Prussia, Holy Roman Empire
- Died: 9 June 1878 (aged 76); Königsberg, Kingdom of Prussia, German Empire

Academic background
- Education: Friedrichskollegium; University of Königsberg
- Thesis: Quaestionum Aristarchearum specimen (1831)
- Academic advisors: Karl Lachmann, Christian August Lobeck

Academic work
- Discipline: Classical philology
- Institutions: University of Königsberg
- Notable students: Arthur Ludwich, Ludwig Friedländer, August Lentz
- Notable works: De Aristarchi studiis Homericis (1833; 3rd ed. 1882)

Karl Lehrs (born Kaufmann Levi; January 14, 1802 – June 9, 1878) was a German classical scholar, known for his foundational contributions to the study of the Greek grammarians, especially Aristarchus. A lifelong resident of Königsberg and a prominent figure of its philological circle, he has been described as "with Bernhardy and Bernays one of the great Jewish classicists of the pre-Wilamowitzian generation".

== Biography ==
Lehrs was born in Königsberg, the son of merchant Pinkus Kaufmann Levi (Lehrs since 1812) and Fanny Jacob. He studied under Karl Lachmann at the Friedrichskollegium and Christian August Lobeck at the University of Königsberg, becoming friendly with both men and maintaining a long-term correspondence with Lachmann. Career considerations, coupled with Lachmann's influence and his own family's fading religious sentiment, prompted him to convert from Judaism to Christianity in 1822, adopting the first name Karl after his conversion. He obtained his doctorate at Königsberg in 1823; after some years' employment as a schoolteacher, during which he had occasion to meet and work with August Meineke, he completed his Habilitation in 1831 with a dissertation on Aristarchus.

In 1835 Lehrs was appointed professor extraordinarius of classical philology at the University of Königsberg. He nevertheless continued to work as a schoolmaster until 1845, the increased workload taking a toll on his health which would take years to recover. In 1845 he was promoted to professor ordinarius, a position he held until his death. His students at Königsberg include Arthur Ludwich, Ludwig Friedländer and August Lentz. He turned down an appointment to the Leipzig chair (previously held by Gottfried Hermann) in 1849; he instead led a quiet life in East Prussia, which he never left after 1844. He died of a bladder disease in Königsberg in 1878.

Lehrs emerged as the head of what Conrad Bursian termed the "Königsberg School", (Note: German: Die Königsberger Schule) a circle of scholars who attached special importance to: Greek grammatical studies of the Hellenistic, Roman and Byzantine periods; the language and meter of archaic and later Greek epic; and Greek religious views, with a focus on the perceived ethical content of the myths. His 1833 monograph De Aristarchi studiis Homericis—called his magnum opus by Sotera Fornaro—concerned Aristarchus' critical and exegetical approach to the Homeric poems, making use of the evidence preserved in the A-scholia to the Iliad and published by Villoison in 1788. Though limited by the contemporary lack of critical editions of the Homeric scholia, Lehrs laid the foundation for modern Aristarchean scholarship. He coined the term quattuor grammatici to indicate a major source underlying the A-scholia, which was translated into German as Viermännerkommentar by Ludwich.

== Selected publications ==
=== Academic works ===
- Lehrs, Karl (1833). De Aristarchi studiis Homericis (in Latin). Königsberg: Sumtibus fratrum Borntraeger. 2nd ed., 3rd ed.
- Lehrs, Karl (1837). Quaestiones epicae (in Latin). Königsberg: Sumtibus fratrum Bornträger.
- Lehrs, Karl (1846). Analecta grammatica (in Latin). Königsberg: Samter & Rathke.
- Lehrs, Karl (1848). Herodiani scripta tria emendatiora. Accedunt analecta (in Latin). Königsberg: A. D. Samter.
- Lehrs, Karl (1856). Populäre Aufsätze aus dem Alterthum (in German). Leipzig: B. G. Teubner. 2nd ed.
- Lehrs, Karl (1869). Q. Horatius Flaccus. Mit vorzugsweiser Rücksicht auf die unechten Stellen und Gedichte (in German). Leipzig: F. C. W. Vogel.
- Lehrs, Karl (1873). Die Pindarscholien. Eine kritische Untersuchung zur philologischen Quellenkunde (in German). Leipzig: S. Hirzel.
- Ludwich, Arthur, ed. (1902). Kleine Schriften von Karl Lehrs (in German). Königsberg: Hartungsche Verlagsdruckerei.

=== Correspondence ===
- von Farenheid, Fritz, ed. (1878). Briefe von Carl Lehrs an einen Freund (in German). Königsberg: Hartungsche Buchdruckerei.
- Ludwich, Arthur, ed. (1894). Ausgewählte Briefe von und an Chr. A. Lobeck und K. Lehrs nebst Tagebuchnotizen (in German). Vol. 1–2. Leipzig: Duncker & Humblot.
