= Spurious diphthong =

Greek long vowels written as diphthongs

A spurious diphthong (or false diphthong) is an Ancient Greek vowel that is etymologically a long vowel but written exactly like a true diphthong ει, ου (ei, ou).

== Origin ==
A spurious diphthong has two origins: from compensatory lengthening of short ε, ο (e, o) after deletion of a consonant:

- *mónt-ya or *móntʰ-ya → *mónsa (assibilation from palatalization) → Μοῦσα "Muse"
- *doter-ya → δότειρα "giver" (feminine; compare masculine δοτήρ)

or contraction of two vowels:

- φιλέ-ετε → φιλεῖτε "you (pl.) love"
- νόος → νοῦς "mind"

In general, spurious ει, ου contracts from ε, ο + ε, ο, ει, ου. The specific rules are more complex.

== True diphthongs ==
By contrast, true diphthongs are e or o placed before i or u. Some come from e-grade of ablaut + i, or o-grade + u, co-existing beside forms with the other grade:

- λείπω "I leave" (e-grade: genuine diphthong) — λέ-λοιπα "I have left" (o-grade)
- *eleútʰ-somai → ἐλεύσομαι "I will come" (e-grade) — Homeric εἰλ-ήλουθα "I have come" (o-grade)
- Proto-Greek *akouyō → ἀκούω "I hear"

== Pronunciation ==
Early in the history of Greek, the diphthong versions of ει and ου were pronounced as [ei̯, ou̯], the long vowel versions as [eː, oː]. By the Classical period, the diphthong and long vowel (i.e., the spurious diphthong) had merged in pronunciation and were both pronounced as long monophthongs [eː, oː].

By the time of Koine Greek, ει and ου had shifted to [iː, uː]. (The shift of a Greek vowel to i is called iotacism.) In Modern Greek, distinctive vowel length has been lost, and all vowels are pronounced short: [i, u].

== Other dialects ==
Long e and o existed in two forms in Attic-Ionic: ει, ου and η, ω (ē, ō). In earlier Severer Doric, by contrast, only η, ω counted as a long vowel, and it was the vowel of contraction. In later forms of Doric, it contracted to ει, ου. Throughout the history of Doric, compensatory lengthening resulted in η, ω.

"Severe" refers to the sterner-sounding open pronunciation of η, ω [ɛː, ɔː], in contrast to the closer ει, ου [eː, oː].
