= Koine Greek =

Dialect of Greek in the ancient world

- ἡ κοινὴ διάλεκτος
- Region: Hellenistic Greece, Macedon, Ptolemaic Kingdom, Seleucid Empire and other Hellenistic Kingdoms, Roman Empire, Eastern Roman Empire
- Ethnicity: Greeks
- Era: c. 300 BC – AD 600 (developed into Medieval Greek, survives as the liturgical language of the Greek Orthodox and the Greek Catholic churches)
- Language family: Indo-European: Hellenic; Greek; Attic–Ionic; Attic; Koine Greek
- Early forms: Proto-Greek: Ancient Greek
- Writing system: Greek alphabet

Language codes
- ISO 639-3: ecg (a proposal to use ecg was rejected in 2023)
- Glottolog: koin1234

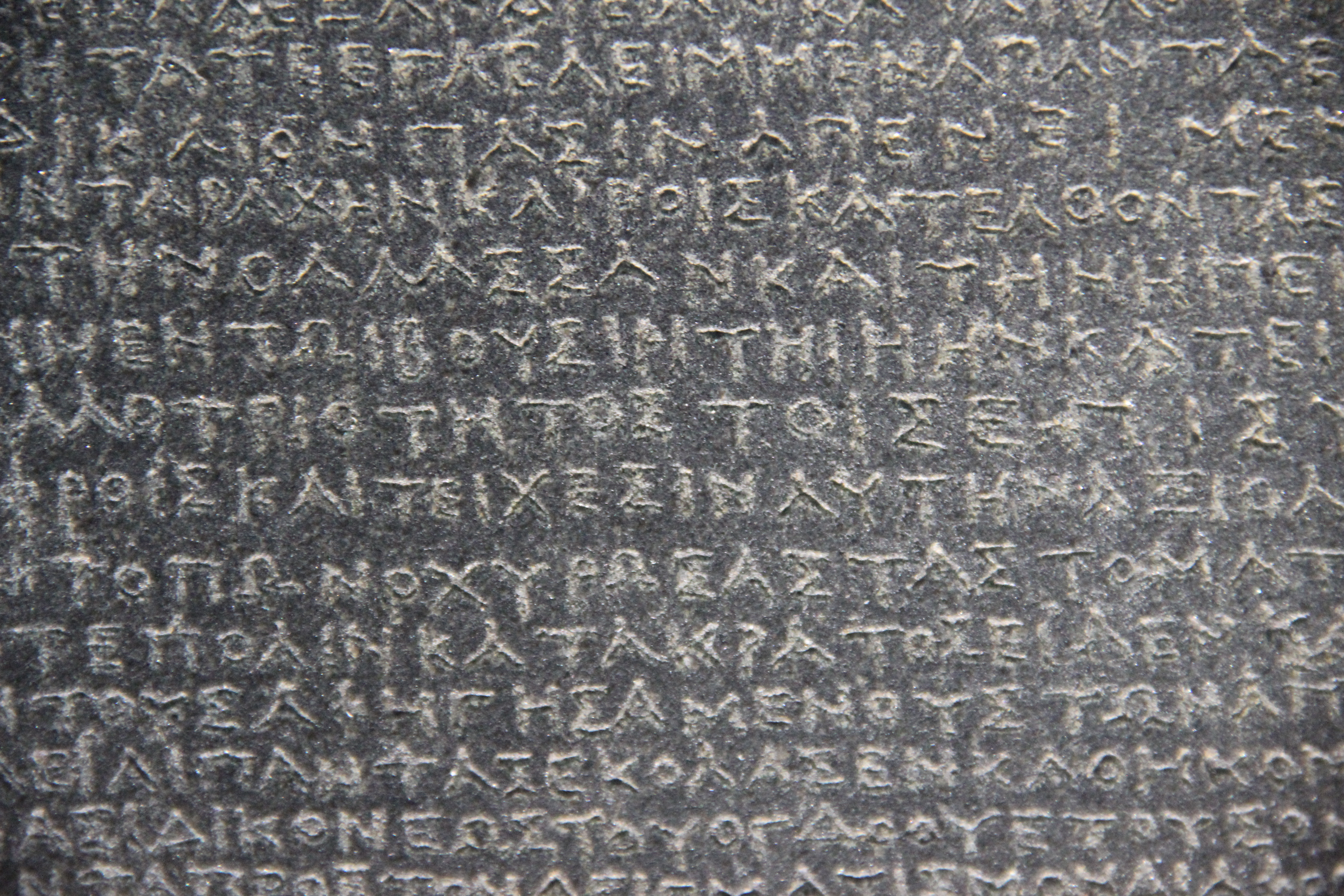
Greek script from the Rosetta Stone decree issued in the Ptolemaic Kingdom, 2nd century BC

Koine Greek (Note: Pronunciation: UK: /ˈkɔɪ.ni/ KOY-nee, US: /ˈkɔɪ.neɪ/ KOY-nay or /kɔɪ.ˈneɪ/ koy-NAY.) (ἡ κοινὴ διάλεκτος, hē koinḕ diálektos, lit. 'the common dialect'), (Note: Pronunciation: [(h)e̝ kyˈne̝ diˈalektos], later [i cyˈni ðiˈalektos].) also variously known as Hellenistic Greek, Biblical Greek, Septuagint Greek or New Testament Greek, was the common supra-regional form of Greek spoken and written during the Hellenistic period, the Roman Empire, and the early Byzantine Empire. It evolved from the spread of Greek following the conquests of Alexander the Great in the fourth century BC, and served as the lingua franca of much of the Mediterranean region and the Middle East during the following centuries. It was based mainly on Attic and related Ionic speech forms, with various admixtures brought about through dialect levelling with other varieties.

Koine Greek included styles ranging from conservative literary forms to the spoken vernaculars of the time. As the dominant language of the Byzantine Empire, it developed further into Medieval Greek, which informed Modern Greek.

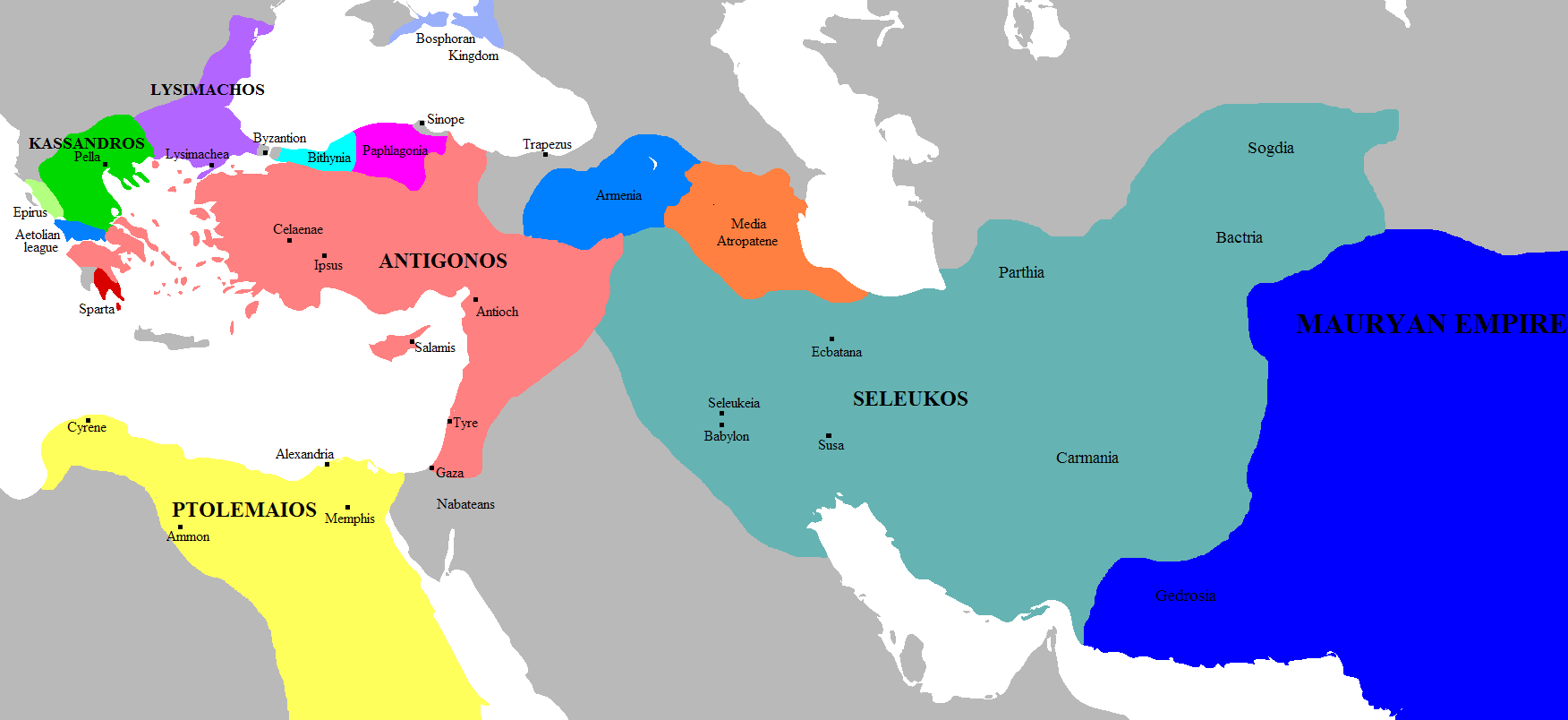
The Successor kingdoms before the battle of Ipsus, 303 BC

Linguistic map of the Roman Empire c. 400

Literary Koine was the medium of much post-classical Greek literary and scholarly writing, such as the works of Plutarch and Polybius. Koine is also the language of the Septuagint (the 3rd century BC Greek translation of the Hebrew Bible), the Christian New Testament, and of most early Christian theological writing by the Church Fathers. In this context, Koine Greek is also known as "Biblical", "New Testament", "ecclesiastical", or "patristic" Greek. The Roman Emperor Marcus Aurelius wrote his private thoughts in Koine Greek in a work that is now known as Meditations. Koine Greek continues to be used as the liturgical language of services in the Greek Orthodox Church and in some Greek Catholic churches.

== Name ==
The English-language name Koine is derived from the Koine Greek term ἡ κοινὴ διάλεκτος (hē koinḕ diálektos), meaning "the common dialect". The Greek word κοινή (koinḗ) itself means "common". The word is pronounced /kɔɪˈneɪ/, /ˈkɔɪneɪ/, or /kiːˈniː/ in US English and /ˈkɔɪniː/ in UK English. The pronunciation of the word koine itself gradually changed from [koinéː] (close to the Classical Attic pronunciation [koi̯.nɛ̌ː]) to [cyˈni] (close to the Modern Greek [ciˈni]). In Modern Greek, the language is referred to as Ελληνιστική Κοινή, "Hellenistic Koiné", in the sense of "Hellenistic supraregional language".

Ancient scholars used the term koine in several distinct senses. In the 2nd century, scholars such as Apollonius Dyscolus and Aelius Herodianus maintained the term koine to refer to the Proto-Greek language, while others used it to refer to any vernacular form of Greek speech which differed somewhat from the literary language.

When Koine Greek became a language of literature by the 1st century BC, some people distinguished two forms: written as the literary post-classical form (which should not be confused with Atticism) and the vernacular. Others chose to refer to Koine as "the dialect of Alexandria" or "Alexandrian dialect" (ἡ Ἀλεξανδρέων διάλεκτος), or even the universal dialect of its time. Modern classicists have often used the former sense.

== Origins and history ==
Koine Greek arose as a common dialect within the armies of Alexander the Great. Under the leadership of Macedon, their newly formed common variety was spoken from the Ptolemaic Kingdom of Egypt to the Seleucid Empire of Mesopotamia. It replaced existing ancient Greek dialects with an everyday form that people anywhere could understand. Though elements of Koine Greek took shape in Classical Greece, the post-Classical period of Greek is defined as beginning with the death of Alexander the Great in 323 BC, when cultures under Greek sway in turn began to influence the language.

In its eastern provinces, the Roman Empire communicated almost exclusively in Greek, even in areas where Greek was not the dominant spoken language. Local elites and communities, including those in Asia Minor, Arabia, Judaea, Syria, and Egypt, used Greek in inscriptions, documents, and official announcements.

The passage into the next period, known as Medieval Greek, is sometimes dated from the foundation of Constantinople by Constantine the Great in 330 AD, but often only from the end of late antiquity. The post-Classical period of Greek thus refers to the creation and evolution of Koine Greek throughout the entire Hellenistic and Roman eras of history until the start of the Middle Ages.

The linguistic roots of the Common Greek dialect had been unclear since ancient times. During the Hellenistic period, most scholars thought of Koine as the result of the mixture of the four main Ancient Greek dialects, "ἡ ἐκ τῶν τεττάρων συνεστῶσα" (the composition of the Four). This view was supported in the early twentieth century by Paul Kretschmer in his book Die Entstehung der Koine (1901), while Ulrich von Wilamowitz-Moellendorff and Antoine Meillet, based on the intense Ionic elements of the Koine – σσ instead of ττ and ρσ instead of ρρ (θάλασσα – θάλαττα, 'sea'; ἀρσενικός – ἀρρενικός, 'potent, virile') – considered Koine to be a simplified form of Ionic.

The view accepted by most scholars today was given by the Greek linguist Georgios Hatzidakis, who showed that despite the "composition of the Four", the "stable nucleus" of Koine Greek is Attic. In other words, Koine Greek can be regarded as Attic with the admixture of elements especially from Ionic, but also from other dialects. The degree of importance of the non-Attic linguistic elements on Koine can vary depending on the region of the Hellenistic world.

In that respect, the varieties of Koine spoken in the Ionian colonies of Anatolia (e.g. Pontus, cf. Pontic Greek) would have more intense Ionic characteristics than others and those of Laconia and Cyprus would preserve some Doric and Arcadocypriot characteristics, respectively. The literary Koine of the Hellenistic age resembles Attic in such a degree that it is often mentioned as Attic Koine.

== Sources ==
The first scholars who studied Koine, both in Alexandrian and early modern times, were classicists whose prototype had been the literary Attic Greek of the Classical period and frowned upon any other variety of Ancient Greek. Koine Greek was therefore considered a decayed form of Greek which was not worthy of attention.

The reconsideration on the historical and linguistic importance of Koine Greek began only in the early 19th century, where renowned scholars conducted a series of studies on the evolution of Koine throughout the entire Hellenistic period and Roman Empire. The sources used on the studies of Koine have been numerous and of unequal reliability. The most significant ones are the inscriptions of the post-Classical periods and the papyri, for being two kinds of texts which have authentic content and can be studied directly.

Other significant sources are the Septuagint (the Greek translation of the Hebrew Bible) and the Greek New Testament. The teaching of these texts was aimed at the most common people, and for that reason, they use the most popular language of the era.

Other sources can be based on random findings such as inscriptions on vases written by popular painters, mistakes made by Atticists due to their imperfect knowledge of Attic Greek or even some surviving Greco-Latin glossaries of the Roman period, e.g.:

Καλήμερον, ἦλθες;
Bono die, venisti?
Good day, you came?

Ἐὰν θέληις, ἐλθὲ μεθ' ἡμῶν.
Si vis, veni mecum.
If you want, come with us. (Note: The Latin gloss in the source erroneously has "with me", while the Greek means "with us".)

Ποῦ;
Ubi?
Where?

Πρὸς φίλον ἡμέτερον Λύκιον.
Ad amicum nostrum Lucium.
To our friend Lucius.

Τί γὰρ ἔχει;
Quid enim habet?
Indeed, what does he have?
What is it with him?

Ἀρρωστεῖ.
Aegrotat.
He's sick.

Finally, a very important source of information on the ancient Koine is the modern Greek language with all its dialects and its own Koine form, which have preserved some of the ancient language's oral linguistic details which the written tradition has lost. For example, Pontic and Cappadocian Greek preserved the ancient pronunciation of η as ε (νύφε, συνέλικος, τίμεσον, πεγάδι for standard Modern Greek νύφη, συνήλικος, τίμησον, πηγάδι etc.), (Note: On the other hand, not all scholars agree that the Pontic pronunciation of η as ε is an archaism. Apart from the improbability that the sound change /ɛː/>/e̝(ː)/>/i/ did not occur in this important region of the Roman Empire, Horrocks notes that ε can be written in certain contexts for any letter or digraph representing /i/ in other dialects–e.g. ι, ει, οι, or υ, which were never pronounced /ɛː/ in Ancient Greek–not just η (cf. όνερον, κοδέσπενα, λεχάρι for standard όνειρο, οικοδέσποινα, λυχάρι.) He therefore attributes this feature of East Greek to vowel weakening, paralleling the omission of unstressed vowels. Horrocks (2010: 400)) while the Tsakonian language preserved the long α instead of η (ἁμέρα, ἀστραπά, λίμνα, χοά etc.) and the other local characteristics of Doric Greek.

Dialects from the southern part of the Greek-speaking regions (Dodecanese, Cyprus, etc.), preserve the pronunciation of the double similar consonants (ἄλ-λος, Ἑλ-λάδα, θάλασ-σα), while others pronounce in many words υ as ου or preserve ancient double forms (κρόμμυον – κρεμ-μυον, ράξ – ρώξ etc.). Linguistic phenomena like the above imply that those characteristics survived within Koine, which in turn had countless variations in the Greek-speaking world.

== Types ==
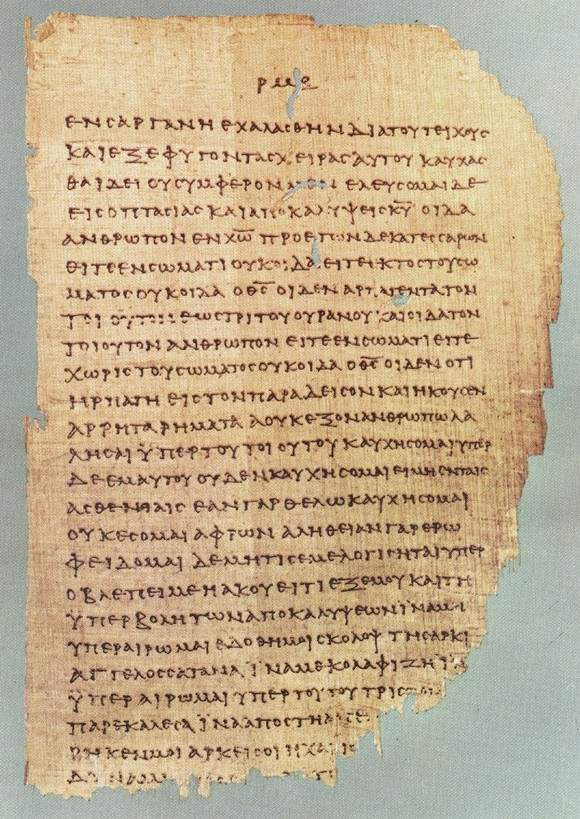
Papyrus 46 is one of the oldest extant New Testament manuscripts in Greek, written on papyrus, with its 'most probable date' between 175 and 225.

=== Biblical Koine ===
Biblical Koine refers to the varieties of Koine Greek used in Bible translations into Greek and related texts. Its main sources are:

- The Septuagint, a 3rd-century BC Greek translation of the Hebrew Bible (Old Testament) and texts not included in the Hebrew Bible;
- The Greek New Testament, composed originally in Greek.

==== Septuagint Greek ====
There has been some debate to what degree Biblical Greek represents the mainstream of contemporary spoken Koine and to what extent it contains specifically Semitic substratum features. These could have been induced either through the practice of translating closely from Biblical Hebrew or Aramaic originals, or through the influence of the regional non-standard Greek spoken by originally Aramaic-speaking Hellenized Jews.

Some of the features discussed in this context are the Septuagint's normative absence of the particles μέν and δέ, and the use of ἐγένετο to denote "it came to pass". Some features of Biblical Greek which are thought to have originally been non-standard elements eventually found their way into the main of the Greek language.

H. St. J. Thackeray, in A Grammar of the Old Testament in Greek According to the Septuagint (1909), wrote that only the five books of the Pentateuch, parts of the Book of Joshua and the Book of Isaiah may be considered "good Koine". One issue debated by scholars is whether and how much the translation of the Pentateuch influenced the rest of the Septuagint, including the translation of Isaiah.

Another point that scholars have debated is the use of ἐκκλησία ekklēsía as a translation for the Hebrew קָהָל qāhāl. Old Testament scholar James Barr has been critical of etymological arguments that ekklēsía refers to "the community called by God to constitute his People". Kyriakoula Papademetriou explains:

He maintains that ἐκκλησία is merely used for designating the notion of meeting and gathering of men, without any particular character. Therefore, etymologizing this word could be needless, or even misleading, when it could guide to false meanings, for example that ἐκκλησία is a name used for the people of God, Israel.

==== New Testament Greek ====
The authors of the New Testament follow the Septuagint translations for over half their quotations from the Old Testament.

The "historical present" tense is a term used for present tense verbs that are used in some narrative sections of the New Testament to describe events that are in the past with respect to the speaker. This is seen more in works attributed to Mark and John than Luke. It is used 151 times in the Gospel of Mark in passages where a reader might expect a past tense verb. Scholars have presented various explanations for this; in the early 20th century some scholars argued that the use of the historical present tense in Mark was due to the influence of Aramaic, but this theory fell out of favor in the 1960s. Another group of scholars believed the historical present tense was used to heighten the dramatic effect, and this interpretation was favored in the New American Bible translation. In Volume II of the 1929 edition of A Grammar of the New Testament, W.F. Howard argues that the heavy use of the historical present in Herodotus and Thucydides, compared with the relatively infrequent usage by Polybius and Xenophon was evidence that heavy use of this verb tense is a feature of vernacular Koine, but other scholars have argued that the historical present can be a literary form to "denote semantic shifts to more prominent material."

=== Patristic Greek ===
The term patristic Greek is sometimes used for the Greek written by the Greek Church Fathers, the Early Christian theologians in late antiquity. Christian writers in the earliest time tended to use a simple register of Koiné, relatively close to the spoken language of their time, following the model of the Bible. After the 4th century, when Christianity became the state church of the Roman Empire, more learned registers of Koiné also came to be used.

== Differences between Attic and Koine Greek ==
Koine period Greek differs from Classical Greek in many ways: grammar, word formation, vocabulary and phonology (sound system).

=== Phonology ===
During the period generally designated as Koine Greek, a great deal of phonological change occurred. At the start of the period, the pronunciation was virtually identical to Ancient Greek phonology, whereas in the end, it had much more in common with Modern Greek phonology.

The three most significant changes were the loss of vowel length distinction, the replacement of the pitch accent system by a stress accent system, and the monophthongization of several diphthongs:

- The ancient distinction between long and short vowels was gradually lost, and from the second century BC all vowels were isochronic (having equal length).
- From the second century BC, the Ancient Greek pitch accent was replaced with a stress accent.
- Psilosis: loss of rough breathing, /h/. Rough breathing had already been lost in the Ionic Greek varieties of Anatolia and the Aeolic Greek of Lesbos.
- The diphthongs ᾱͅ, ῃ, ῳ /aːi eːi oːi/ were respectively simplified to the long vowels ᾱ, η, ω /aː eː oː/.
- The diphthongs αι, ει, and οι became monophthongs. αι, which had already been pronounced as /ɛː/ by the Boeotians since the 4th century BC and written η (e.g. πῆς, χῆρε, μέμφομη), became in Koine, too, first a long vowel /ɛː/ and then, with the loss of distinctive vowel length and openness distinction /e/, merging with ε. The diphthong ει had already merged with ι in the 5th century BC in Argos, and by the 4th century BC in Corinth (e.g. ΛΕΓΙΣ), and it acquired this pronunciation also in Koine. The diphthong οι fronted to /y/, merging with υ. The diphthong υι came to be pronounced [yj], but eventually lost its final element and also merged with υ. The diphthong ου had been already raised to /u/ in the 6th century BC, and remains so in Modern Greek.
- The diphthongs αυ and ευ came to be pronounced [av ev] (via [aβ eβ]), but are partly assimilated to [af ef] before the voiceless consonants θ, κ, ξ, π, σ, τ, φ, χ, and ψ.
- Simple vowels mostly preserved their ancient pronunciations. η /e/ (classically pronounced /ɛː/) was raised and merged with ι. In the 10th century AD, υ/οι /y/ unrounded to merge with ι. These changes are known as iotacism.
- The consonants also preserved their ancient pronunciations to a great extent, except β, γ, δ, φ, θ, χ and ζ. Β, Γ, Δ, which were originally pronounced /b ɡ d/, became the fricatives /v/ (via [β]), /ɣ/, /ð/, which they still are today, except when preceded by a nasal consonant (μ, ν); in that case, they retain their ancient pronunciations (e.g. γαμβρός > γαμπρός [ɣamˈbros], ἄνδρας > άντρας [ˈandras], ἄγγελος > άγγελος [ˈaŋɟelos]). The latter three (Φ, Θ, Χ), which were initially pronounced as aspirates (/pʰ tʰ kʰ/ respectively), developed into the fricatives /f/ (via [ɸ]), /θ/, and /x/. Finally ζ, which is still metrically categorised as a double consonant with ξ and ψ because it may have initially been pronounced as σδ [zd] or δσ [dz], later acquired its modern-day value of /z/.

==== New Testament Greek phonology ====
The Koine-period Greek in the table is taken from a reconstruction by Benjamin Kantor of New Testament Judeo-Palestinian Koine Greek. The realizations of most phonemes reflect general changes around the Greek-speaking world, including vowel isochrony and monophthongization, but certain sound values differ from other Koine varieties such as Attic, Egyptian and Anatolian.

More general Koine phonological developments include the spirantization of Γ, with palatal allophone before front-vowels and a plosive allophone after nasals, and β. φ, θ and χ still preserve their ancient aspirated plosive values, while the unaspirated stops π, τ, κ have perhaps begun to develop voiced allophones after nasals. Initial aspiration has also likely become an optional sound for many speakers of the popular variety. (Note: For convenience, the rough breathing mark represents /h/, even if it was not commonly used in contemporary orthography. Parentheses denote the loss of the sound.) Monophthongization (including the initial stage in the fortition of the second element in the αυ/ευ diphthongs) and the loss of vowel-timing distinctions are carried through. On the other hand, Kantor argues for certain vowel qualities differing from the rest of the Koine in the Judean dialect. Although it is impossible to know the exact realizations of vowels, it is tentatively argued that the mid-vowels ε/αι and η had a more open pronunciation than other Koine dialects, distinguished as open-mid /ɛ/ vs. close-mid /e/, rather than as true-mid /e̞/ vs. close-mid /e̝/ as has been suggested for other varieties such as Egyptian. This is evidenced on the basis of Hebrew transcriptions of ε with pataḥ/qamets /a/ and not tsere/segol /e/. Additionally, it is posited that α perhaps had a back vowel pronunciation as /ɑ/, dragged backwards due to the opening of ε. Influence of the Aramaic substrate could have also caused confusion between α and ο, providing further evidence for the back vowel realization.

letter	Greek	transliteration	IPA
Alpha	α	a	/ɑ/
Beta	β	b	/b/ ([b, β])
Gamma	γ	g	/ɣ/ ([ɣ, g, ʝ])
Delta	δ	d	/d/
Epsilon	ε	e	/ɛ/
Zeta	ζ	z	/z/
Eta	η	ē	/e/
Theta	θ	th	/tʰ/
Iota	ι	i	/i/
Kappa	κ	k	/k/ ([k, g])
Lambda	λ	l	/l/ ([ʎ](?)
Mu	μ	m	/m/
Nu	ν	n	/n/ ([n, m])
Xi	ξ	x	/ks/
Omicron	ο	o	/o̞/
Pi	π	p	/p/ ([p, b])
Rho	ρ	r	/r/
Sigma	σ (-σ-/-σσ-)	s (-s-/-ss-)	/s/ ([s, z])
Tau	τ	t	/t/ ([t, d])
Upsilon	υ	y	/y/
Phi	φ	ph	/pʰ/
Chi	χ	ch	/kʰ/
Psi	ψ	ps	/ps/
Omega	ω	ō	/o/
.	αι	ai	/ɛ/
.	ει	ei	/i/
.	οι	oi	/y/
.	υι	yi	/yi/ (or /y/)
.	αυ	au	[ɑɸ(ʷ), ɑβ(ʷ)]
.	ευ	eu	[ɛɸ(ʷ), ɛβ(ʷ)]
.	ου	ou	/u/
.	αι (ᾳ)	āi	/ɑ/
.	ηι (ῃ)	ēi	/i/
.	ωι (ῳ)	ōi	/o/
.	῾	h	(/h/)

== Ancient Macedonian Contribution ==
As a consequence of the Macedonians' role in the formation of Koine Greek, Ancient Macedonian contributed considerable elements to the language, including some military terminology (διμοιρίτης, ταξίαρχος, ὑπασπισταί, etc.). Among the many contributions were the general use of the first declension grammar for male and female nouns with an -as ending, attested in the genitive of Macedonian coinage from the early 4th century BC of Amyntas III (ΑΜΥΝΤΑ in the genitive; the Attic form that fell into disuse would be ΑΜΥΝΤΟΥ). There were changes in verb conjugation such as in the imperative δέξα dexa attested in Macedonian sling stones found in Asiatic battlefields, that became adopted in place of the Attic forms. Koine Greek established a spirantisation of beta, gamma, and delta, which has been attributed to the Macedonian influence. The term "Macedonian" ended up meaning the Koine Greek in classical sources.

== Sample Koine texts ==
The following texts show differences from Attic Greek in all aspects – grammar, morphology, vocabulary and can be inferred to show differences in phonology.

The following comments illustrate the phonological development within the period of Koine. The phonetic transcriptions are tentative and are intended to illustrate two different stages in the reconstructed development, an early conservative variety still relatively close to Classical Attic, and a somewhat later, more progressive variety approaching Modern Greek in some respects.

=== Sample 1 – A Roman decree ===
The following excerpt, from a decree of the Roman Senate to the town of Thisbae in Boeotia in 170 BC, is rendered in a reconstructed pronunciation representing a hypothetical conservative variety of mainland Greek Koiné in the early Roman period. The transcription shows raising of η to /eː/, partial (pre-consonantal/word-final) raising of ῃ and ει to /iː/, retention of pitch accent, and retention of word-initial /h/ (the rough breathing).

περὶ ὧν Θισ[β]εῖς λόγους ἐποιήσαντο· περὶ τῶν καθ᾿ αὑ[τ]οὺς πραγμάτων, οἵτινες ἐν τῇ φιλίᾳ τῇ ἡμετέρᾳ ἐνέμειναν, ὅπως αὐτοῖς δοθῶσιν [ο]ἷς τὰ καθ᾿ αὑτοὺς πράγματα ἐξηγήσωνται, περὶ τούτου τοῦ πράγματος οὕτως ἔδοξεν· ὅπως Κόιντος Μαίνιος στρατηγὸς τῶν ἐκ τῆς συνκλήτου [π]έντε ἀποτάξῃ οἳ ἂν αὐτῷ ἐκ τῶν δημοσίων πρα[γμ]άτων καὶ τῆς ἰδίας πίστεως φαίνωνται.
peri hoːn tʰizbîːs lóɡuːs epojéːsanto; peri toːn katʰ hautùːs praːɡmátoːn, hoítines en tiː pʰilíaːi tiː heːmetéraːi enémiːnan, hópoːs autois dotʰôːsin hois ta katʰ hautùːs práːɡmata ekseːɡéːsoːntai, peri túːtuː tuː práːɡmatos húːtoːs édoksen; hópoːs ˈkʷintos ˈmainios strateːɡòs toːn ek teːs syŋkléːtuː pénte apotáksiː, hoi an autoːi ek toːn deːmosíoːn praːɡmátoːn kai teːs idíaːs písteoːs pʰaínoːntai
Concerning those matters about which the citizens of Thisbae made representations. Concerning their own affairs: the following decision was taken concerning the proposal that those who remained true to our friendship should be given the facilities to conduct their own affairs; that our praetor/governor Quintus Maenius should delegate five members of the senate who seemed to him appropriate in the light of their public actions and individual good faith.

=== Sample 2 – Greek New Testament ===
The following excerpt, the beginning of the Gospel of John, is rendered in a reconstructed pronunciation representing a progressive popular variety of Koiné in the early Christian era. Modernizing features include the loss of vowel length distinction, monophthongization, transition to stress accent, and raising of η to /i/. Also seen here are the bilabial fricative pronunciation of diphthongs αυ and ευ, loss of initial /h/, fricative values for β and γ, and partial post-nasal voicing of voiceless stops.

Ἐν ἀρχῇ ἦν ὁ λόγος, καὶ ὁ λόγος ἦν πρὸς τὸν θεόν, καὶ θεὸς ἦν ὁ λόγος. οὗτος ἦν ἐν ἀρχῇ πρὸς τὸν θεόν. πάντα δι᾽ αὐτοῦ ἐγένετο, καὶ χωρὶς αὐτοῦ ἐγένετο οὐδὲ ἕν ὃ γέγονεν. ἐν αὐτῷ ζωὴ ἦν, καὶ ἡ ζωὴ ἦν τὸ φῶς τῶν ἀνθρώπων. καὶ τὸ φῶς ἐν τῇ σκοτίᾳ φαίνει, καὶ ἡ σκοτία αὐτὸ οὐ κατέλαβεν.
ˈen arˈkʰi in o ˈloɣos, ke o ˈloɣos im bros to(n) tʰeˈo(n), ke tʰeˈos in o ˈloɣos. ˈutos in en arˈkʰi pros to(n) tʰeˈo(n). ˈpanda di aɸˈtu eˈʝeneto, ke kʰoˈris aɸˈtu eˈʝeneto ude ˈen o ˈʝeɣonen. en aɸˈto zoˈi in, ke i zoˈi in to pʰos ton anˈtʰropon; ke to pʰos en di skoˈtia ˈpʰeni, ke i skoˈti(a) a(ɸ)ˈto u kaˈtelaβen
In the beginning was the Word, and the Word was with God, and the Word was God. He was in the beginning with God. All things were made by Him; and without Him was not anything made that was made. In Him was life, and the life was the light of men. And the light shines in darkness; and the darkness comprehended it not (ESV translation uses alternate wording: "the darkness has not overcome it".)

== Bibliography ==
- Abel, F.-M. Grammaire du grec biblique.
- Allen, W. Sidney, Vox Graeca: a guide to the pronunciation of classical Greek – 3rd ed., Cambridge University Press, 1987. ISBN 0-521-33555-8
- Andriotis, Nikolaos P. History of the Greek Language
- Buth, Randall, Ἡ κοινὴ προφορά: Koine Greek of Early Roman Period
- Conybeare, F.C. and Stock, St. George. Grammar of Septuagint Greek: With Selected Readings, Vocabularies, and Updated Indexes.
- Horrocks, Geoffrey C. (2010). Greek: A history of the language and its speakers (2nd ed.). Oxford: Blackwell.
- Kantor, Benjamin (2023), The Pronunciation of New Testament Greek Judeo-Palestinian Greek Phonology and Orthography from Alexander to Islam, Eerdmans, ISBN 9780802878311.
- Smyth, Herbert Weir (1956), Greek Grammar, Harvard University Press, ISBN 978-0-674-36250-5.
