= Arcadius of Antioch =

Arcadius of Antioch (Ancient Greek: Ἀρκάδιος ὁ Ἀντιοχεύς) was a Greek grammarian who flourished in the 2nd century CE. According to the Suda, he wrote treatises on orthography and syntax, and an onomasticon (vocabulary), described as "a wonderful production."

Περὶ τόνων (On Accents), an epitome of the major work of Herodian on general prosody in twenty books, was wrongly attributed to Arcadius; it is probably the work of Theodosius or a grammarian named Aristodemus. Though meager and carelessly assembled, it preserves the order of the original and so affords a foundation for its reconstruction.
