= Cornelianus =

Sulpicius Cornelianus (fl. c. 170) was a Roman rhetorician. He lived in the reign of the Roman Emperors Marcus Aurelius and Lucius Verus. This puts him in the late 2nd century AD (Aurelius and Verus reigned from 161 to 180). Cornelianus acted as secretary (ab epistulis Graecis) to Marcus Aurelius.

The grammarian Phrynichus Arabius speaks of Cornelianus with high praise; Phrynichus dedicated his Ecloga to him, and describes him as worthy of the age of the great orator Demosthenes.

Fronto is our source for the fact that Cornelianus was named Sulpicius.

It has been argued that Cornelianus is the author of a surviving treatise in Greek entitled Philetaerus (φιλέταιρος), which had previously been attributed to the great 2nd century grammarian Herodian. Herodian, too, was on good terms with Marcus Aurelius.
