= Aelius Herodianus =

2nd-century Roman-Egyptian grammarian and writer

Aelius Herodianus (Ancient Greek: Αἴλιος Ἡρωδιανός) or Herodian (fl. 2nd century CE) was one of the most celebrated grammarians of Greco-Roman antiquity. He is usually known as Herodian except when there is a danger of confusion with the historian also named Herodian.

Herodian was the son of Apollonius Dyscolus and was born in Alexandria. From there he seems to have moved to Rome, where he gained the favour of the emperor Marcus Aurelius, to whom he dedicated a work on prosody.

== Works ==
Herodian was held in very high esteem by subsequent grammarians; Priscian describes him as maximus auctor artis grammaticae ("the greatest creator of grammatical art"). He wrote many works, but they are mostly fragmentary and it is very difficult to compile an accurate list of them. In numerous instances it is impossible to tell whether the titles given by writers who quote from his works are distinct treatises, or only portions of larger works. In addition, there are ongoing debates over which works were written by him and which were not. Some works by lesser-known figures are known to have been reattributed to Herodian, presumably in order to increase the prestige of the works.

In total some fifty titles are known in connection with Herodian's name. The main works attached to his name (both rightly and wrongly) are as follows (the most usual way of citing each title is highlighted in bold):

- On peculiar style (περὶ μονήρους λέξεως). Probably the only complete work of Herodian's to have survived.
- Categories (ἐπιμερισμοί, Partitiones). Devoted to explanations of difficult words found in Homer; many important quotations from the Partitiones are found in the scholia on Homer.
- General prosody (ἡ καθ' ὅλου προσῳδία, or καθολικὴ προσῳδία, or μεγάλη προσῳδία; De prosodia catholica), in twenty books. Herodian dedicated this work to Marcus Aurelius. It covered prosody and etymology. Two epitomes and an index survive. It is possible that several other titles known to us were in fact parts of the Prosody: namely the Homeric prosody (Ὁμηρικὴ προσῳδία); Attic prosody (Ἀττικὴ προσῳδία); and Anomalous prosody (ἀνώμαλος προσῳδία). A work entitled On accents (περὶ τόνων), attributed to Arcadius of Antioch but compiled by a later grammarian, Theodosius of Byzantium, seems to be an extract from Herodian's Prosody.
- On figures (περὶ σχημάτων, De figuris). This work is known to be spurious, i.e. it is transmitted under Herodian's name but was not written by him. The author is referred to as "pseudo-Herodian".
- Philetaerus (φιλέταιρος). This work is also known to be spurious; it has been suggested that it was in fact by Cornelianus.

== Editions ==
- General edition. August Lentz and Arthur Ludwich 1879 [1867-70], Herodiani Technici reliquiae, reprint (Hildesheim, orig. Lentz); cited by volume and page number.
- Scholia on the Iliad. Erbse, H. 1969–1988, Scholia Graeca in Homeri Iliadem, 7 vols. (Berlin).
- De figuris (spurious). Kerstin Hajdú 1998, Ps.-Herodian, De figuris: Überlieferungsgeschichte und kritische Ausgabe (Berlin, New York). ISBN 3-11-014836-6

Earlier publications:

- Partitiones. Boissonade, J.F. 1963 [1819], Herodiani Partitiones, reprint (Amsterdam).
- De prosodia catholica. August Lentz 1965 [1867], Grammatici Graeci vol. 3.1, reprint (Hildesheim).
- Epitome of De pros. cath. Moritz Schmidt 1983 [1860], Epitome tes katholikes prosodias, reprint (Hildesheim).
- Works reconstructed from Iliad scholia. Lehrs, K. 1857 [1848], Herodiani scripta tria emendatiora, 2nd ed. (Berlin).
- Philetaerus (spurious). Johann Pierson et al. 1969 [1830-31], Moeridis Atticistae Lexicon Atticum, reprint (Hildesheim); Philetaerus ed. Georg Aenotheus Koch.

== See also ==
- Homeric scholarship – Study of any Homeric topic, especially the Iliad and Odyssey
- Venetus A – 10th-century manuscript
