= Psilosis =

Loss of the /h/ sound from ancient Greek

Psilosis (/saɪˈloʊsɪs/) is the sound change in which the Greek language lost its consonant sound /h/ during antiquity. The term comes from the Greek ψίλωσις psílōsis ("smoothing, thinning out") and is related to the Greek term for smooth breathing (ψιλή psilḗ), the sign for the absence of initial /h/ in a word. Dialects that have lost /h/ are called psilotic.

The linguistic phenomenon is comparable to that of h-dropping in dialects of Modern English and to the development by which /h/ was lost in late Latin.

== History ==
The loss of /h/ happened at different times for various dialects of Greek. The eastern Ionic dialects, the Aeolic dialect of Lesbos, as well as the Doric dialects of Crete and Elis, were already psilotic at the beginning of their written record. In Attic, there was widespread variation in popular speech during the classical period, but the formal standard language retained /h/. This variation continued into the Hellenistic Koine.

=== Rough and smooth breathing signs ===
Alexandrine grammarians codified Greek orthography during the 2nd and 1st centuries BC and introduced the signs for the rough ( ῾ ) and smooth ( ᾿ ) breathings to make the distinction between words with and without initial /h/. However, the grammarians were writing at a time when this distinction was no longer natively mastered by many speakers. By the late Roman and early Byzantine period, /h/ had been lost in all forms of the language.

== Orthography ==
=== Eta and heta ===
The loss of the /h/ is reflected in the development of the Greek alphabet by the change in the function of the letter eta (Η), which first served as the sign of /h/ ("heta") but then, in the psilotic dialects, was reused as the sign of the long vowel /ɛː/.

=== Rough and smooth breathing ===
In the polytonic orthography that started in the Hellenistic period of Ancient Greek, the original /h/ sound, where it used to occur, is represented by a diacritic ( ῾ ), called the rough breathing or spiritus asper. This sign is also conventionally used in analogy to the Attic usage when rendering texts from the Ionic dialect, which was already psilotic by the time at which the texts were written. However, for Aeolic texts, the convention is to mark all words as nonaspirated.

== See also ==
- Ancient Greek phonology
