= Carpaea =

Form of Dance

Carpaea or Karpaea (Ancient Greek: Καρπαία and Κάρπεα) among the Aenianians, Magnesians, and Macedonians was a kind of mimic military dance, performed by two persons; the one acting as a laborer, the other as a robber. It is described by Xenophon in his Anabasis (6.1.5 - 6.1.10):

The manner of the dance was this: a man is sowing and driving a yoke of oxen, his arms laid at one side, and he turns about frequently as one in fear; a robber approaches; as soon as the sower sees him coming, he snatches up his arms, goes to meet him, and fights with him to save his oxen. The two men do all this in rhythm to the music of the flute. Finally, the robber binds the man and drives off the oxen; or sometimes the master of the oxen binds the robber, and then he yokes him alongside the oxen, his hands tied behind him, and drives off.
