= Ionic Greek =

Ancient Greek dialect

- Iωνική διάλεκτος
- Region: Ionia, Euboea, Cyclades, Chios, Samos and colonies of the previous regions in Black Sea, Marmara Sea, Thrace, Magna Graecia, Massalia
- Ethnicity: Ionians
- Era: c. 1000–300 BC
- Language family: Indo-European: Hellenic; Greek; Attic–Ionic; Ionic Greek
- Early form: Proto-Greek
- Writing system: Greek alphabet

Language codes
- ISO 639-3: –
- Glottolog: ioni1244
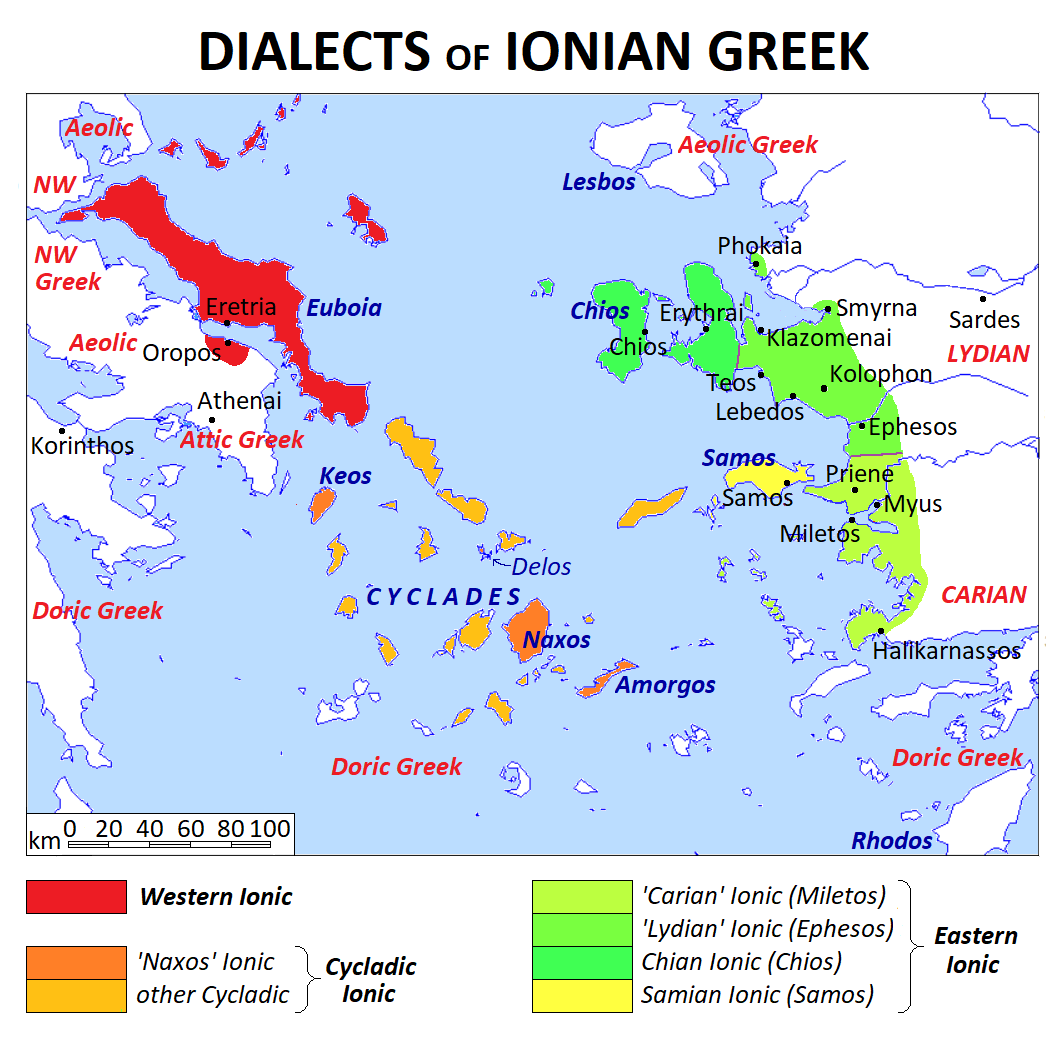
- Map of the Ionian Greek dialects

Ionic Greek or Ionian (Ancient Greek: Ἰωνική, romanized: Iōnikḗ) was a subdialect of the Eastern or Attic–Ionic dialect group of Ancient Greek. On the basis of inscriptions, three subdialects of Ionic may be discerned. The Ionic group traditionally comprises three dialectal varieties that were spoken in Euboea (West Ionic), the northern Cyclades (Central Ionic), and from c. 1000 BC onward in Asiatic Ionia (East Ionic), where Ionian colonists from Athens founded their cities. Ionic was the base of several literary language forms of the Archaic and Classical periods, both in poetry and prose. The works of Homer and Hesiod are among the most popular poetic works that were written in a literary form of the Ionic dialect, known as Epic or Homeric Greek. The oldest Greek prose, including that of Heraclitus, Herodotus, Democritus, and Hippocrates, was also written in Ionic. By the end of the 5th century BC, Ionic was supplanted by Attic, which had become the dominant dialect of the Greek world.

== History ==
The Ionic dialect appears to have originally spread from the Greek mainland across the Aegean around the 11th century BC, during the early Greek Dark Ages. According to tradition, the ancestors of Ionians first set out from Athens, in a series of migrations, to establish their colonies on the coast of Asia Minor and the islands of the Cyclades, around the beginning of the Protogeometric period (1075/1050 BC). Between the 11th and 9th century BC, the Ionians continued to spread around those areas. The linguistic affinity of Attic and Ionic is evident in several unique features, like the early loss of /w/, or the merger of /ā/ and /ē/, as seen in both dialects.

By the end of Archaic Greece and early Classical Greece in the 5th century BC, the central west coast of Asia Minor, along with the islands of Chios and Samos, formed the heartland of Ionia proper. The Ionic dialect was also spoken on islands across the central Aegean and on the large island of Euboea north of Athens. The dialect was soon spread by Ionian colonization to areas in the northern Aegean, the Black Sea, and the western Mediterranean, including Magna Graecia in Sicily and Italy.

The Ionic dialect is generally divided into two major time periods, Old Ionic (or Old Ionian) and New Ionic (or New Ionian). The transition between the two is not clearly defined, but 600 BC is a good approximation.

The works of Homer (The Iliad, The Odyssey, and the Homeric Hymns) and of Hesiod were written in a literary dialect called Homeric Greek or Epic Greek, which largely comprises Old Ionic, but with some admixture from the neighboring Aeolic dialect to the north, as well as with some Mycenaean elements as a result of a long pre-Homeric epic tradition. This Epic Ionic was used in all later hexametric and elegiac poetry, not only by Ionians, but also by foreigners such as the Boeotian Hesiod. Ionic would become the conventional dialect used for specific poetical and literary genres. Ιt was used by many authors, regardless of their origin; like the Dorian Tyrtaeus, composing elegies in a form of Ionic. This ability of poets to switch between dialects would eventually temper regional differences, while contributing to the awareness of the Greekness that all dialects had in common. The poet Archilochus wrote in late Old Ionic.

The most famous New Ionic authors are Anacreon, Theognis, Herodotus, Hippocrates, and, in Roman times, Aretaeus, Arrian, and the Lucianic or Pseudo-Lucianic On the Syrian Goddess.

Ionic acquired prestige among Greek speakers because of its association with the language used by both Homer and Herodotus and the close linguistic relationship with the Attic dialect as spoken in Athens. This was further enhanced by the writing reform implemented in Athens in 403 BC, whereby the old Attic alphabet was replaced by the Ionic alphabet, as used by the city of Miletus. This alphabet eventually became the standard Greek alphabet, its use becoming uniform during the Koine era. It was also the alphabet used in the Christian Gospels and the book of Acts.

== Ionic subdialects ==
1. Western Ionic, the dialect of Euboea and parts of Attica, like Oropos;

2. Central or Cycladic Ionic, the dialect of the Cycladic Islands;

3. Eastern Ionic, the dialect of Samos, Chios, and the west coast of Asia Minor.

Eastern Ionic stands apart from both other dialects because it lost at a very early time the /h/ sound (psilosis) (Herodotos should therefore properly be called Erodotos). The /w/ sound (digamma) is also completely absent from Eastern Ionic, but was sometimes retained in Western and Cycladic Ionic. Also pronouns that begin with /hop-/ in Western and Cycladic Ionic (ὅπου where, ὅπως how), begin with ok- (conventionally written hok-) in Eastern Ionic (ὅκου/ὄκου, ὅκως/ὄκως).

Western Ionic differs from Cycladic and Eastern Ionic by the sounds -tt- and -rr- where the other two have -ss- and -rs- (τέτταρες vs. τέσσαρες, four; θάρρος vs. θάρσος, bravery). Western Ionic also stands apart by using the form ξένος (xenos, foreigner, guest), where the other two use ξεῖνος (xeinos).

Cycladic Ionic may be further subdivided: Keos, Naxos, and Amorgos retained a difference between two /æ/ sounds, namely original /æ/ (written as Ε), and /æ/ evolved from /ā/ (written as Η); for example ΜΗΤΕΡ = μήτηρ < μάτηρ, mother. On the other Cycladic Islands this distinction was not made, Η and Ε were used there interchangeably.

Within Eastern Ionic, Herodotus recognized four subgroups (Histories, I.142), three of them apparently influenced by a neighbouring language:

a. The dialect of Miletus, Myus, and Priene, and their colonies, influenced by Carian;

b. The Ionic of Ephesos, Kolophon, Lebedos, Teos, Klazomenai, and Phokaia, and their colonies, influenced by Lydian;

c. The dialect of Chios and Erythrai and their colonies, influenced by Aeolic Greek;

d. The dialect of Samos and its colonies.

Differences between these four groups are not clearly visible from inscriptions, probably because inscriptions were usually ordered by a high social group that everywhere spoke the same kind of "civilized Ionic". However, local speech by the "man in the street" must have shown differences. An inkling of this may be witnessed in the language of Ephesian "beggar poet" Hipponax, who often used local slang (νικύρτας, σάβαυνις: terms of abuse; χλούνης, thief; κασωρικός, whorish) and Lydian loanwords (πάλμυς, king).

== Phonology ==
=== Vowels ===
Proto-Greek ā > Ionic ē; in Doric, Aeolic, ā remains; in Attic, ā after e, i, r, but ē elsewhere.

- Attic νεᾱνίᾱς neāníās, Ionic νεηνίης neēníēs "young man"
- original and Doric ἁ (ᾱ) hā > Attic-Ionic ἡ hē "the" (feminine nominative singular)
- original and Doric μᾱ́τηρ mātēr > Attic-Ionic μήτηρ mḗtēr "mother"

Proto-Greek e, o > East/Central Ionic ei, ou: (Note: Among Greek dialects, Ionic was the fondest of long vowels and was thus considered especially suited to solo singing; the more austere, broad-sounding Doric was preferred in choral singing.) compensatory lengthening after loss of w in the sequences enw-, erw-, onw-, orw-. In Attic and West Ionic, e, o are not lengthened.

- Proto-Greek *kórwā > Attic κόρη kórē, East Ionic κούρη koúrē "girl"
- *órwos > ὄρος óros, οὖρος oúros "mountain"
- *ksénwos > ξένος xénos, ξεῖνος xeĩnos "guest, stranger"

East Ionic generally removes initial aspiration (Proto-Greek hV- > Ionic V-).

- Proto-Greek *hāwélios > Attic hēlios, Homeric (early East Ionic) ēélios "sun"

Ionic contracts less often than Attic.

- Ionic γένεα génea, Attic γένη génē "family" (neuter nominative plural)

=== Consonants ===
Proto-Greek *kʷ before o > Attic, West/Central Ionic p, some East Ionic k.

- Proto-Greek *hókʷōs > East Ionic ὅκως hókōs, Attic ὅπως hópōs "in whatever way, in which way"

Proto-Greek *ťť > East/Central Ionic ss, West Ionic, Attic tt. This feature of East and Central Ionic made it into Koine Greek.

- Proto-Greek *táťťō > Ionic τάσσω tássō, Attic τάττω táttō "I arrange"

== Glossary ==
- ἄβδης ábdês scourge ( Hipponax .98)
- ἄεθλον áethlon (Attic ἆθλον athlon prize)
- ἀειναῦται aeinaûtai archontes in Miletus and Chalcis (aeí always + naûtai sailors)
- ἀλγείη algeíē illness (Cf.Attic ἀλγηδών algēdṓn pain) Algophobia
- ἄμπωτις ámpōtis ebb, being sucked back, i.e. of sea (Attic anápōtis, verb anapínō) (Koine, Modern Greek ampotis)
- ἄνου anou (Attic ἄνω ánō, up)
- Απατούρια Apatoúria Pan-ionic festival ( see also Panionium )
- ἀππαλλάζειν appallázein (Attic ἐκκλησιάζειν ekklesiázein gather together, decide) (Doric ἀπελλαζειν apellazein)
- ἀχάντιον achántion (Attic ἀκάνθιον akánthion small thorn acanthus)
- βάθρακοι báthrakoi (Attic βάτραχοι bátrachoi, frogs) in Pontus βαβακοι babakoi
- βροῦκος broûkos species of locust (Attic akrís) (Cypriots call the green locust βρούκα broúka)
- βυσσός byssós (Attic βυθός bythós depth, bottom, chaos)
- γάννος gánnos Ephesian (Attic huaina (glanos Aristotle.HA594a31.) (Phrygian and Tsakonian ganos
- εἴδη eídē (Attic ὕλη hýle forest) (Aeolic Greek εἴδη eídē also) (Greek Eidos)
- ἐνθαῦτα enthaûta here (ἐντοῦθα entoutha also) (Attic ἐνταῦθα entaûtha) (Elean ἐνταῦτα entaûta)
- ἐργύλος ergýlos (Attic ἐργάτηςergátēs worker)
- ἑστιᾶχος hestiâchos ionic epithet for Zeus, related to Hestia (οἰκουρός oikourós, housekeeper, οἰκῶναξ oikônax)
- ἠγός ēgós (Attic εὐδαίμων eudaímon happy) (Hesychius s.v. εὐηγεσίη) (τ 114)
- ἠέλιος êélios (Attic hḗlios sun) (Cretan abelios)
- Ἰαστί Iastí, "the ionic way" ( Ἰάονες, Iáones, Ionians; Ἰάς, Iás, old name of Attica, Strabo IX, 1.5 )
- ἴδη ídē forested mountain (Attic δρυμῶν ὄρος drymôn óros) (Herodotus 4,109,2) (Mount Ida)
- ἰητρός iētrós, iētēr (Attic ιἀτρος, ιἀτηρ iatrós, iatēr doctor)
- ἴκκος íkkos (Attic ἵππος híppos, horse) (Mycenaean i-qo )
- κάρη kárē head (Common κάρα kára) (Poetic κράς kras)
- κιθών kithṓn (Attic χιτών chitṓn)
- κοεῖν koeîn (Attic νοεῖν noeîn to think) noesis
- κοῖος koîos (Attic ποῖος poîos who?)
- κύθρη kýthrē (Attic χύτρα chýtra cooking pot)
- μύτταξ mýttax (Attic πώγων pṓgōn beard)
- Ξουθίδαι Xouthidai Ionians from Xuthus
- ὀδμή odmḗ (Attic ὀσμή osmḗ scent, smell)
- πηλός pēlós thick wine, lees (Attic πηλός pelós mud, silt) (proverbial phrase mê dein ton Oinea Pêlea poiein, don't make wine into lees, Ath.9.383c, cf. Demetr.Eloc.171)
- ῥηχίη rhêchíê flood-tide, loanword to Attic as ῥαχία rhachía (Homeric, Koine, Modern Greek πλημμυρίς plêmmurís -ída)
- σαβακός sabakís (Attic σαθρός sathrís decayed) Chian
- σάρμοι sármoi lupins (Attic θέρμοιthermoi} Carystian
- σκορπίζω skorpízô scatter, disperse (probably from skorpios scorpion and an obsolete verb skerpô, penetrate)
- ταῦροι taûroi (Attic ταυροι tauroi bulls) (Ephesian word, the youths who acted as cupbearers at the local festival of Poseidon)
- φοινικήια phoinikḗia grámmata Lydians and Ionians called so the letters
- χλοσσός chlossós (Attic ἰχθύς ichthús fish)
- ὦ οἰοῖ ô oioî exclamation of discontent ἐπιφώνημα σχετλιαστικὸν παρ' Ἴωσι

== See also ==
- Ionians
- Yona
- Dayuan

== Sources ==
- Christides, Anastasios-Phoivos (2007). A History of Ancient Greek: From the Beginnings to Late Antiquity. UK: Cambridge University Press. ISBN 978-0521833073.
- Giannakis, Georgios K. (2014). Encyclopedia of Ancient Greek Language and Linguistics. Brill. ISBN 9789004225978.
- Miller, D. Gary (2013). Ancient Greek Dialects and Early Authors, Introduction to the Dialect Mixture in Homer, with Notes on Lyric and Herodotus. De Gruyter. ISBN 9781614512950.
- Fisk, Benjamin Franklin (1830). "Ionic". A Grammar of the Greek Language. Hilliard, Gray, Little, and Wilkins.
- Horrocks, Geoffrey (2009). Greek: A History of the Language and its Speakers. John Wiley & Sons. ISBN 978-1444318920.
- Palmer, Leonard Robert (1996). The Greek Language. University of Oklahoma Press. ISBN 0806128445.
- Derks, Ton; Roymans, Nico (2009). Ethnic Constructs in Antiquity, The Role of Power and Tradition. Amsterdam University Press. ISBN 9789089640789.
