= Ludwig Friedländer =

German philologist (1824–1909)

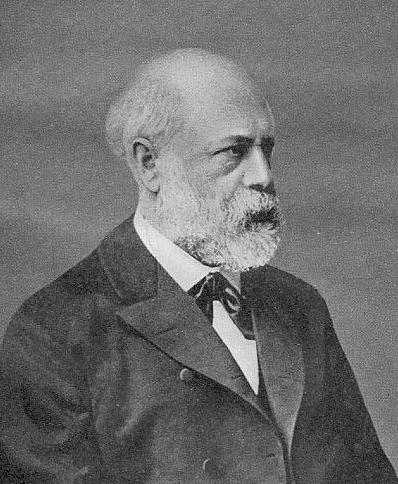
Ludwig Friedländer.

Ludwig Henrich Friedlaender (16 July 1824 – 16 December 1909) was a German philologist. He was one of the preeminent scholars of Ancient Rome of his time and is known for his research on Roman daily life and customs. He was a professor at Albertina and served as its rector 1865/66 and 1874/75. He was also a member of the House of Lords.

He was born in Königsberg, and studied at the universities of his hometown Königsberg, Leipzig, and Berlin from 1841 to 1845. In 1847 he became privat-docent of classical philology at Königsberg, in 1856 assistant professor, and in 1858 professor.

He retired in 1892 to Strasbourg, where he was honorary professor at the university, and died there.

He was a son of the merchant Hirsch Friedländer (1791–1871) and Emma Levia Perlbach (1801–1863), and was raised Jewish. He later converted to Protestantism. In 1856, he married Laura Gutzeit, daughter of an East Prussian estate owner. Their son Paul Friedländer was a noted chemist. Their daughter Charlotte Friedländer was married to the art historian Georg Dehio.

== Literary works ==
His chief work is Darstellungen aus der Sittengeschichte Roms in der Zeit von August bis zum Ausgang der Antonine (3 vols., 1862–71; 6th ed., 1889–90). This work is considered one of the most noteworthy philological productions of the 19th century (translated into French, Italian, Spanish, English, and Hungarian).

Friedländer's other publications include:

- Nicanoris περὶ Ἰλιακῆς στιγμῆς: Reliquiæ Emendatiores (1850);
- Ueber den Kunstsinn der Römer in der Kaiserzeit (1852);
- Aristonici Alexandrini περὶ σημείων Ἰλιάδος: Reliquiæ Emendatiores (1853);
- Die Homerische Kritik von Wolf bis Grote (1853).

He edited and annotated:

- Martial (2 vols., 1886);
- Petronius' Cena Trimalchionis (with translation, 1891);
- Juvenal (1895).
