= Oescus =

Ancient Roman city near Pleven, Bulgaria

Colonia Ulpia Oescensium
- Oescus
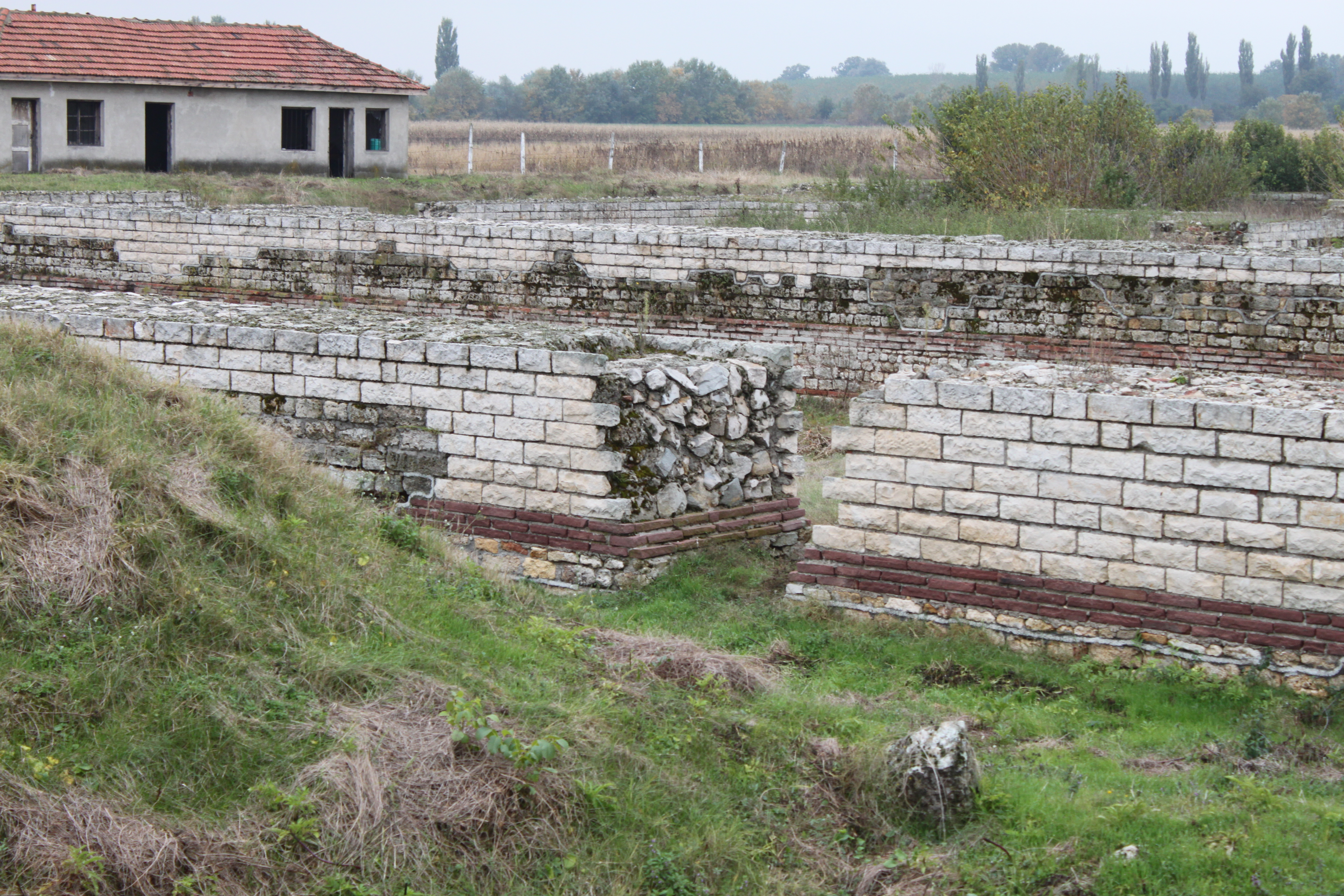
- Section of legionary fortress wall, Oescus

- Location within Bulgaria
- 43°42′N 24°29′E
- Location: Gigen, Gulyantsi Municipality, Pleven Province, Bulgaria

History
- Founded: 102
- Built: Trajan
- Abandoned: 586

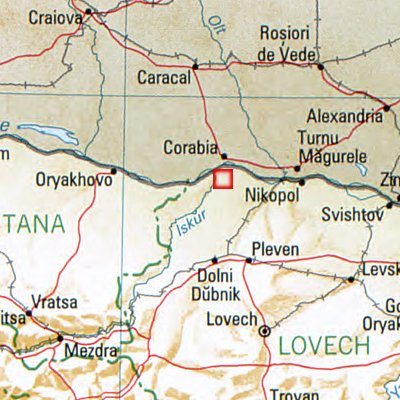
Local map

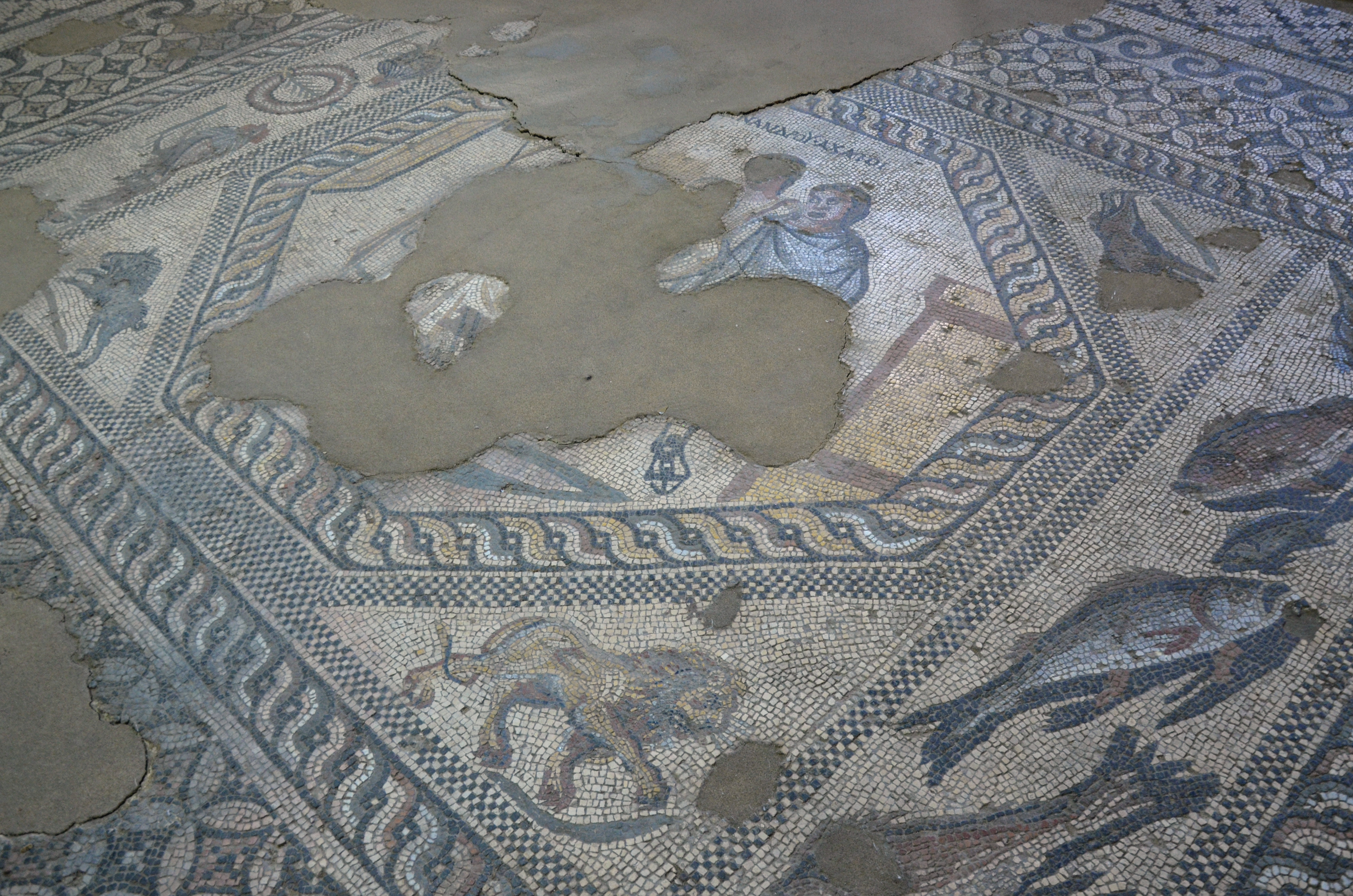
The mosaic "The Achaeans of Menander", found near the Temple of Fortuna in Ulpia Oescus, Pleven Museum

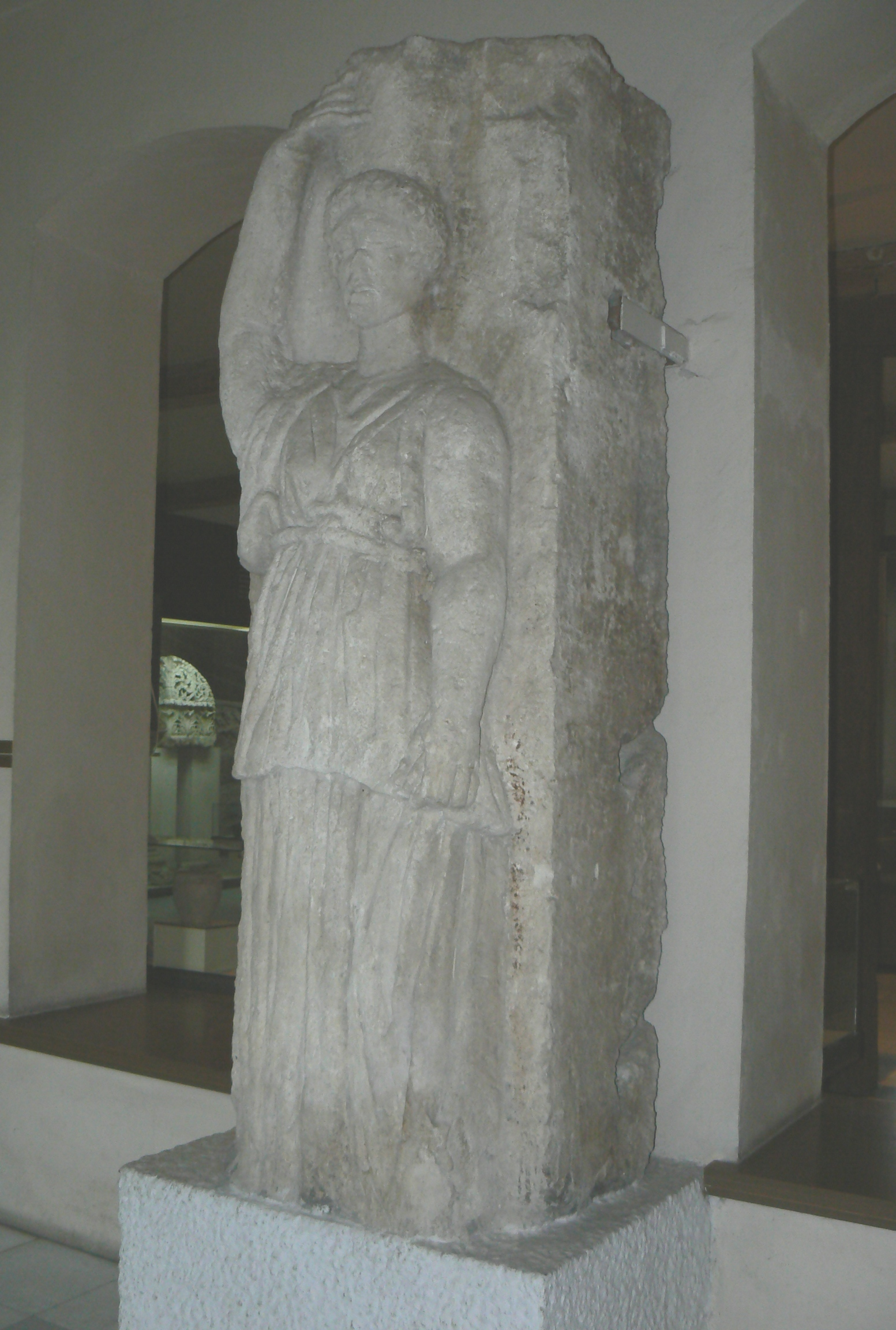
A caryatid from Ulpia Oescus, Pleven history museum

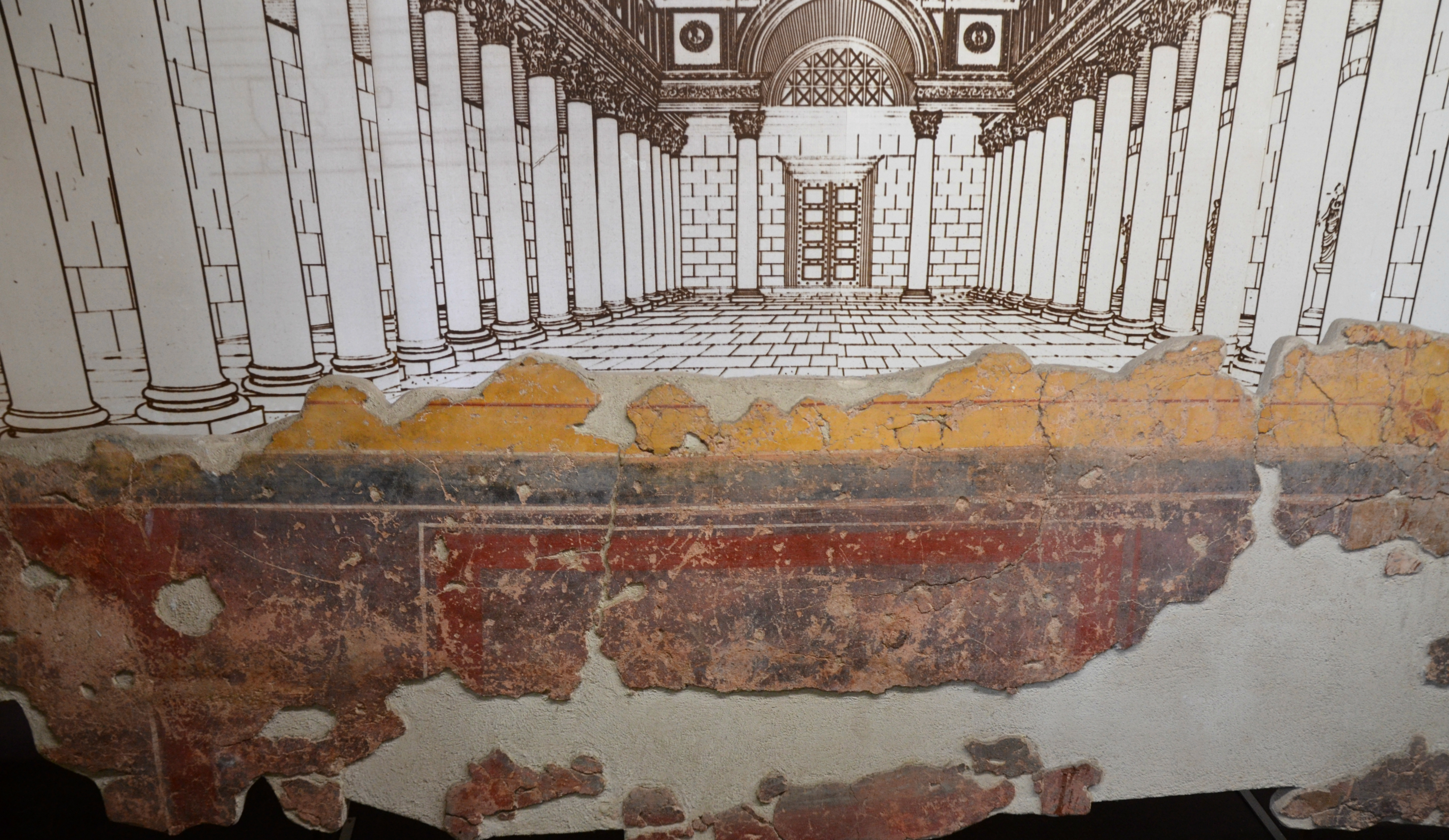
Fragment of fresco from the civic basilica of Ulpia Oescus, Pleven Museum

Oescus, Palatiolon or Palatiolum (Bulgarian: Улпия Ескус, pronounced [oɫˈpiɐ ˈɛskos]) was an important ancient city on the Danube river in Roman Moesia. It later became known as Ulpia Oescus. It lay northwest of the modern Bulgarian city of Pleven, near the village of Gigen.

For a short time it was linked by the longest and most famous stone bridge across the Danube, Constantine's Bridge, with the ancient city of Sucidava (modern-day Corabia, Romania).

The city seems to have at one point reached an area of 280,000 m^{2} and a population of 100,000.

Archaeological excavations have brought to light parts of the ancient city and are continuing.

== Etymology ==
The name of the Roman town comes from the river Oescus (today Iskar). It probably meant "water" in the local Thracian dialect.

== History ==
The Greek geographer Claudius Ptolemy (ca. 90–168 AD) described Ulpia Oescus as a city of the Triballi, an independent ancient tribe which inhabited today's northwestern Bulgaria.

Under Roman rule, Oescus began as an important military base and legionary fortress as part of the Danubian Limes. Together with the adjacent settlement, it developed into a city. It was connected to the rest of the Roman empire by three important roads:

1. linking the Via Egnatia to the Danube: from Heraclea Lyncestis to Ceramiae, Stobi, Astibos, Tranupara, Pautalia, Aelea, Serdica, Oescus.
2. from Philippopolis to Oescus: Philippopolis ‐ Viamata (Voynyagovo‐"Gorni Stenici") – Sub Radice (Hristo Danovo) – Montemno (Beklemeto‐"Karcovija Buk") – Ad Radices (Beli Osăm/Kamen Most) – Sostra (Lomec) – Melta (Loveč) – Doriones – Storgosia (Pleven) – Ad Putea (Riben) – Oescus
3. along the Danube: Singidunum (Belgrade) – Viminacium (Costolac) – Ratiaria – Oescus – Novae (Steklen by Svistov) – Durostorum (Silistra) – mouth of the Danube River.

The Roman Legio V Macedonica (Fifth Macedonian Legion) maintained its permanent military fortress intermittently at this site from 10 to 101 AD. In 62 the legion left to take part in the Nero's Parthian War in Armenia and was later sent to the east to fight in the conclusion of the war. It also fought in the Jewish-Roman War in 66–67. After a short stay in Alexandria in Egypt, this legion returned to Oescus in 71. During its absence, the camp in Oescus was probably occupied by cohors IV Gallorum equitata. When the Danube defences were strengthened a second legion (Legio IV Scythica) was also stationed here until 101 AD.

Between 106 and 112 Trajan granted the city the status of a colonia and it received a new name, Colonia Ulpia Oescensium ("Ulpia" after Trajan's middle name, Ulpius). Veterans of the VI Macedonica and the Legio I Italica Legions may have been settled here as shown by archaeology. The city was built on top of the legionary fortress.

In 167, Oescus received the unique additional privilege of being granted all Roman rights.

In 190–191, the city dedicated a pagan temple to the goddess Fortuna, who was designated as protector of the city. There also existed a temple of the Capitoline Triad (Jupiter, Juno and Minerva).

The city's economy included manufacturing of jewellery, bronze statuettes bronze brooches and other metal objects and vessels, glass, ceramics (terra sigillata, red slip pottery and other), metal and bone articles. It was also home to one of the largest sculpture workshops in the region.

After 271, the Legio V Macedonica returned and built a second fortress, called Oescus II. An aqueduct was built to deliver fresh water from springs 20 km away, and a stone wall was constructed to protect the site from invaders and from the Danube floods.

On 5 July 328 emperor Constantine I personally opened and consecrated the Constantines's Bridge, the biggest and most famous stone bridge on the Danube. The crossing linked Oescus with Sucidava to the north and, measuring 2.5 km long (1.3 km over the river) by 5.7 m wide, was the largest river bridge in ancient times. However, the span was only used for about 27 years; it was destroyed during a barbarian invasion in 355.

In 411, the Huns destroyed Oescus, and in 444 an attempt was made to resettle it as a Hun settlement, named Hunion. Emperor Justinian I rebuilt the city's defensive wall, in an attempt to re-establish Oescus as the stronghold of the Danube defense system, but all the efforts were stopped in late 585 and early 586 by the invasion of the Avars.

=== Middle Ages ===
A Bulgarian village existed on the site during the 10th–14th centuries.

== Archaeology ==
Oescus is one of the biggest and most continuously studied ancient cities of the Lower Danube. Archaeological excavations began at the site in 1904, carried out by Vaclav Dobruski.

Remains of the legionary fortress's defensive wall are still visible and areas to the east-northeast (Pyasutsite and Prez Livada) show signs of the presence of a necropolis from this period, containing epigraphic monuments of veterans.

The walled city has the shape of an irregular pentagon, with an initial area of 18 hectares; after 271 it was extended easterly with a 10 hectare addition.

In 1948, the mosaic known popularly as "The Achaeans" (3rd century AD) was discovered. It is currently on display, along with many other of the site's artifacts, at the Pleven Regional Historical Museum. Other artifacts from the site, such as a statue of the goddess Fortuna, are on view at the National Archaeological Museum in Sofia.

Archaeological surveys of the eastern extension of Oescus II indicate houses from the Principate period, some of which were quite massive and were decorated with mosaics that could be dated to the time of Septimius Severus.

The ruins indicate the wealth of the city in the Antonine and Severan dynasties. There are a main gate, administrative buildings, a civil basilica, three public baths (thermae), wells, a perfectly preserved road, pagan temples, a necropolis, defensive walls, workshops, and a forum. There also exist ruins of Constantines's Bridge, but they can be seen only from the northern bank of the Danube.

Archaeology is continuing at the site. In 2020 the Aula regia, or great hall, was found to have been exquisitely and elaborately decorated with 14 types of rare multicloured marble. Dating from the 4th century, its date and quality indicate that it may have been built for Constantine's visit to officially open the bridge in 328.

== Honours ==
- Oescus Island in Antarctica is named after Oescus.

== Gallery ==
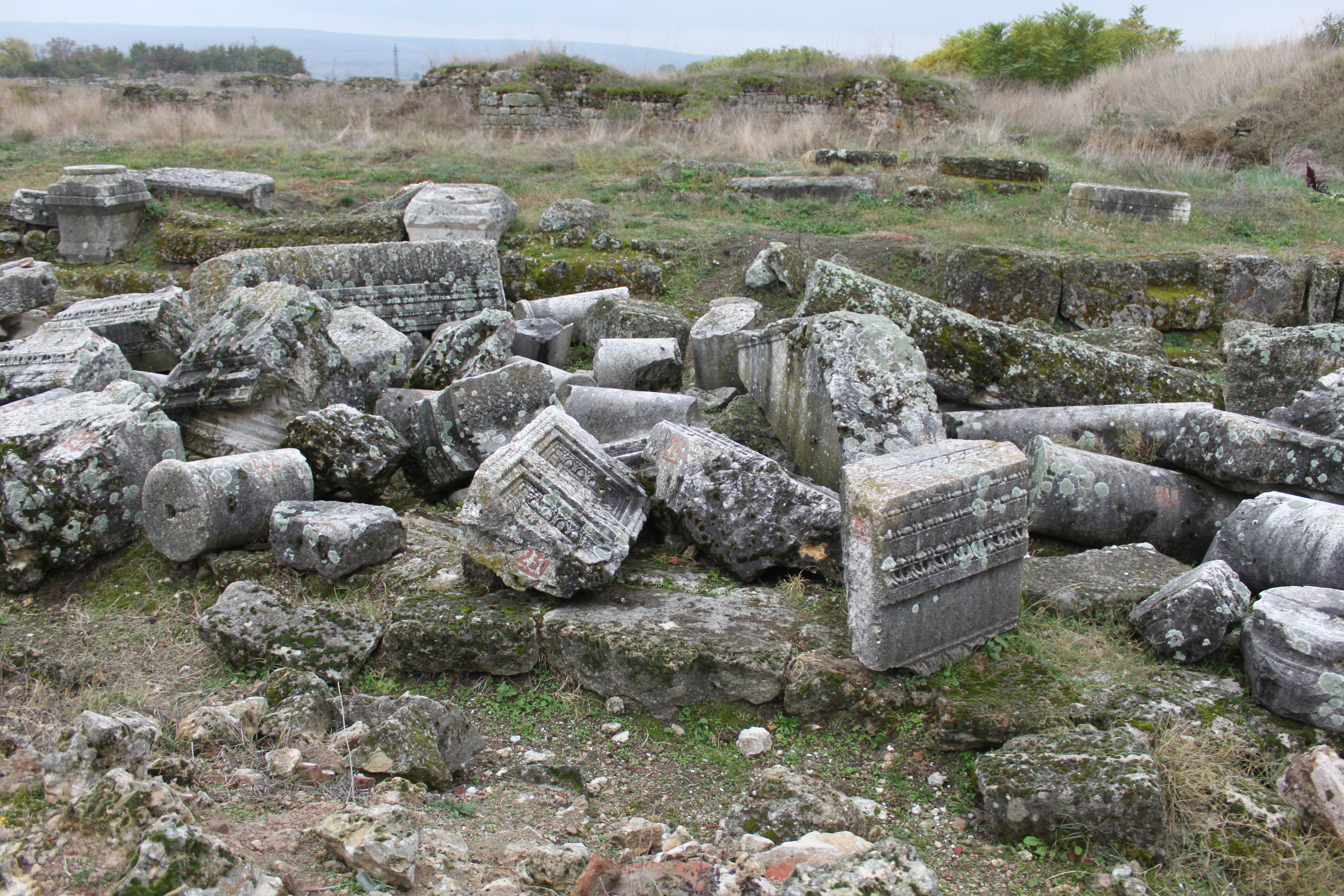

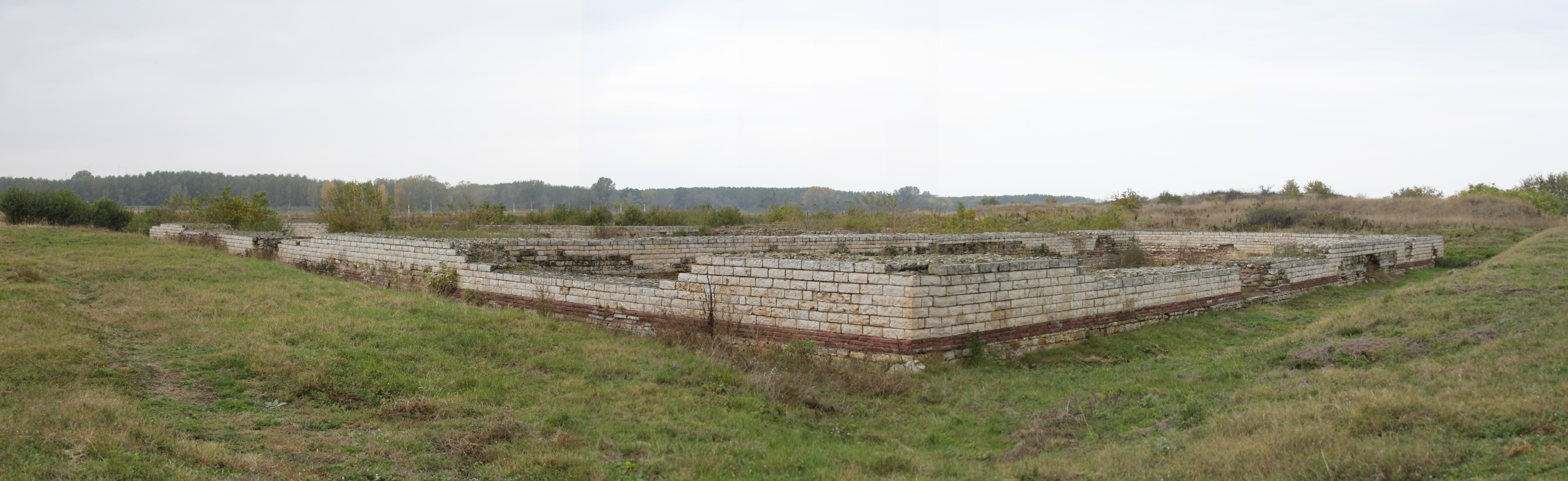

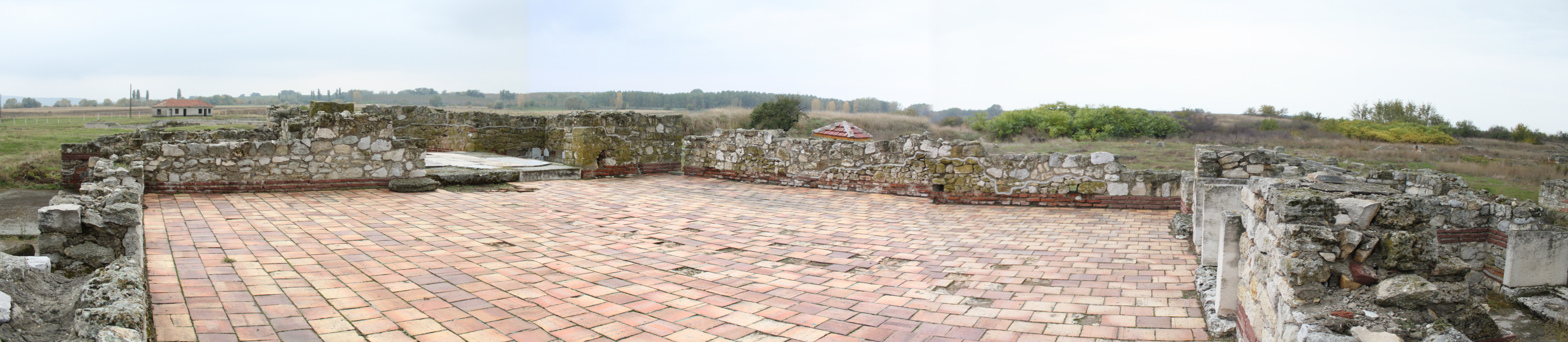

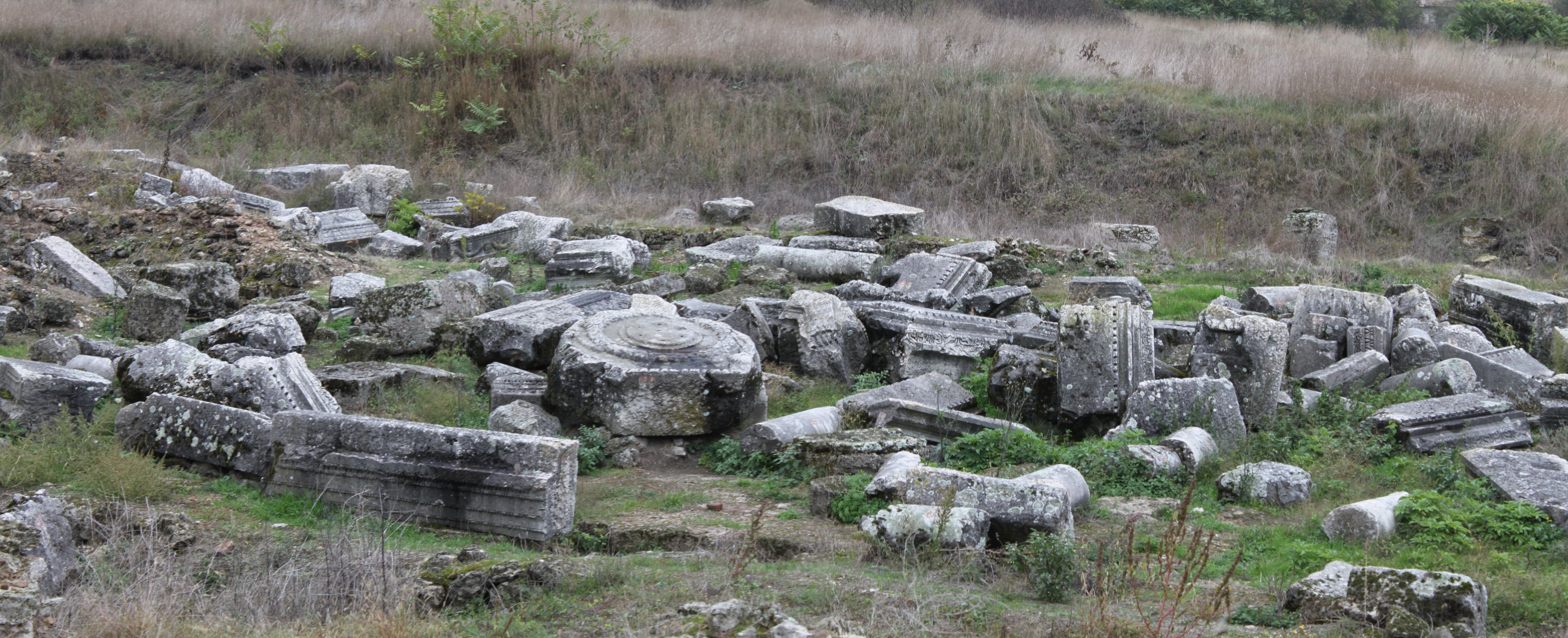

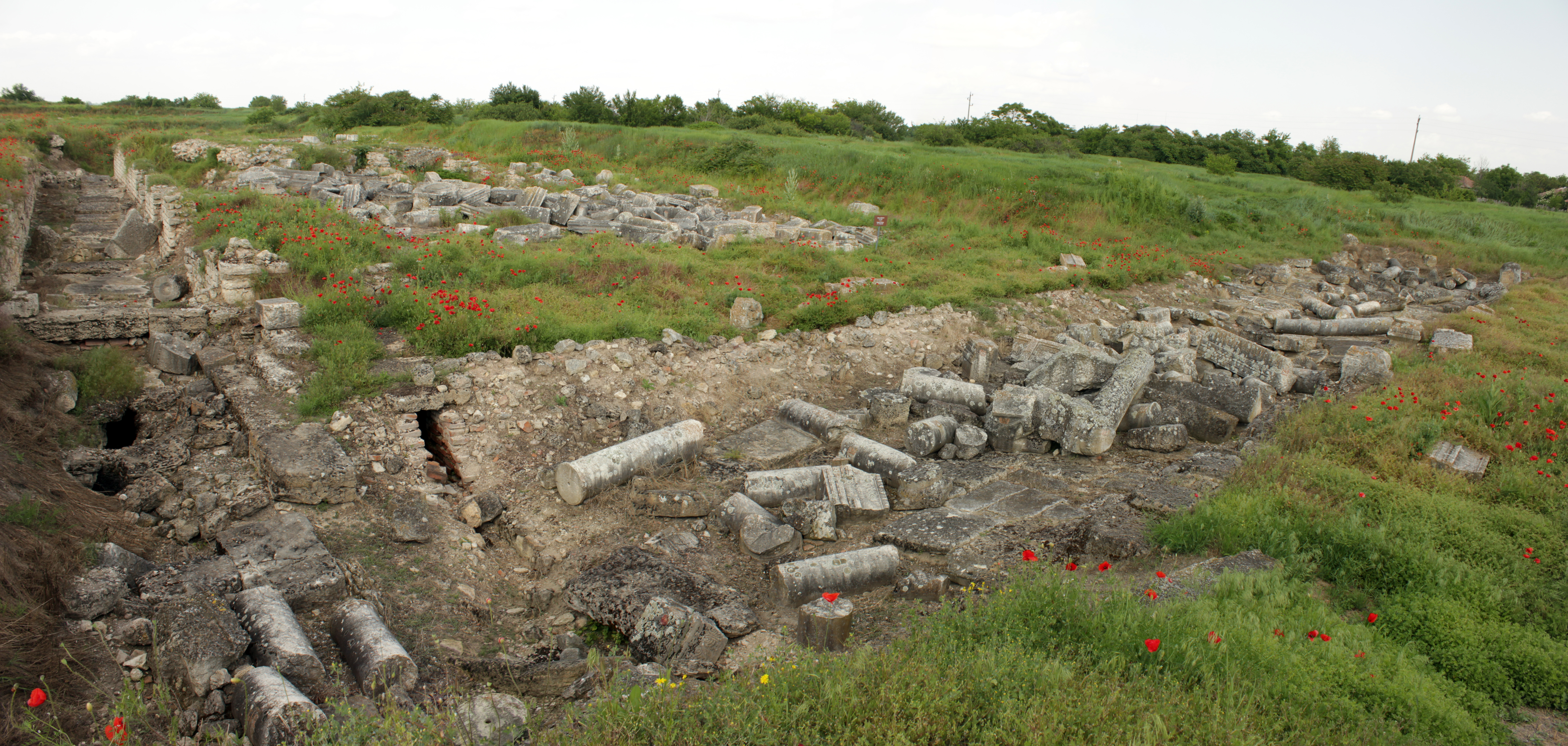

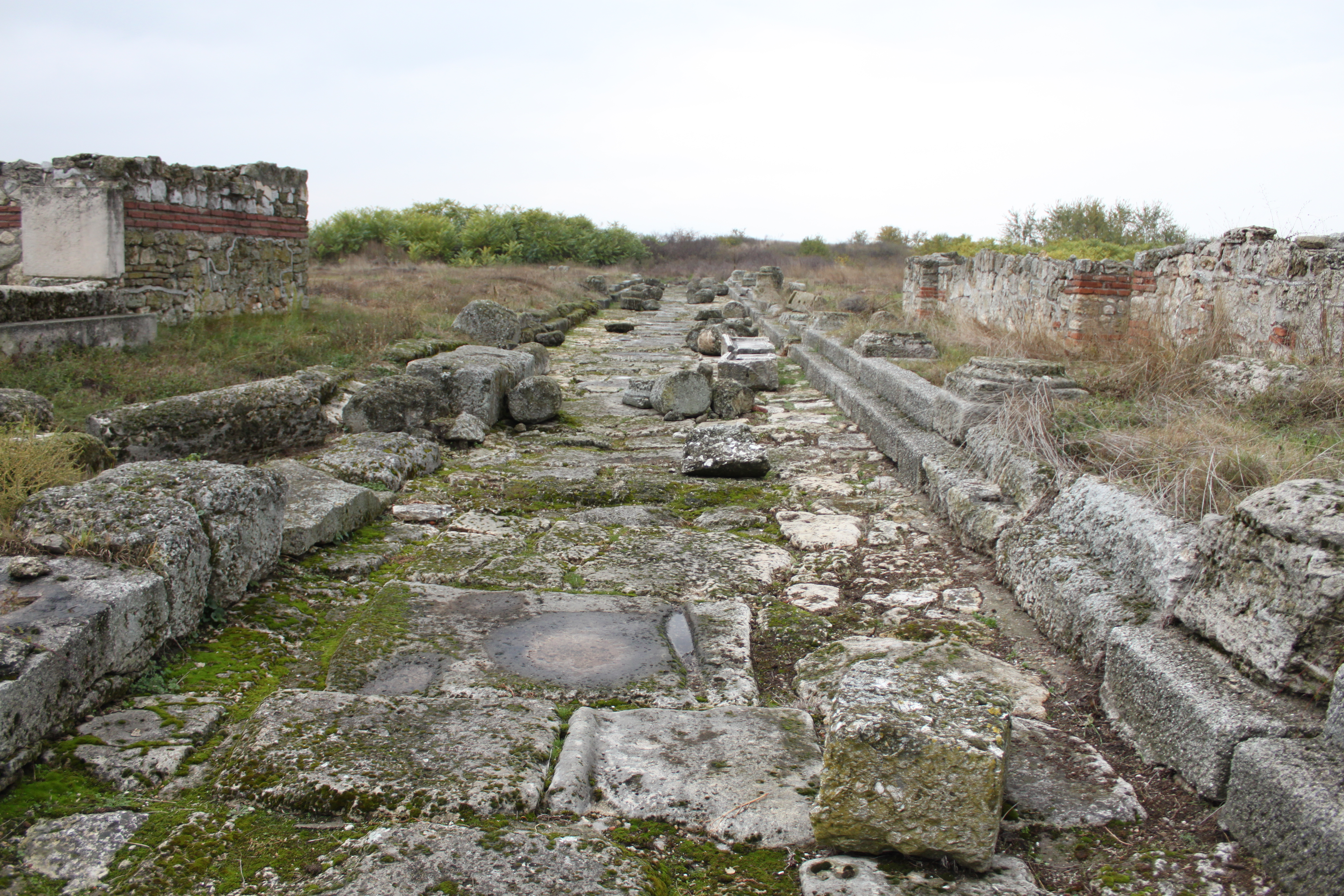

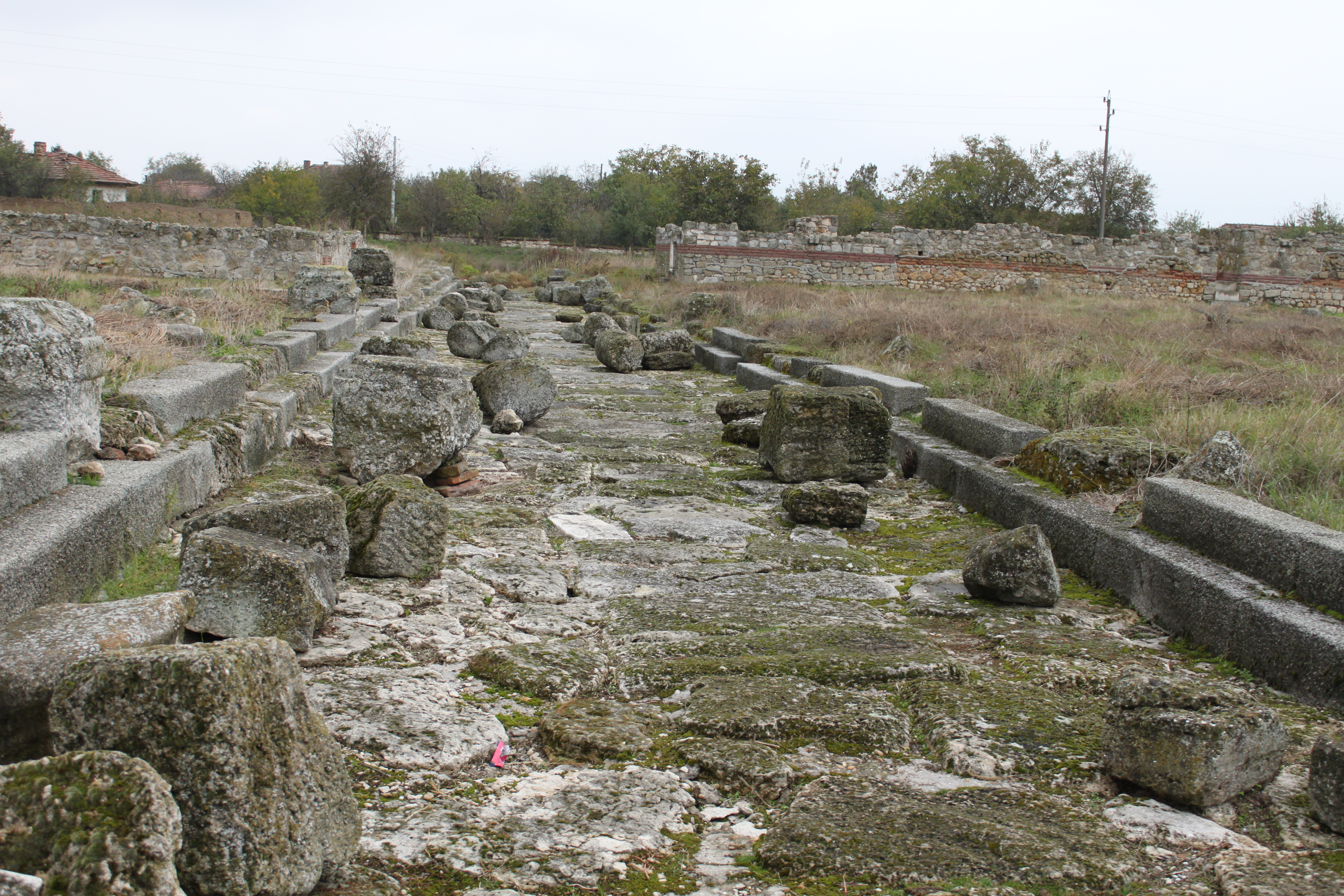

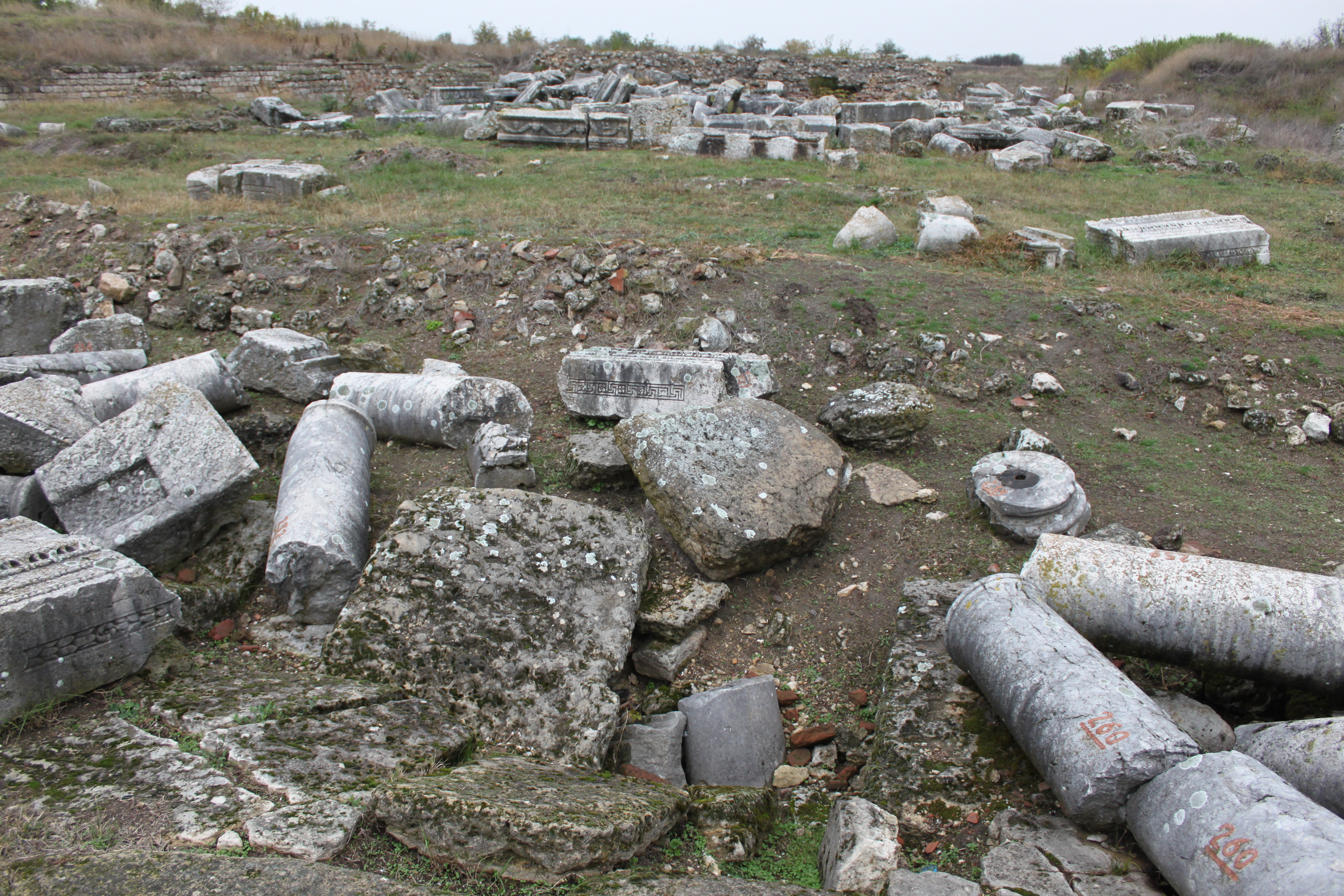

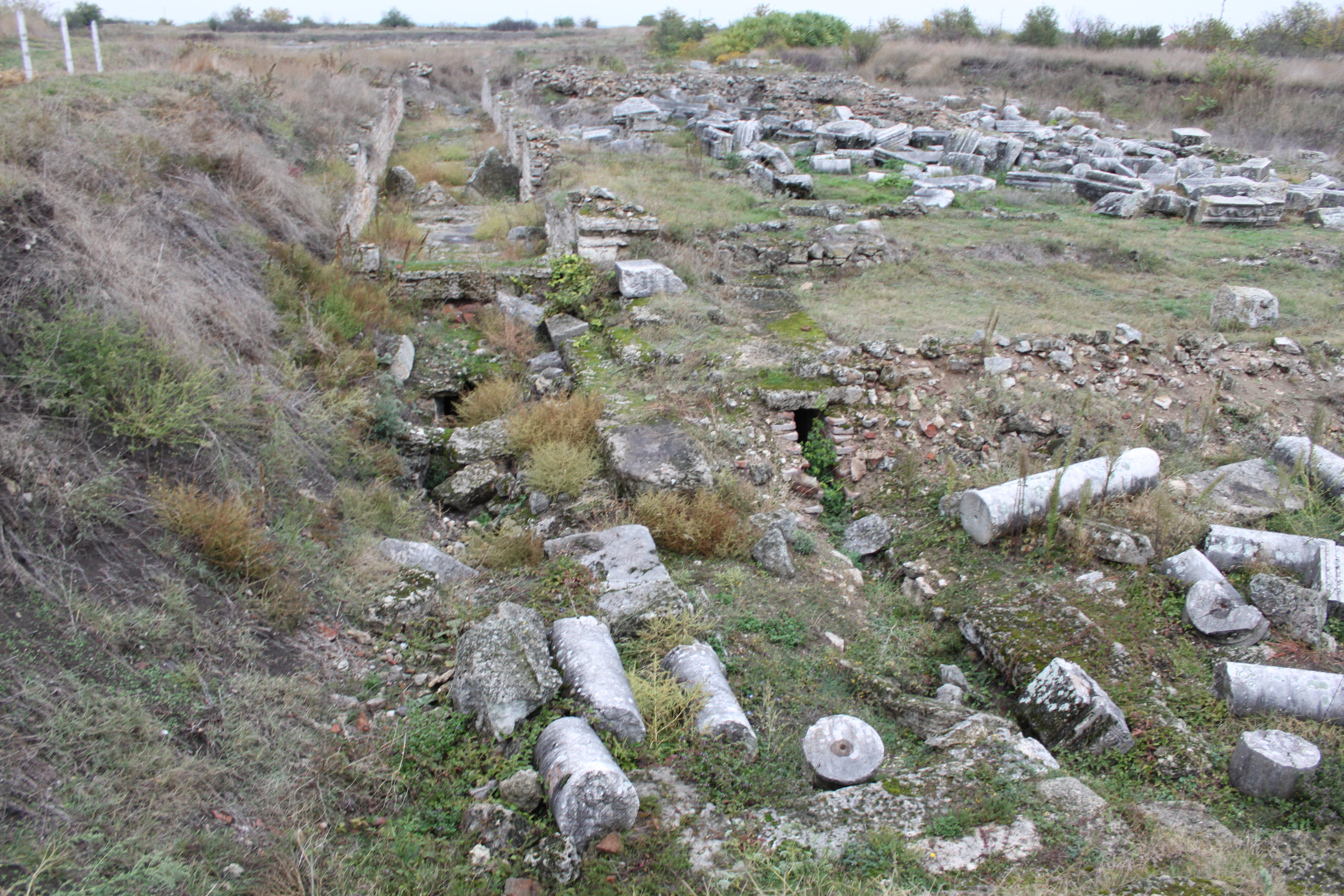

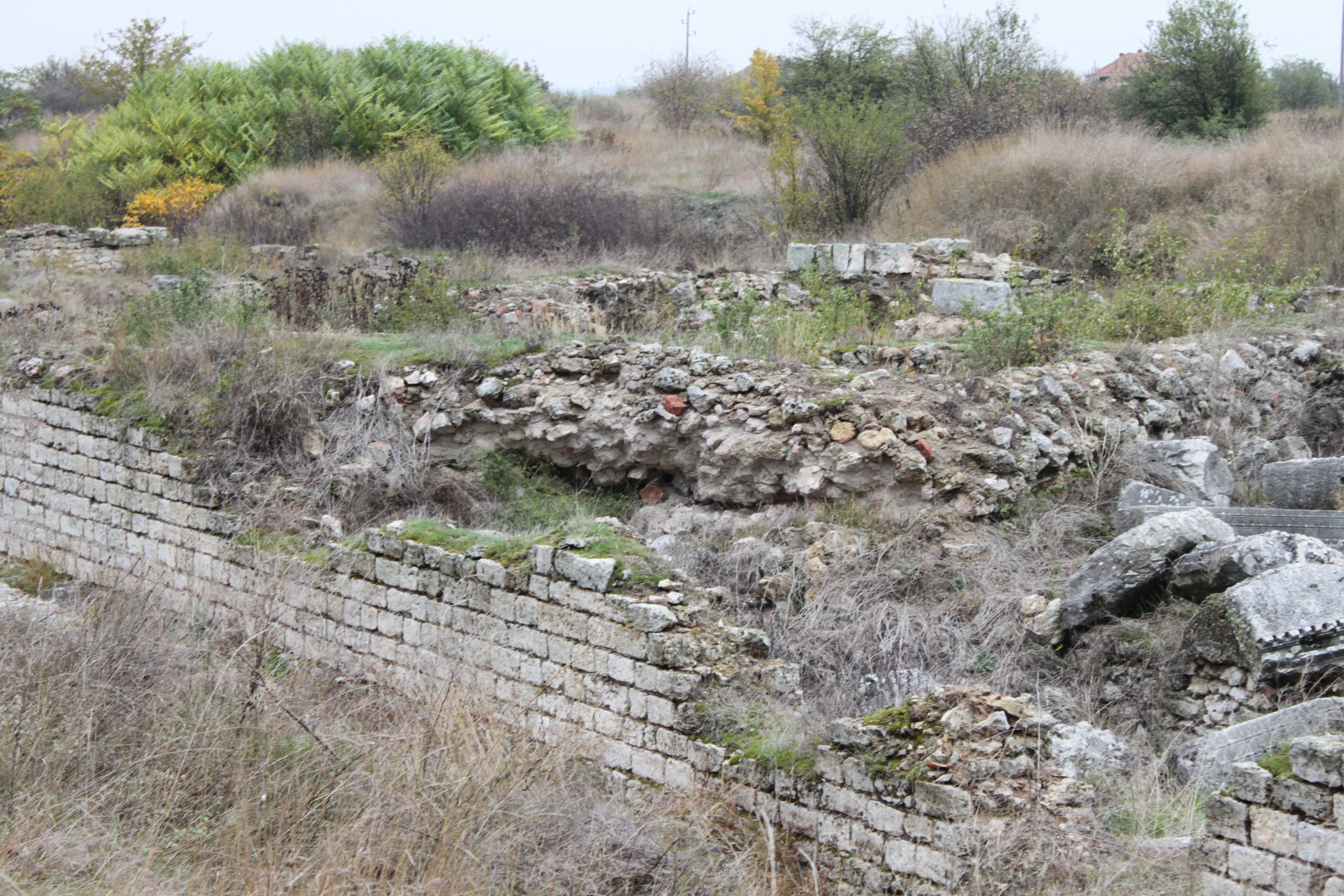

== See also ==
- Dacia
- Dacian davae
- List of ancient cities in Thrace and Dacia
- Moesia
- Roman Dacia
