= Metropolis of Kitros, Katerini and Platamon =

The Metropolis of Kitros, Katerini, and Platamon (Greek: Ιερά Μητρόπολις Κίτρους, Κατερίνης και Πλαταμώνος) is an Eastern Orthodox metropolis of the Church of Constantinople, but is de facto administered (by agreement) for practical reasons as part of the Church of Greece.

The bishopric is centered on the ancient town of Pydna, on the coast of Thessaly although named for the nearby settlements of Kitros and Katerini.

== History ==
The see is ancient and has a tradition of both Orthodox and Roman Catholic bishops.

The Kitros bishopric is mentioned in the Notitia Episcopatuum of Leo VI the Wise (r. 866–912). Its bishop Germanus participated in the Council of Constantinople (879–880). after the Fourth Crusade Kitros became a Catholic diocese, as witnessed by a letter of Pope Innocent III in 1208, to an unnamed bishop of the see. It returned to Orthodox control soon after, when the region was conquered by the Despotate of Epirus.

Today the episcopal residence and two early Christian basilicas dating from the 4th and 6th centuries remain in nearby Pydna. Today there is a resident Orthodox bishop, while the see is also maintained by the Roman Catholic Church as a vacant titular see.

== Known bishops ==
- Germanus participated in the Council of Constantinople (879–880)
- Panaretos, Bishop of Kitros, 996.
- Unnamed Catholic Bishop
- Unnamed Orthodox bishop in 1235
- Anonymous Orthodox bishop of Kitros
- John of Kitros
- Unnamed Bishop forced to flee slaughter of the inhabitants of Kitros in 1612.
- Nikolaos, 1840–1882
- Theocletos.
- Parthenios Vardakas, 1904–1933.
- Konstantinos Koidakis, 1934–1954
- Barnabas (Nikolaos) Tzortzatos, 1954–1985 (in Greek)
- Agathonikos (Fatouros) of Kitros, 1985–2013 (in Greek)
- Georgios Chrysostomou, 2014– (in Greek)

== Cathedral ==
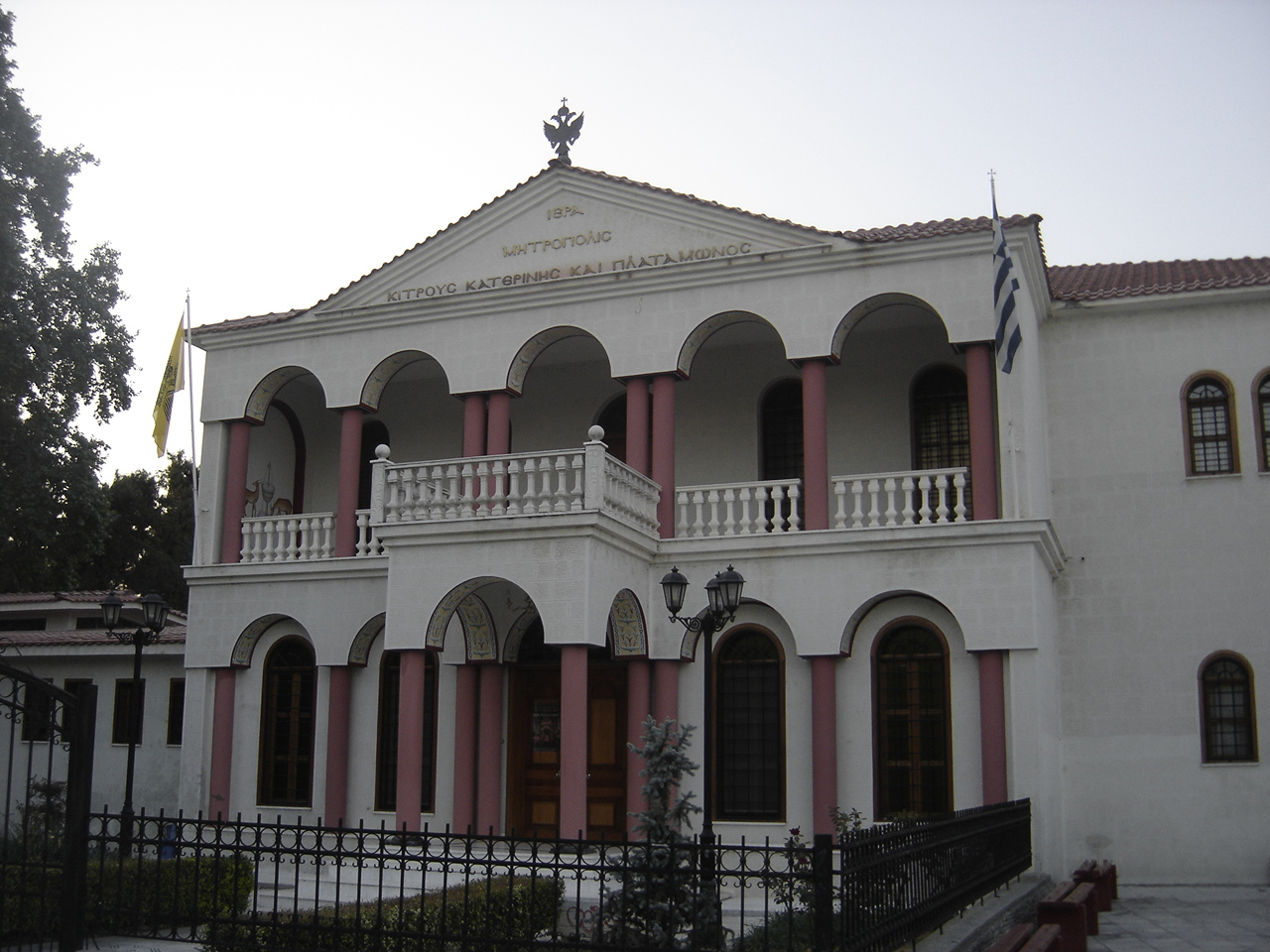
The episcopal cathedral in Katerini

The cathedral is in nearby Katerini.

== Monasteries ==
- Monastery of St. Dionysios in Olympos (For Men)
- Monastery of St. Efrem in Kontariotissa (For Women)
- Monastery of St. Athanasios (For Women)
- Monastery of the Virgin (Panagia) in Makrirachi (For Women)

== Bibliography ==
- Kiminas, Demetrius (2009). The Ecumenical Patriarchate: A History of Its Metropolitanates with Annotated Hierarch Catalogs. Wildside Press LLC. ISBN 9781434458766.
