= Mikri Milia, Pieria =

Mikri Milia Μικρή Μηλιά
- Settlement
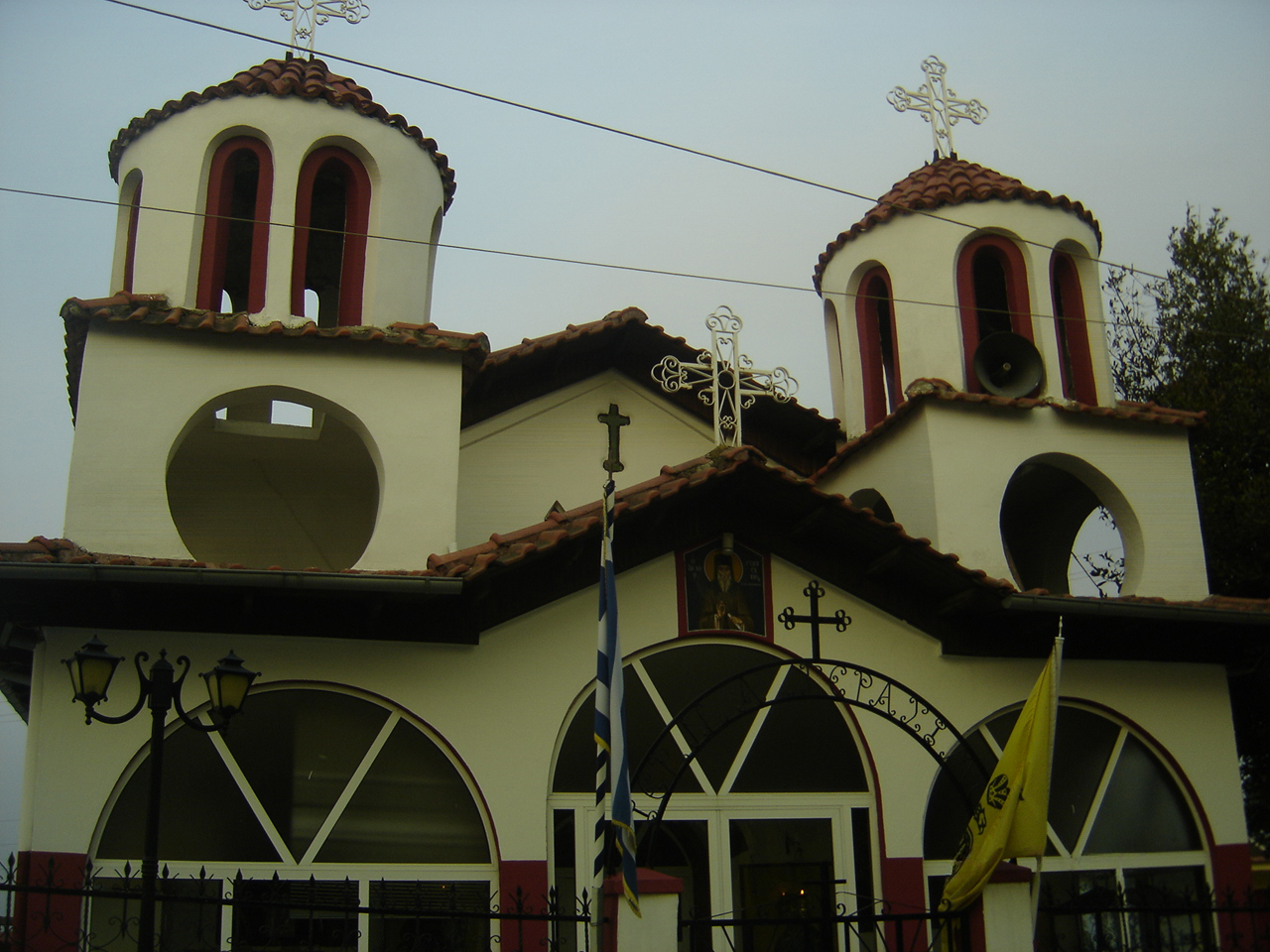
- The church of Mikri Milia

- Location within Greece
- Coordinates: 40°24.77′N 22°26.793′E
- Country: Greece
- Administrative region: Central Macedonia
- Regional unit: Pieria
- Municipality: Pydna-Kolindros
- Municipal unit: Pydna
- Community: Palaiostani
- Elevation: 380 m (1,250 ft)

Population (2021)
  - Total: 12
- Time zone: UTC+2 (EET)
  - Summer (DST): UTC+3 (EEST)
- Postal code: 600 64
- Area code: +30-2351
- Vehicle registration: KN

Mikri Milia (Greek: Μικρή Μηλιά) is a village of the Pydna-Kolindros municipality. Before the 2011 local government reform it was part of the municipality of Pydna. The 2021 census recorded 12 inhabitants in the village. Mikri Milia is a part of the community of Palaiostani.

== See also ==
- List of settlements in the Pieria regional unit
