= Katachas =

Katachas Καταχάς
- Community
- Location within Greece
- Coordinates: 40°28′N 22°32.5′E
- Country: Greece
- Administrative region: Central Macedonia
- Regional unit: Pieria
- Municipality: Pydna-Kolindros
- Municipal unit: Aiginio

Population (2021)
  - Community: 509
- Time zone: UTC+2 (EET)
  - Summer (DST): UTC+3 (EEST)
- Postal code: 603 00
- Area code: +30-2351
- Vehicle registration: KN

Katachas (Greek: Καταχάς) is a village in Pieria regional unit, Greece. Since the 2011 local government reform it is part of the municipality Pydna-Kolindros, of which it is a municipal community. The village of Katachas had 509 residents as of 2021.
