= Methon =

Methon (Greek: Μέθων), an ancestor of Orpheus, was considered the founder of Methone in Pieria.
