= Anthypatos =

Milestone of c. 142 BC on the Via Egnatia mentioning Gnaeus Egnatius as both proconsul and anthypatos.

Anthypatos (Greek: ἀνθύπατος, anti- + hypatos) is the translation in Greek of the Latin proconsul. In the Greek-speaking East, it was used to denote this office in Roman and early Byzantine times, surviving as an administrative office until the 9th century. Thereafter, and until the 11th century, it became a senior Byzantine court dignity.

== History and functions ==
=== Gubernatorial title ===
The title of anthypatos was the traditional Greek translation of the Latin title of proconsul. Under the Principate, the title of anthypatos/proconsul had been borne by all governors of a senatorial province, irrespective of whether they had previously been consuls, but after the reforms of Diocletian (r. 284–305– ), there were only two: the governors of Asia and Africa. The Notitia Dignitatum of c. 400, on the other hand, mentions three, with the proconsuls of Africa (Pars Occ. XVIII) and Asia (Pars Or. XX) being joined by the proconsul of Achaea or Hellas (Pars Or. XXI). To them was added Constantinople after it became the imperial capital in 330, and until 359, when the post was replaced by an urban prefect, similar and equal to Rome.

Following the fall of the Western Roman Empire, only the proconsuls of Achaea and Asia remained, until the reforms of Justinian I (r. 527–565– ) in the 530s: Justinian merged provinces together and reunited civil and military authority in them under the same person, to whom he gave the rank of anthypatos/proconsul, or the title of praetor with a proconsular rank. Such provinces were Armenia Prima, Cappadocia, Dalmatia, and Palaestina Prima. According to the contemporary official and writer Peter the Patrician, the anthypatoi are equated to the August governors of Egypt, and equal in rank to the comites consistoriales. When Africa was recovered in the Vandalic War (533–534), the proconsular governor was not restored; instead a consularis was appointed.

After the establishment of the themata in the 7th century, the title was used within the context of the thematic structure: thematic eparchoi kai anthypatoi ("eparchs and proconsuls") are still in evidence in Asia Minor until the early 9th century, functioning as civil governors, possibly under the authority of the (much reduced in power) praetorian prefect in Constantinople. However, with the progressive unification of civil and military power in the hands of the thematic strategos, by the reign of Emperor Theophilos (r. 829–842– ) the title of anthypatos had become a simple court dignity.

=== Court dignity ===
Theophanes the Confessor records that Emperor Theophilos honoured Alexios Mousele, the husband of his daughter Maria, by naming him "patrikios and anthypatos", raising him above the ordinary patricians. This change coincided with the abolition of the last vestiges of the old Roman system, as the provincial anthypatoi as civil governors were abolished, and replaced by the stratēgos of the thema, and in their role as overseers of army provisioning and financial matters, by the much less prestigious prōtonotarioi.

Thus, from the latter part of Michael III's reign (842–867), the term became a regular dignity intended for "bearded men" (i.e. non-eunuchs), constituting a class above the patrikioi. The full title anthypatos kai patrikios was henceforth conferred upon several high-ranking administrative and military officials throughout the 10th and 11th centuries. In the 11th century, there is also evidence of a prōtanthypatos (πρωτανθύπατος, "first anthypatos"), and a single occurrence of a disanthypatos (δισανθύπατος, "twice anthypatos"). All these dignities disappeared, however, in the early 12th century.

According to the Klētorologion of Philotheos, written in 899, the insignia of office of the anthypatos were purple inscribed tablets. Their award by the Byzantine emperor signified the elevation of the recipient to the office.

== See also ==
- Hypatos

== Sources ==
- Bury, J. B.; Philotheus (1911). The Imperial Administrative System of the Ninth Century (With a Revised Text of the Kletorologion of Philotheos). London: Oxford University Press.
- Guilland, Rodolphe (1967). "Le Proconsul (ὁ ἀνθύπατος)". Recherches sur les institutions byzantines [Studies on the Byzantine Institutions]. Berliner byzantinische Arbeiten 35 (in French). Vol. I. Berlin and Amsterdam: Akademie-Verlag & Adolf M. Hakkert. pp. 68–88. OCLC 878894516.
- Haldon, John F. (1997). Byzantium in the Seventh Century: The Transformation of a Culture. Cambridge: Cambridge University Press. ISBN 978-0-521-31917-1.
- Kazhdan, Alexander (1991). "Anthypatos". In Kazhdan, Alexander (ed.). The Oxford Dictionary of Byzantium. Oxford and New York: Oxford University Press. p. 111. ISBN 0-19-504652-8.
