= Nea Agathoupoli =

Village in Pieria, Greece

Nea Agathoupoli Νέα Αγαθούπολη
- Community
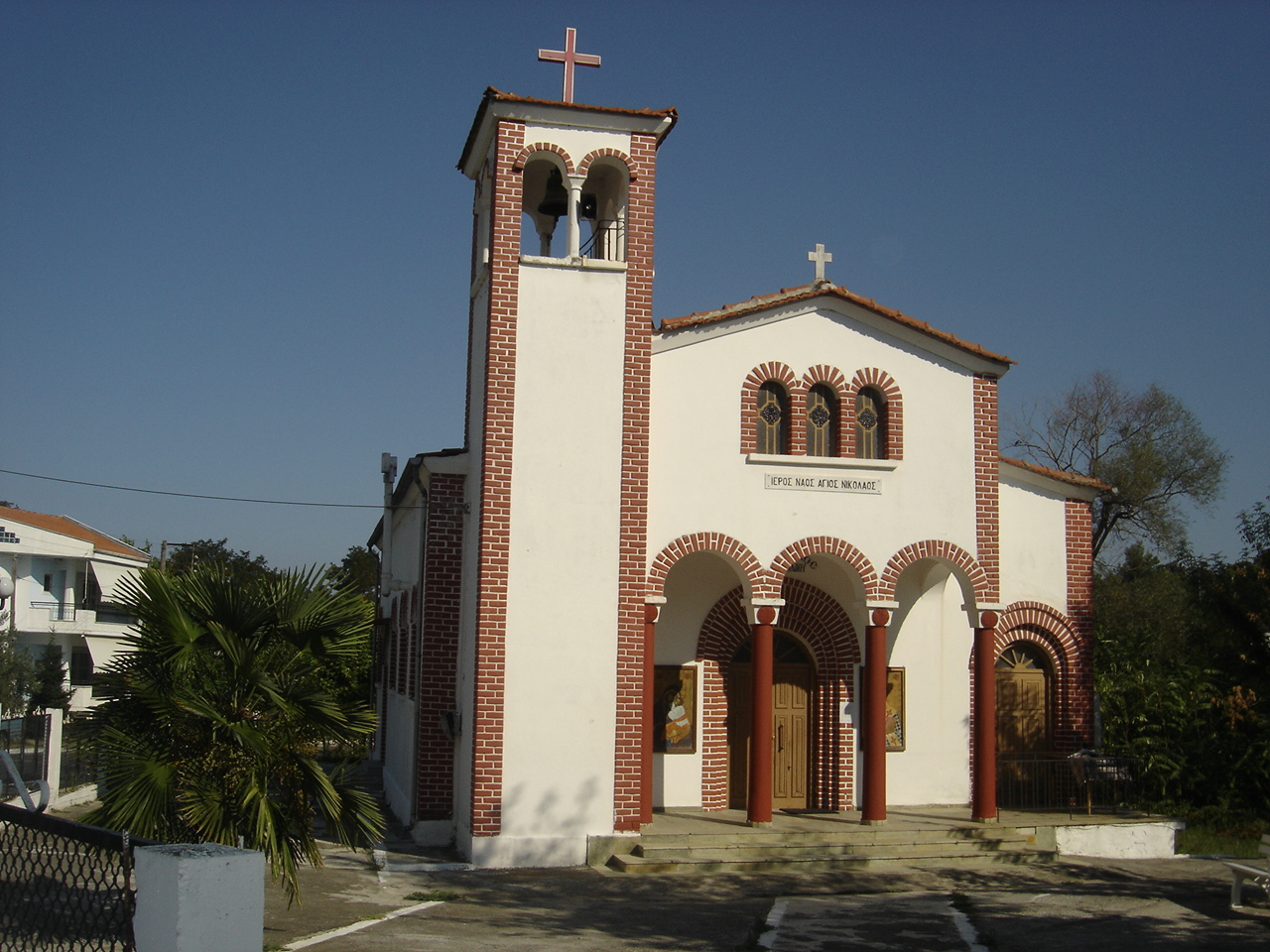
- Agios Nikolaos church in Nea Agathoupoli

- Location within Greece
- Coordinates: 40°27.5′N 22°35′E
- Country: Greece
- Administrative region: Central Macedonia
- Regional unit: Pieria
- Municipality: Pydna-Kolindros
- Municipal unit: Methoni
- Elevation: 20 m (66 ft)

Population (2021)
  - Community: 204
- Time zone: UTC+2 (EET)
  - Summer (DST): UTC+3 (EEST)
- Postal code: 600 66
- Area code: +30-2353
- Vehicle registration: KN

Nea Agathoupoli (Greek: Νέα Αγαθούπολη) is a village in Pieria, Greece. Since the 2011 local government reform it is part of the municipality Pydna-Kolindros, of which it is a municipal community. The 2021 census recorded 204 residents in the village.

The village was founded in the 1920s by ethnic Greek refugees from Ahtopol (Agathoupoli) on the Bulgarian Black Sea coast; its name translates to "New Ahtopol".

== See also ==
- List of settlements in the Pieria regional unit
