= Gulyantsi =

Gulyantsi Гулянци
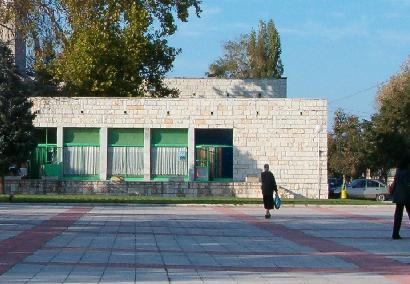
- The main square in Gulyantsi

- Location of Gulyantsi
- Coordinates: 43°38′N 24°42′E
- Country: Bulgaria
- Provinces (Oblast): Pleven

Government
  - Mayor: Lachezar Yakov
- Elevation: 18 m (59 ft)

Population (December 2009)
  - Total: 3,432
- Time zone: UTC+2 (EET)
  - Summer (DST): UTC+3 (EEST)
- Postal Code: 5960
- Area code: 06561

Gulyantsi (Bulgarian: Гулянци, pronounced [ɡoˈʎant͡si]; also transliterated Guljanci, Gulyanci, Guliantzi, Gulyantzi, etc.) is a town in central northern Bulgaria, part of Pleven Province. It is the administrative centre of Gulyantsi municipality and lies in the central north of the province, near the town of Nikopol, very close to the Danube River. As of December 2009, the town had a population of 3,432.

Gulyantsi lies 34 kilometres north of the provincial capital Pleven, 4 kilometres south of the Danube and 7-8 kilometres southwest of the mouth of the Iskar River at Gigen village. It was proclaimed a town on 4 September 1974.
