= Gnaeus Egnatius =

Milestone of c. 142 BC mentioning him as cn(aeus) egnati(us) c(ai) f(ilius) proco(n)s(ul), and in Greek as Gnaios Egnatios anthypatos.

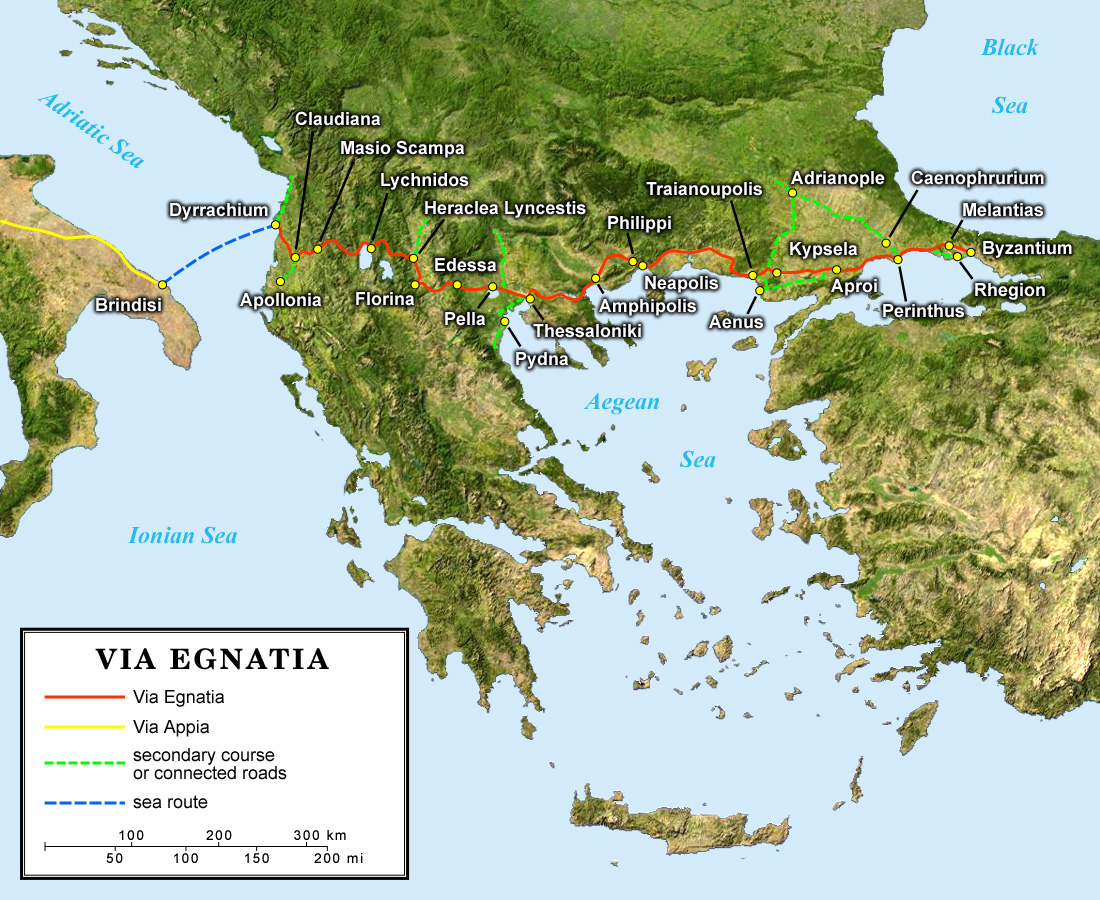
Map of the Via Egnatia (red line)

Gnaeus Egnatius (Ancient Greek: Γναίος Εγνάτιος; fl. second century BC) was a Roman senator who gave his name to the Via Egnatia.

== Biography ==
Gnaeus Egnatius, the son of Gaius Egnatius, was a plebeian and a member of the tribe Stellatina. A member of the Roman Senate, he first turns up in the historical record around the year 149 BC, where he appeared as the senior witness to a Senatus consultum sent to Corcyra. Egnatius was elected Praetor sometime prior to 146 BC, and following this he was assigned the newly created province of Macedonia as its Proconsular governor, replacing Quintus Caecilius Metellus Macedonicus who had just finished pacifying the new province.

During his tenure as governor of Macedonia, Gnaeus Egnatius began the construction of the eponymous Via Egnatia which was begun in 146 BC and completed in 120 BC. His portion of the Roman road began at the Adriatic Sea, crossed the Pindus mountains and travelled eastward into central Macedonia, ending at Thessalonica. Nothing further is known of his tenure as governor of Macedonia, or of his subsequent career.

== Sources ==
- Brennan, T. Corey, The Praetorship in the Roman Republic, Volume 2 (2000)
- Broughton, T. Robert S., The Magistrates of the Roman Republic, Vol III (1986)
- Sherk, Robert Kenneth, Rome and the Greek East to the Death of Augustus (1984)
