= Gigen =

Gigen Гиген
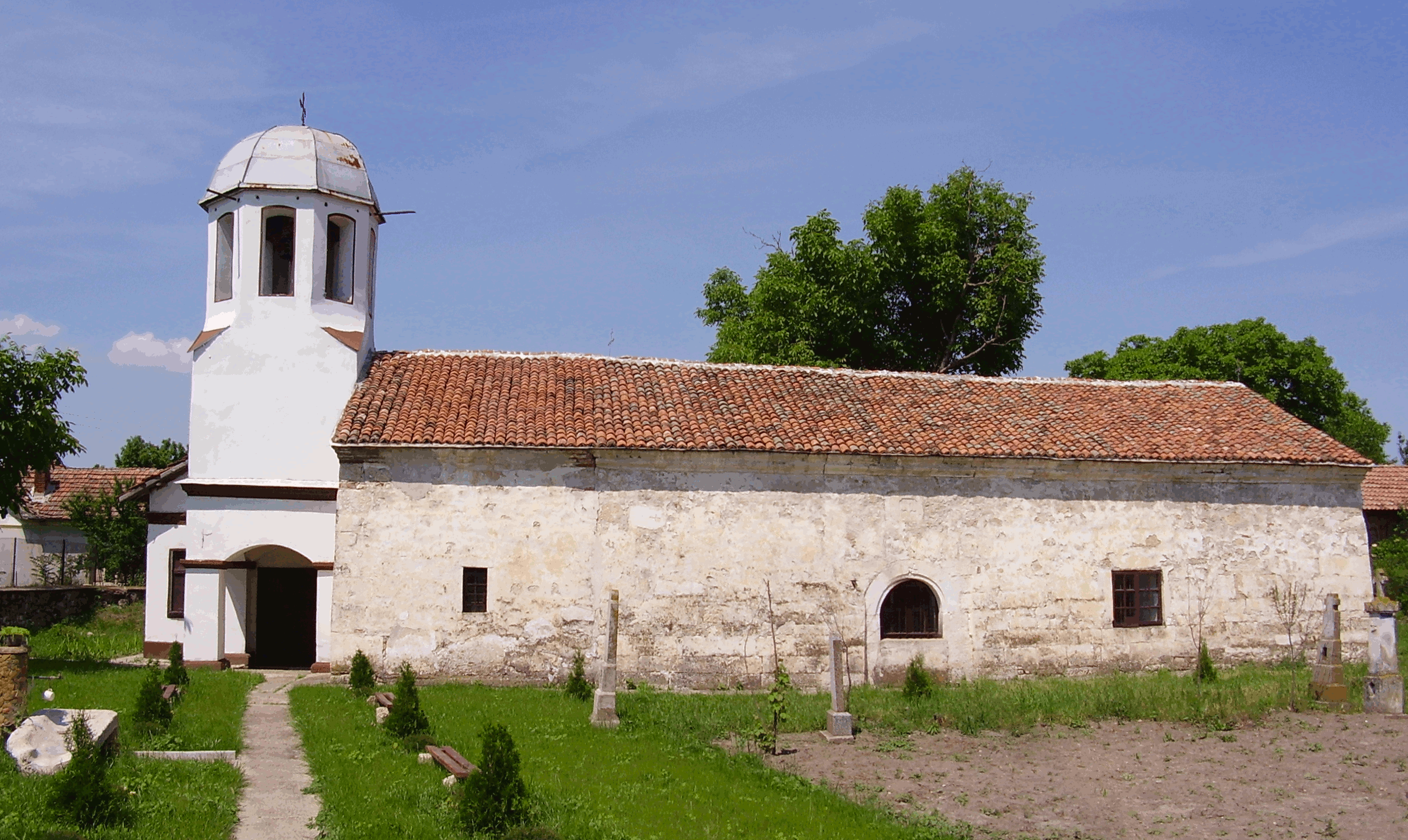
- The Church of St George in Gigen

- Gigen
- Coordinates: 43°42′N 24°29′E
- Country: Bulgaria
- Province (Oblast): Pleven

Government
  - Mayor: Krasimir Parvanov (died early 2024 (was Mayor of Gigen for more than a decade, was much appreciated by the villagers) Verka Tonova - new Mayor as of early 2024 (Ataka)
- Elevation: 39 m (128 ft)

Population (2024)
  - Total: 1,641
- Time zone: UTC+2 (EET)
  - Summer (DST): UTC+3 (EEST)
- Postal Code: 5970
- Area code: 06562

Gigen (Bulgarian: Гиген, pronounced [ɟiˈɟɛn]) is a village in northern Bulgaria, part of Gulyantsi Municipality, Pleven Province. It is located near the Danube River, opposite the Romanian town of Corabia. As of 2024, Gigen has a population of 1,641 inhabitants. Gigen Peak on Graham Land in Antarctica is named after the village.

== Geography ==
The village is situated in the central division of the Danubian Plain in the fertile Chernopolska lowland at an altitude of 88 m. It lies just across the right bank of the river Iskar, some three kilometers from its confluence with the Danube. It falls within the temperate continental climatic zone. The soils are alluvial and chernozem.

Administratively, Gigen is part of Gulyantsi Municipality, situated in the northwestern part of Pleven Province. Its territory is 65.605 km^{2}. The closest settlements are the villages of Baykal to the west, Iskar to the southwest, Brest to the southeast, and Zagrazhden to the northeast. Gigen is situated on the second class II-11 road Lom–Kozloduy–Gulyantsi.

== History ==
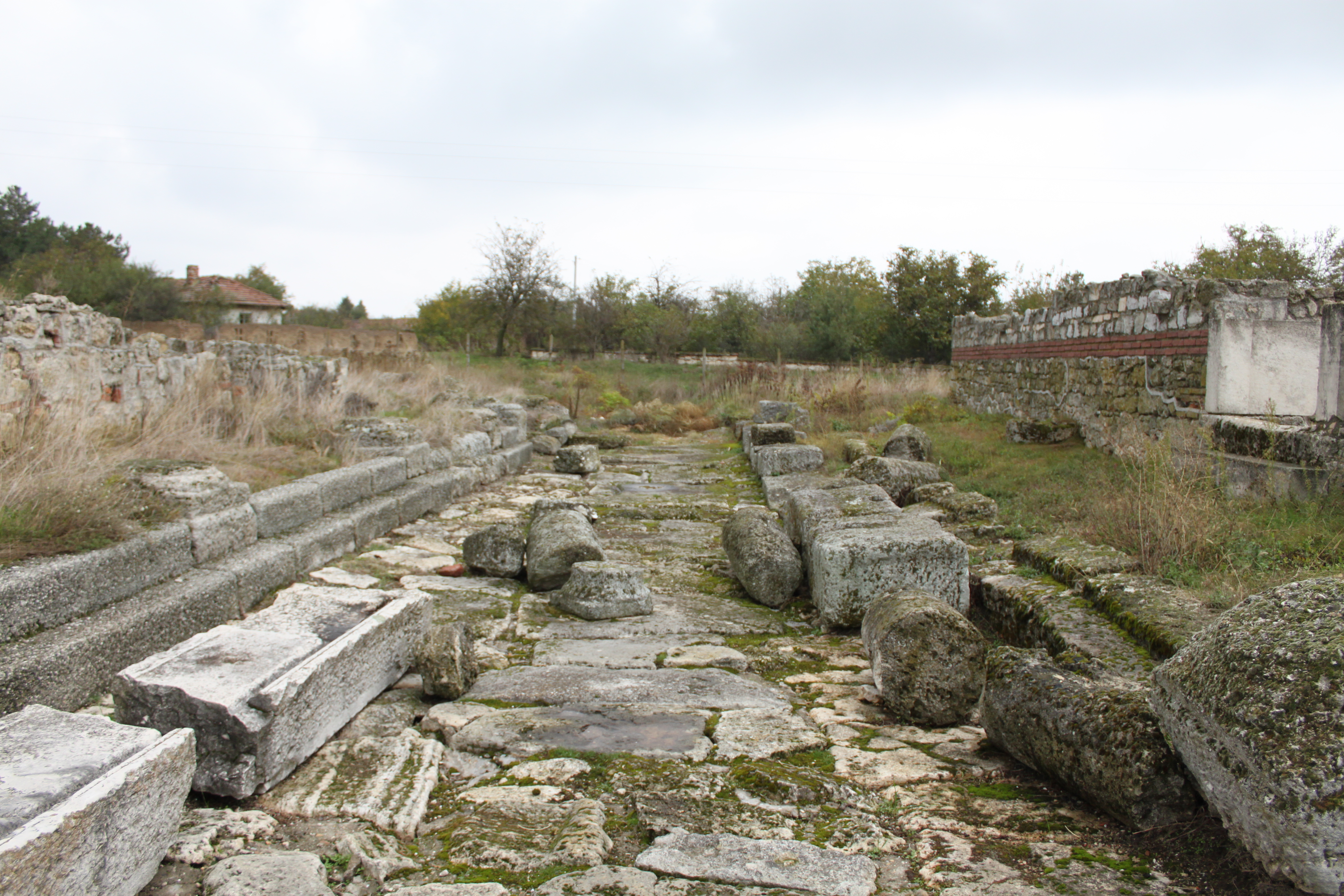
The ruins of Oescus in Gigen

Gigen is most famous for being built on the site of the important Roman colony of Oescus. The extensive ruins are located in the northwestern part of the village and were first associated with the ancient colony in the end of the 17th century. A bridge, built or reconstructed by Constantine I and named Constantine's Bridge in his honour, linked Oescus with Sucidava (modern Corabia) across the Danube in the 4th century.

Gigen is also known for an anti-Bogomil inscription in Old Bulgarian dating to the 10th century, the rule of Tsar Peter I of Bulgaria. The text was discovered in the old village church, inscribed on a stone block 85 centimetres in width. According to the scientifically accepted reading, the text of the inscription is as follows:

иже ... проч[ътет]ъ [еже нап]иса(х) [да проклъ]нетъ [ер]етика. аще бо и не про[клънетъ]. то д[а бѫ]детъ самъ проклѧ[тъ аще ж]е проклънетъ еретика. то [с]его бъ҃ гъ҃ помилоуетъ + се же писа анани мо[нахъ].

The one... who reads [what I wrote] [should curse] the heretic. If they do not curse him, then they shall be cursed themselves. Or if they curse the heretic, may God have mercy on them + So wrote the [monk] Anani.

Gigen was an important fortress of the First and Second Bulgarian Empire. In 1393 it was conquered by the Ottomans during the Bulgarian–Ottoman wars. It was mentioned in Ottoman documents of 1430.

== Culture and economy ==
The Church of St George was constructed 1841. The first school in Gigen was founded in 1835 and moved to a dedicated building in 1872. There were three schools in the 20th century. The local cultural center, known in Bulgarian as a chitalishte, was established in 1907 and is named "Iskra", meaning Sparkle. The chitalishte has a library, a small art gallery, a museum, and maintains a local amateur folklore group.

Gigen lies in a rich agricultural area and has a well-developed agriculture. The main crops include many varieties of cereals, fruits and vegetables, as well as grapes. Livestock breeding is also developed, especially cattle and pigs.
