= Aiginio =

Town in Pieria, Greece

Aiginio Αιγίνιο
- Municipal unit
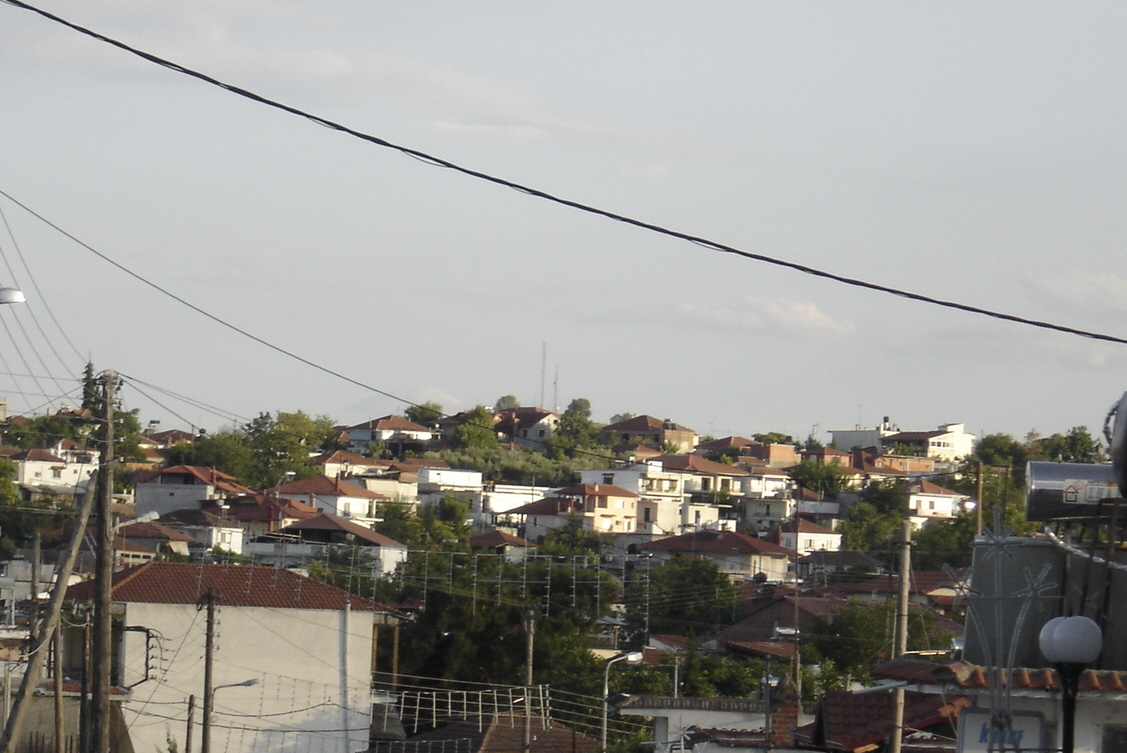

- Location within the regional unit

- Location within Greece
- Coordinates: 40°30′N 22°32′E
- Country: Greece
- Administrative region: Central Macedonia
- Regional unit: Pieria
- Municipality: Pydna-Kolindros

Area
  - Municipal unit: 75.541 km^{2} (29.167 sq mi)
  - Community: 62.246 km^{2} (24.033 sq mi)

Population (2021)
  - Municipal unit: 4,369
  - Municipal unit density: 57.84/km^{2} (149.8/sq mi)
  - Community: 3,860
  - Community density: 62.0/km^{2} (161/sq mi)
- Time zone: UTC+2 (EET)
  - Summer (DST): UTC+3 (EEST)
- Postal code: 603 00
- Area code: 23530
- Vehicle registration: KN

Aiginio (Greek: Αιγίνιο, Αιγίνιον), known before 1926 as Libanovo (Greek: Λιμπάνοβο), is a town and a former municipality in Pieria regional unit, Greece. Since the 2011 local government reform it is part of the municipality Pydna-Kolindros, of which it is the seat and a municipal unit. The municipal unit has an area of 75.541 km^{2}, the community 62.246 km^{2}. The population of the municipal unit was 4,369 people and the population of the community was 3,860 people as of 2021.

== Transport ==
Aiginio is served by a railway station, which is served by Proastiakos.

== Municipal unit ==
The municipal unit of Aiginio consists of the settlements of Aiginio, Megali Gefyra and Katachas. Aiginio and Megali Gefyra constitute the community of Aiginio while Katachas is the other community of the municipal unit.

== Sporting teams ==
Aiginio hosts the sport clubs Aiginiakos F.C., football club that have played in third national division and the volleyball club Niki Aiginiou that plays in A1 Ethniki Volleyball (first level).

Sport clubs based in Aiginio
Club	Founded	Sports	Achievements
Aiginiakos F.C.	1972	Football	Presence in Football League
Niki Aiginiou	1990	Volleyball	presence in A1 Ethniki volleyball
