= Via Egnatia =

Roman road across the southern Balkans

Via Egnatia / Ἐγνατία Ὁδός
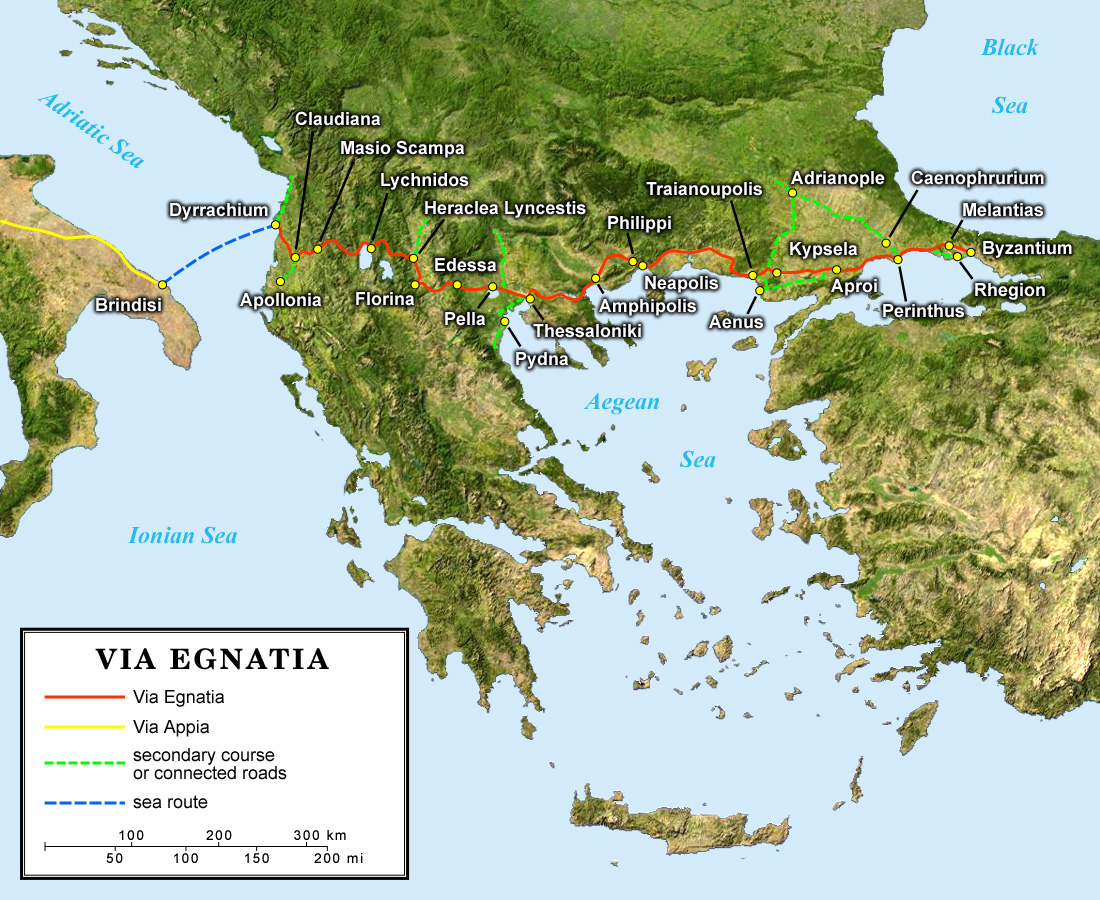
- Route of the Via Egnatia
- Type: Roman road
- Periods: 2nd century BC
- Location: Dyrrachium to Byzantium (later Constantinople)

History
- Built by: Roman Republic, Gnaeus Egnatius proconsul of Macedonia

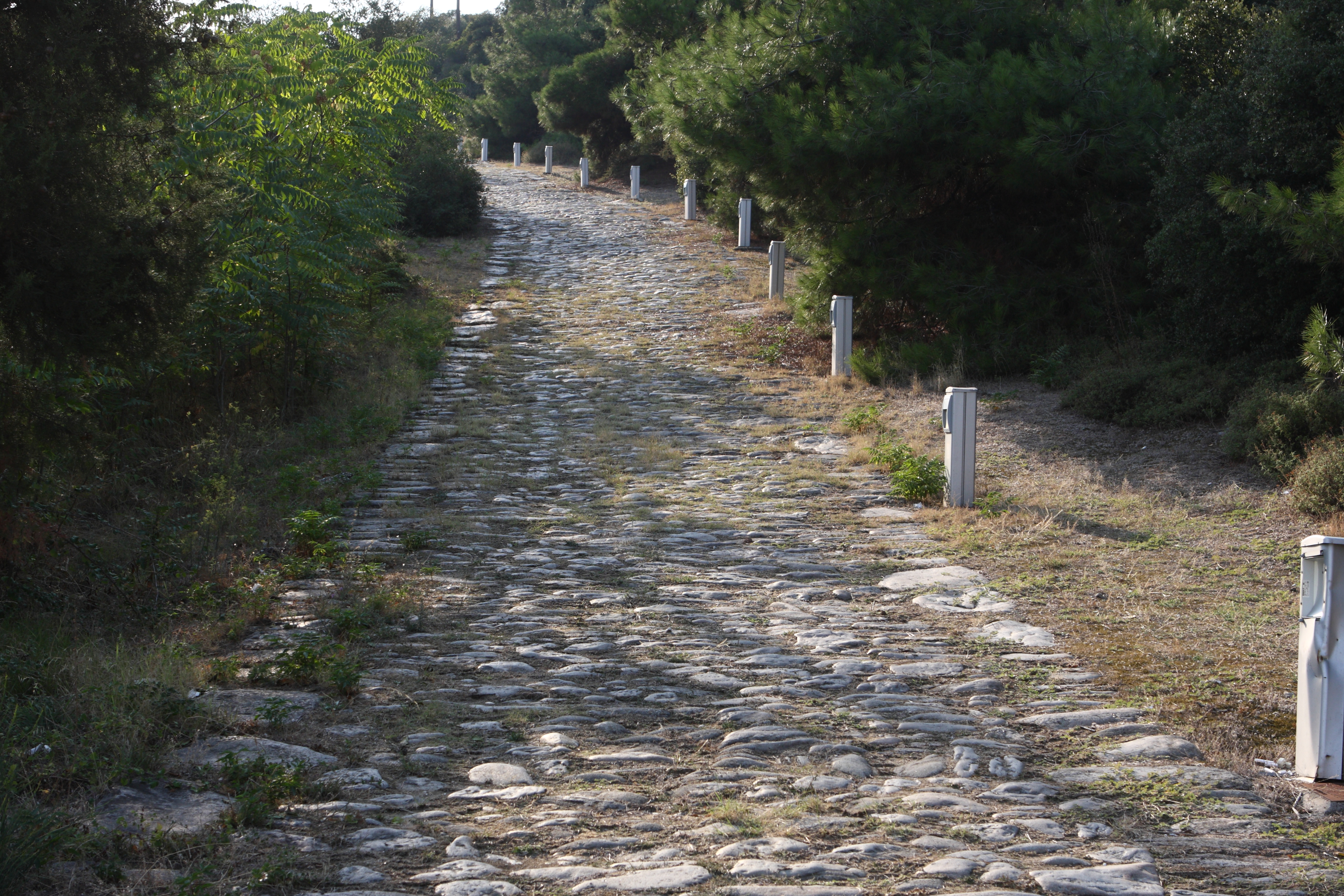
Ancient Via Egnatia in Kavala (Neapolis)

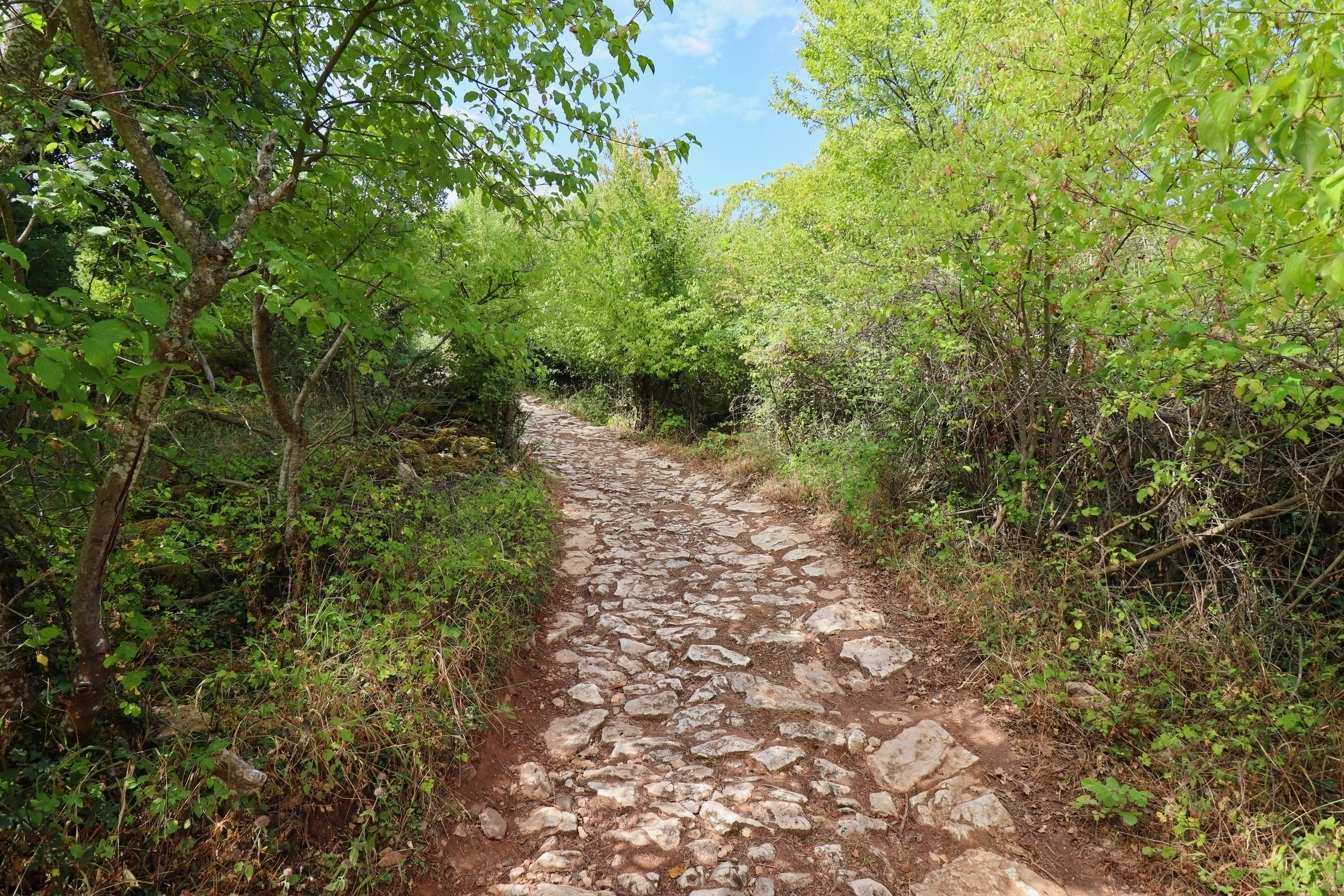
Remains of Via Egnatia near Radozda

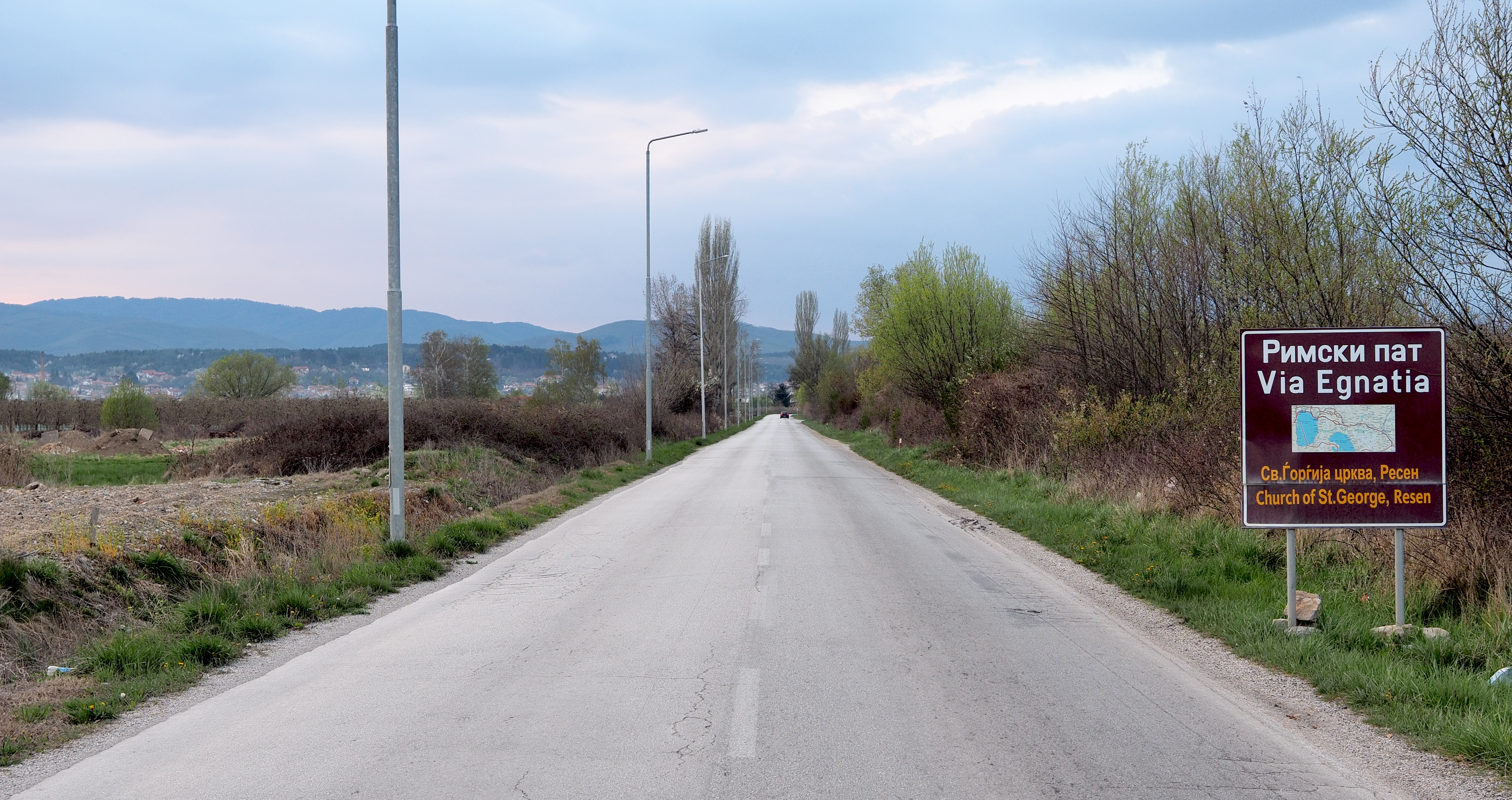
Via Egnatia by Resen in North Macedonia, now part of A-3 motorway

The Via Egnatia (lit. 'Egnatius' Way') was a road constructed by the Romans in the 2nd century BC. It crossed the Roman provinces of Illyricum, Macedonia, and Thracia, running through territory that is now part of modern Albania, Greece, North Macedonia and European Turkey as a continuation of the Via Appia.

Starting at Dyrrachium (now Durrës) on the Adriatic Sea, the road followed a difficult route along the river Genusus (Shkumbin), over the Candaviae (Jablanica) mountains and thence to the highlands around Lake Ohrid. It then turned by parts south, following several high mountain passes to reach the northern coastline of the Aegean Sea at Thessalonica. From there it ran through Thrace to the city of Byzantium (later Constantinople, now Istanbul). It covered a total distance of about 1,120 km (696 miles/746 Roman miles). Like other major Roman roads, it was about six metres (19.6 ft) wide, paved with large polygonal stone slabs or covered with a hard layer of sand.

== Construction and usage ==
The main literary sources for the construction of the road are Strabo's Geographica and a number of milestones found along the route's length, marking the road for a length of 860 kilometres as far as the border between Macedonia and Thrace. Bilingual inscriptions on the milestones record that Gnaeus Egnatius, proconsul of Macedonia, ordered its construction, though the exact date is uncertain; the road presumably took its name from its builder. It may have succeeded an earlier military road from Illyria to Byzantium, as described by Polybius and Cicero, which the Romans apparently built over and/or improved.

The Via Egnatia was constructed in order to link a chain of Roman colonies stretching from the Adriatic Sea to the Bosphorus. The termini of the Via Egnatia and the Via Appia, leading from Rome itself, were almost directly opposite each other on the east and west shores of the Adriatic Sea. The route, thus gave the colonies of the southern Balkans a direct connection to Rome. It was also a vital link to Roman territories further to the east; until a more northerly route across Illyria was opened under Augustus it was Rome's main link with her empire in the eastern Mediterranean. It was repaired and expanded several times but experienced lengthy periods of neglect due to Rome's civil wars.

The road was used by the Apostle Paul on his second missionary journey as he traveled from Philippi to Thessalonica (Acts 16–17). It also played a vital role in several key moments in Roman history: the armies of Julius Caesar and Pompey marched along the Via Egnatia during Caesar's civil war, and during the Liberators' civil war Mark Antony and Octavian pursued Cassius and Brutus along the Via Egnatia to their fateful meeting at the Battle of Philippi. Surviving milestones record that the emperor Trajan undertook extensive repairs of the road prior to his campaign of 113 against the Parthians. However, by the 5th century AD the road had largely fallen into disuse as a result of violent instability in the region. A 5th-century historian noted that the western sections of the Via Egnatia were in such a poor state that travellers could barely pass along it.

In later years, the Via Egnatia was revived as a key road of the Eastern Roman Empire; Procopius records repairs made by Eastern Roman emperor Justinian I during the 6th century, though even then the dilapidated road was said to be virtually unusable during wet weather. Almost all Byzantine overland trade with western Europe traveled along the Via Egnatia. During the Crusades, armies traveling to the east by land followed the road to Constantinople before crossing into Asia Minor. In the aftermath of the Fourth Crusade, control of the road was vital for the survival of the Latin Empire as well as the Byzantine successor states the Empire of Nicaea and the Despotate of Epirus.

== Post-Roman usage ==
During the first European conquests of Ottoman Turks sol kol (lit. left arm) was following the Via Egnatia.

Today there is a modern highway in Greece that is called Egnatia Odos. It runs in parallel to the Via Egnatia between Thessaloniki and the Turkish border on the Evros river, while its western, Thessaloniki-Igoumenitsa stretch runs far south of the Via Egnatia. Its name means "Via Egnatia" in Greek, alluding to its ancient counterpart.

The Via Egnatia is known as Calea Mare ("The Big Road") by the Aromanians in their native Aromanian language.

== Key towns along the Via Egnatia ==
Listed from west to east:

Ancient name	Modern name	Modern country
Dyrrachium	Durrës	Albania
Claudiana	Peqin	Albania
Apollonia	By the village of Pojani (7 km W of Fier)	Albania
Mansio Scampa	Elbasan	Albania
Lychnidos	Ohrid	North Macedonia
Damastion	Resen	North Macedonia
Heraclea	Bitola	North Macedonia
Florina	Florina	Greece
Edessa	Edessa	Greece
Pella	Pella	Greece
Thessalonike	Thessaloniki	Greece
Pydna	Possibly Kitros, 6 km SW of modern Pydna	Greece
Amphipolis	Amfipoli	Greece
Philippi	14 km NW of Kavala	Greece
Neapolis	Kavala	Greece
Anastasiopolis-Peritheorion		Greece
Traianoupolis	Traianoupoli	Greece
Kypsela	İpsala	Turkey
Aenus	Enez	Turkey
Aproi (Apros, Apris, Aprī)	Village of Kermeyan	Turkey
Adrianople	Edirne (not on the main Via Egnatia)	Turkey
Perinthus, later Heraclea	Village of Marmaraereğlisi	Turkey
Caenophrurium	Sinekli in Silivri district	Turkey
Selymbria	Silivri	Turkey
Melantias		Turkey
Rhegion	Küçükçekmece, 15 km W of Istanbul	Turkey
Hebdomon	Bakırköy, seven miles west of the Milion	Turkey
Byzantium, later Constantinople	Istanbul	Turkey

== See also ==
- Appian Way
