= Gulyantsi Municipality =

Gulyantsi Municipality Община Гулянци
- Municipality
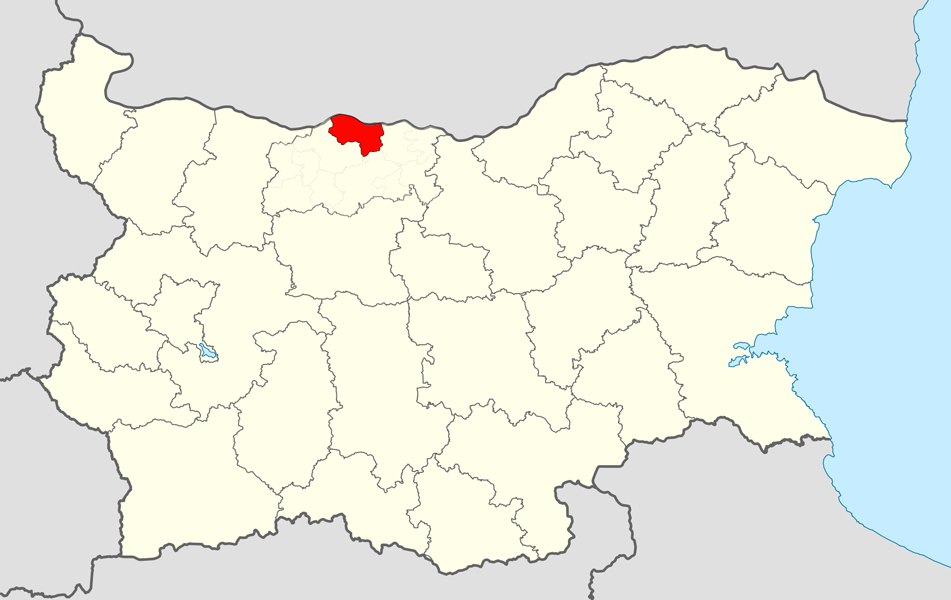
- Gulyantsi Municipality within Bulgaria and Pleven Province.
- Coordinates: 43°39′N 24°39′E
- Country: Bulgaria
- Province (Oblast): Pleven
- Admin. centre (Obshtinski tsentar): Gulyantsi

Area
  - Total: 458 km^{2} (177 sq mi)

Population (December 2009)
  - Total: 13,561
  - Density: 29.6/km^{2} (76.7/sq mi)
- Time zone: UTC+2 (EET)
  - Summer (DST): UTC+3 (EEST)

Gulyantsi Municipality (Bulgarian: Община Гулянци) is a municipality (obshtina) in Pleven Province, Northern Bulgaria, located along the right bank of Danube river, by the border with Romania. It is named after its administrative centre - the town of Gulyantsi. As of December 2009, the municipality has a total population of 13,561 inhabitants.

The main cultural sight in the municipality are the ruins of the large Ancient Roman city of Ulpia Oescus.

== Geography ==
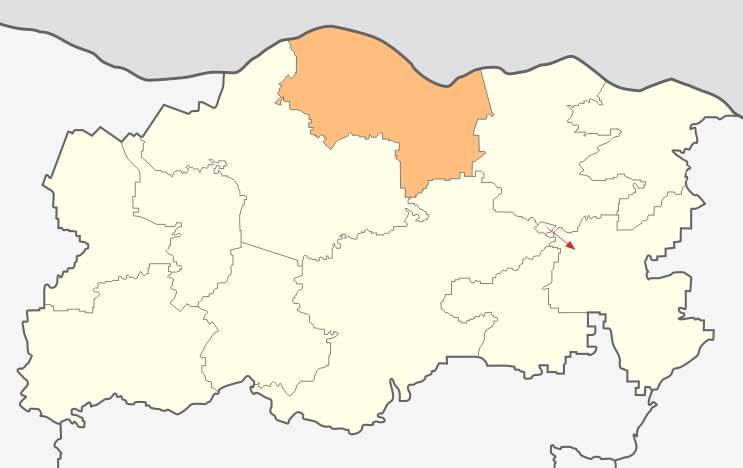
Gulyantsi Municipality within Pleven Province

Gulyantsi municipality has an area of 458 square kilometres, of which 70% is arable. The region is flat, with elevation ranging from 30 to 50 metres above sea level. The northern boundary of the municipality is the Danube River, between river kilometres 604 and 639.

== Settlements ==
Town/Village	Cyrillic	Population (December 2009)
Gulyantsi	Гулянци	3,432
Brest	Брест	2,235
Gigen	Гиген	2,192
Iskar	Искър	362
Dolni Vit	Долни Вит	519
Dabovan	Дъбован	571
Zagrazhden	Загражден	474
Kreta	Крета	331
Lenkovo	Ленково	451
Milkovitsa	Милковица	1,889
Somovit	Сомовит	721
Shiyakovo	Шияково	384
Total		13,561

== Demography ==
The following table shows the change of the population during the last four decades.

Gulyantsi Municipality
Year	1975	1985	1992	2001	2005	2007	2009	2011
Population	25,588	22,203	20,135	16,752	15,007	14,294	13,561	...
Sources: Census 2001, Census 2011, „pop-stat.mashke.org“,

=== Religion ===
According to the latest Bulgarian census of 2011, the religious composition, among those who answered the optional question on religious identification, was the following:

Religious composition of Gulyantsi Municipality
Orthodox Christianity	88.8%
Catholicism	0.5%
Protestantism	0.3%
Islam	0.8%
No religion	4.5%
Prefer not to answer, others and indefinable	5.1%

== See also ==
- Provinces of Bulgaria
- Municipalities of Bulgaria
- List of cities and towns in Bulgaria
