= Lomec =

- Municipality
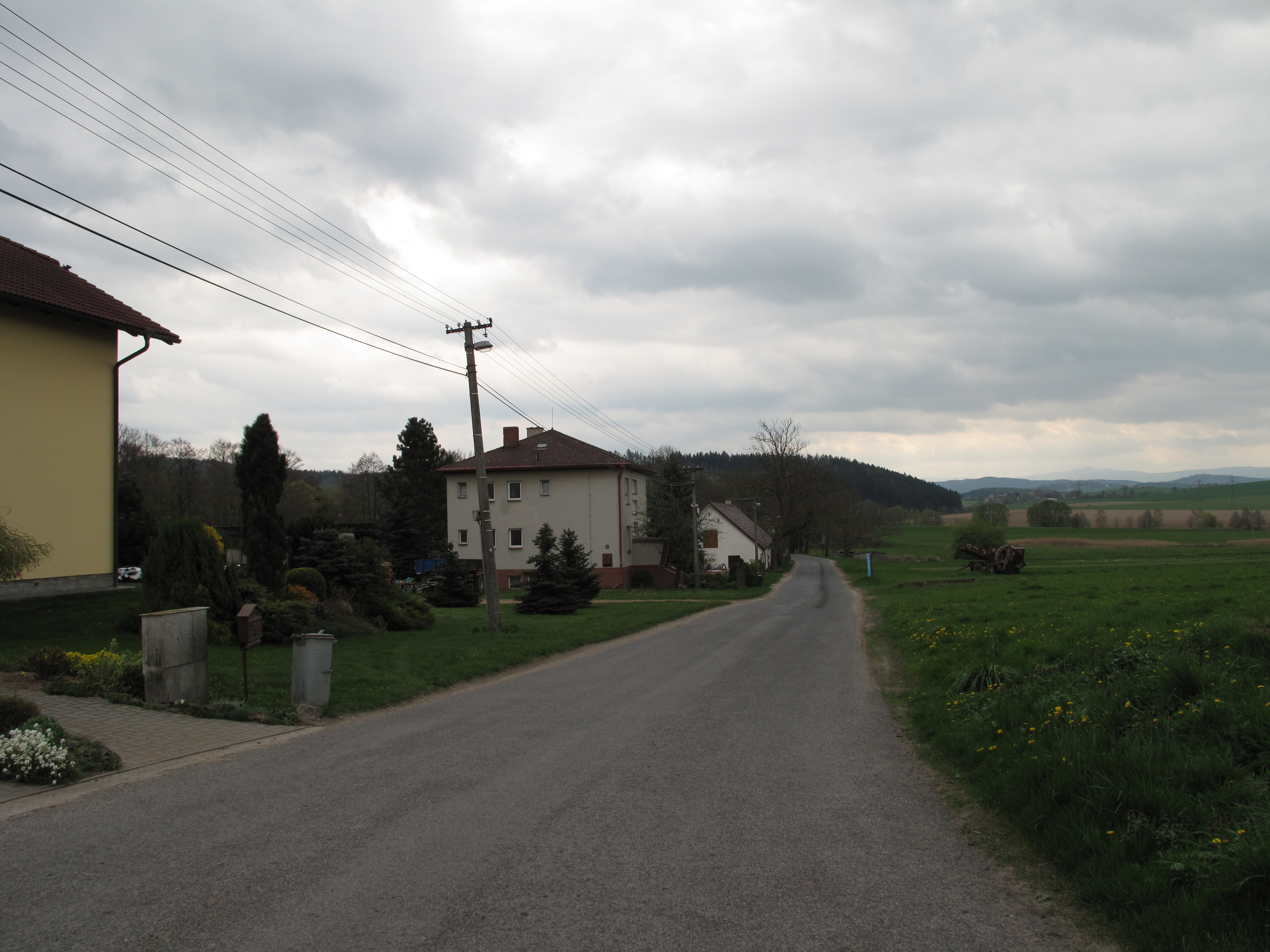
- A street in Lomec

- Location in the Czech Republic
- Coordinates: 49°22′17″N 13°16′3″E
- Country: Czech Republic
- Region: Plzeň
- District: Klatovy
- First mentioned: 1358

Area
  - Total: 3.60 km^{2} (1.39 sq mi)
- Elevation: 413 m (1,355 ft)

Population (2026-01-01)
  - Total: 129
  - Density: 35.8/km^{2} (92.8/sq mi)
- Time zone: UTC+1 (CET)
  - Summer (DST): UTC+2 (CEST)
- Postal code: 339 01
- Website: www.obeclomec.cz

Lomec is a municipality and village in Klatovy District in the Plzeň Region of the Czech Republic. It has about 100 inhabitants.

Lomec lies approximately 4 kilometres (2 mi) south of Klatovy, 43 km (27 mi) south of Plzeň, and 115 km (71 mi) south-west of Prague.

== Administrative division ==
Lomec consists of two municipal parts (in brackets population according to the 2021 census):

- Lomec (88)
- Novákovice (46)

== Demographics ==
Historical population
Year	Pop.	±%
1869	206	—
1880	241	+17.0%
1890	239	−0.8%
1900	200	−16.3%
1910	205	+2.5%
1921	216	+5.4%
1930	190	−12.0%
1950	137	−27.9%
1961	134	−2.2%
1970	96	−28.4%
1980	110	+14.6%
1991	115	+4.5%
2001	114	−0.9%
2011	135	+18.4%
2021	134	−0.7%
Source: Censuses
