= Kitros =

Village in Pieria, Greece

Kitros Κίτρος
- Settlement
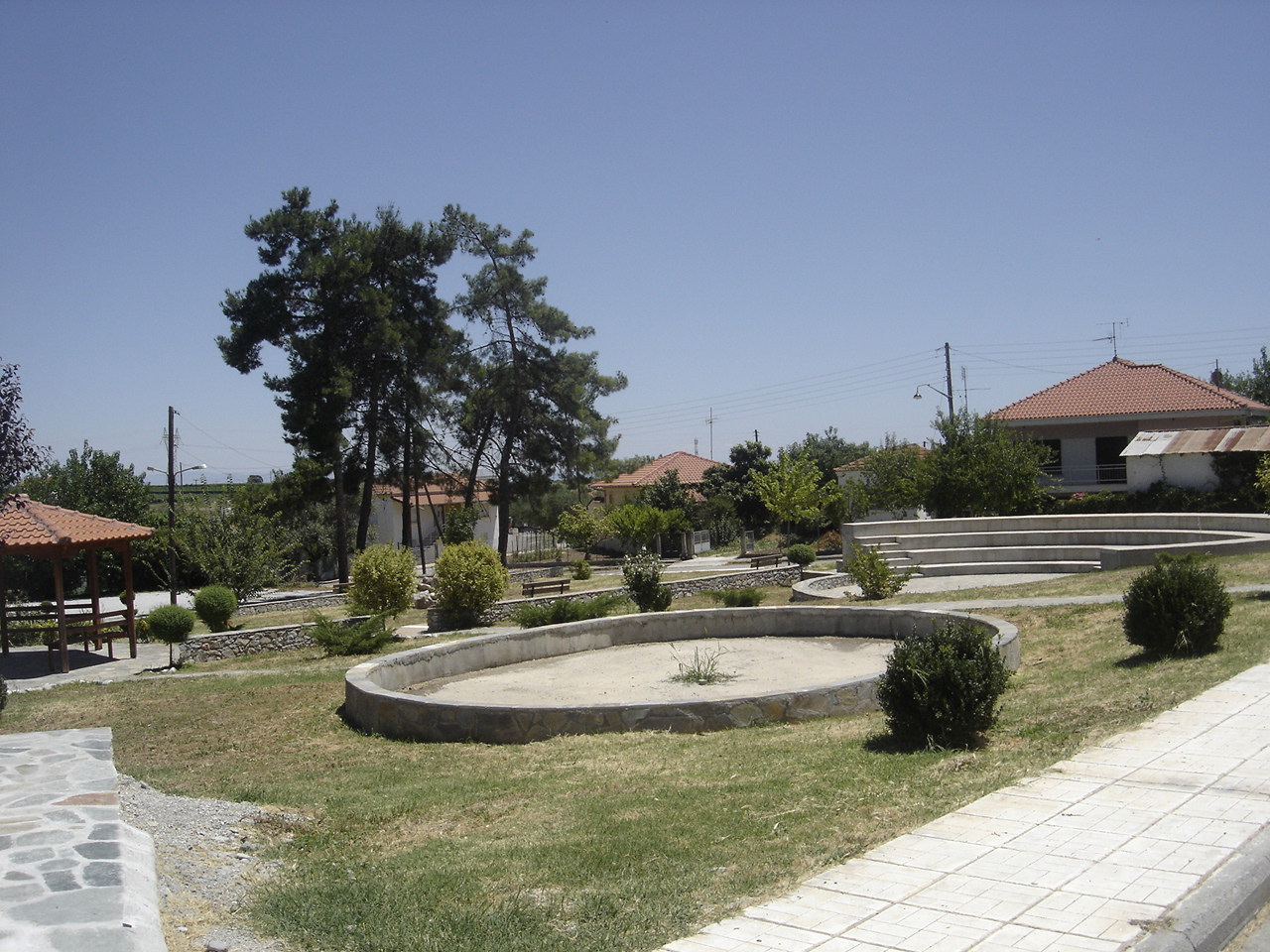
- The square of Kitros

- Location within Greece
- Coordinates: 40°22.4′N 22°34.6′E
- Country: Greece
- Administrative region: Central Macedonia
- Regional unit: Pieria
- Municipality: Pydna-Kolindros
- Municipal unit: Pydna
- Community: Pydna
- Elevation: 70 m (230 ft)

Population (2021)
  - Total: 1,061
- Time zone: UTC+2 (EET)
  - Summer (DST): UTC+3 (EEST)
- Postal code: 600 64
- Area code: +30-2351
- Vehicle registration: KN

Kitros (Greek: Κίτρος) is a village of the Pydna-Kolindros municipality. Under Ottoman rule, it was known as Çitroz (Ottoman Turkish: چتروز). Strabo is the first to mention the name Citrum. The most likely version is that Kitros took its name from the name of a Roman ruler who ruled the area.

Before the 2011 local government reform, it was part of the municipality of Pydna, of which it was the seat. The 2021 census recorded 1,061 inhabitants in the village. Kitros is a part of the community of Pydna.

Its first name was Kydna and it is not known when it was founded. After the Persian Wars it became part of the kingdom of Macedonia, under King Alexander I, until its apostasy in 410 BC.

== See also ==
- List of settlements in the Pieria regional unit
- Ancient Pydna
