= Methoni, Pieria =

Village in Central Macedonia, Greece

Methoni Μεθώνη
- Municipal unit
- Location within the regional unit

- Location within Greece
- Coordinates: 40°26′N 22°35′E
- Country: Greece
- Administrative region: Central Macedonia
- Regional unit: Pieria
- Municipality: Pydna-Kolindros

Area
  - Municipal unit: 34.286 km^{2} (13.238 sq mi)
  - Community: 10.321 km^{2} (3.985 sq mi)

Population (2021)
  - Municipal unit: 2,663
  - Municipal unit density: 77.67/km^{2} (201.2/sq mi)
  - Community: 587
  - Community density: 56.9/km^{2} (147/sq mi)
- Time zone: UTC+2 (EET)
  - Summer (DST): UTC+3 (EEST)
- Vehicle registration: KN

Methoni (Greek: Μεθώνη Πιερίας) is a village and a former municipality in Pieria regional unit, Greece. Since the 2011 local government reform it is part of the municipality Pydna-Kolindros, of which it is a municipal unit.

== Geography ==
=== Administrative division ===
The Municipal Unit of Methoni consists of the communities of Makrygialos, Methoni, Nea Agathoupoli and Palaio Eleftherochori. The seat of the former municipality of Methoni, which ceased to exist after the 2011 local government reform, was in Makrygialos. The municipal unit has an area of 34.286 km^{2}, and the community of Methoni has an area of 10.321 km^{2}.

=== Population ===
The population of the community of Methoni is 587 people and that of the municipal unit of Methoni is 2,663 people as of 2021.
