= Pydna =

Pydna Πύδνα
- Municipal unit
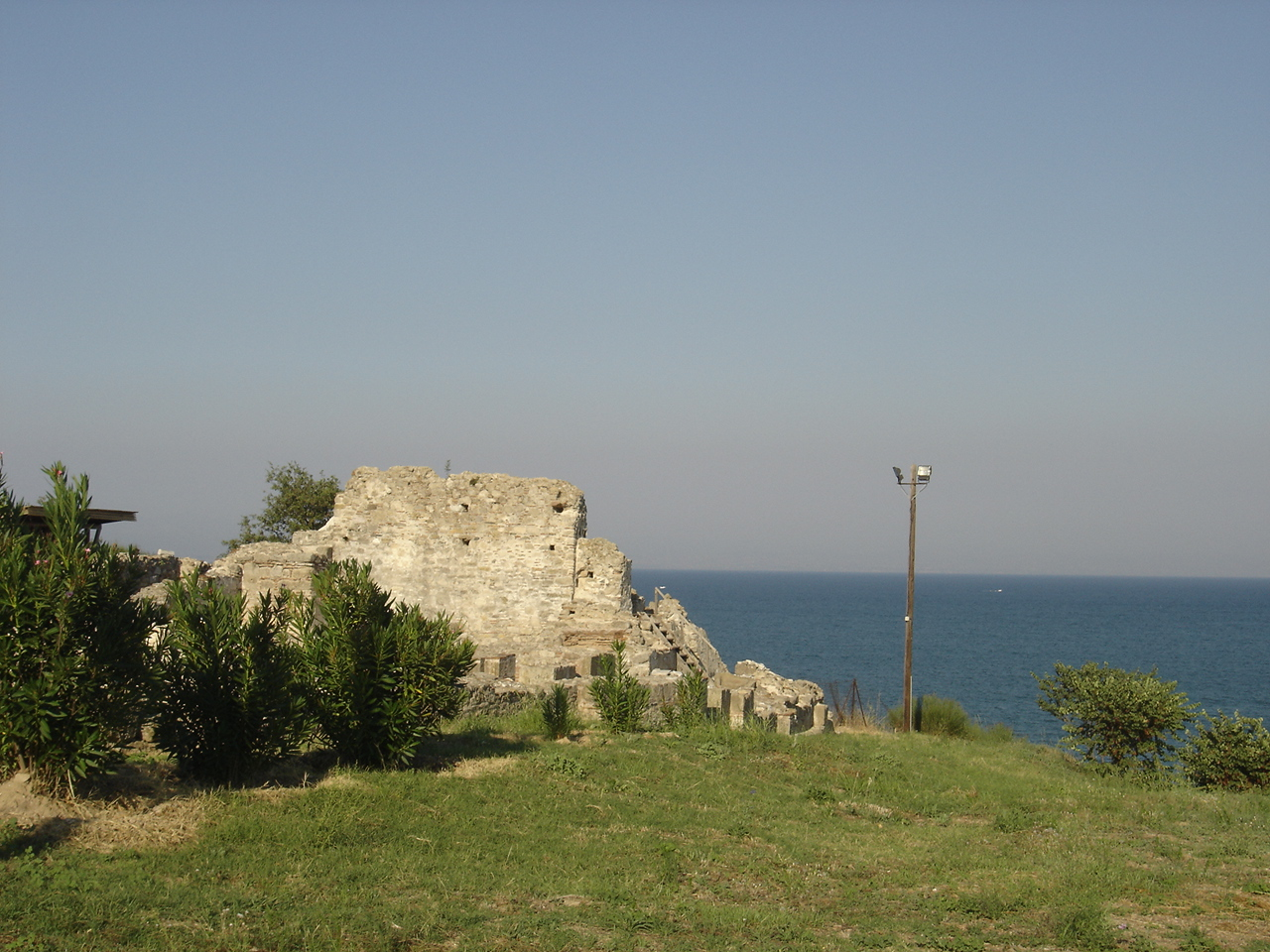

- Location within the regional unit

- Location within Greece
- Coordinates: 40°22′N 22°35′E
- Country: Greece
- Administrative region: Central Macedonia
- Regional unit: Pieria
- Municipality: Pydna-Kolindros

Area
  - Municipal unit: 105.59 km^{2} (40.77 sq mi)
  - Community: 41.334 km^{2} (15.959 sq mi)
- Elevation: 78 m (256 ft)

Population (2021)
  - Municipal unit: 2,591
  - Municipal unit density: 24.54/km^{2} (63.55/sq mi)
  - Community: 1,085
  - Community density: 26.25/km^{2} (67.99/sq mi)
- Time zone: UTC+2 (EET)
  - Summer (DST): UTC+3 (EEST)
- Postal code: 600 64
- Area code: 23510
- Vehicle registration: KN

Pydna (/ˈpɪdnə/; Greek: Πύδνα, Pýdna) is a small town and a former municipality in the northeastern part of Pieria regional unit, Greece. Since the 2011 local government reform it is part of the municipality Pydna-Kolindros, of which it is a municipal unit. The municipal unit has an area of 105.059 km^{2}, the community 41.334 km^{2}. Pydna is situated in fertile land close to the Thermaic Gulf coast. The main village of the former municipality is Kitros. It lies 6 km north of Korinos, 8 km south of Methoni and 13 km northeast of Katerini. The A1 motorway and the Piraeus–Platy railway (nearest station at Korinos) pass east of the village.

== Population ==
Year	Community	Municipal unit
1981	1,882	-
1991	1,789	4,678
2001	-	4,012
2011	1,206	3,258
2021	1,085	2,591

== See also ==
- List of settlements in the Pieria regional unit
- Battle of Pydna (168 BCE)
