= Pydna-Kolindros =

Pydna-Kolindros Πύδνα-Κολινδρός
- Municipality
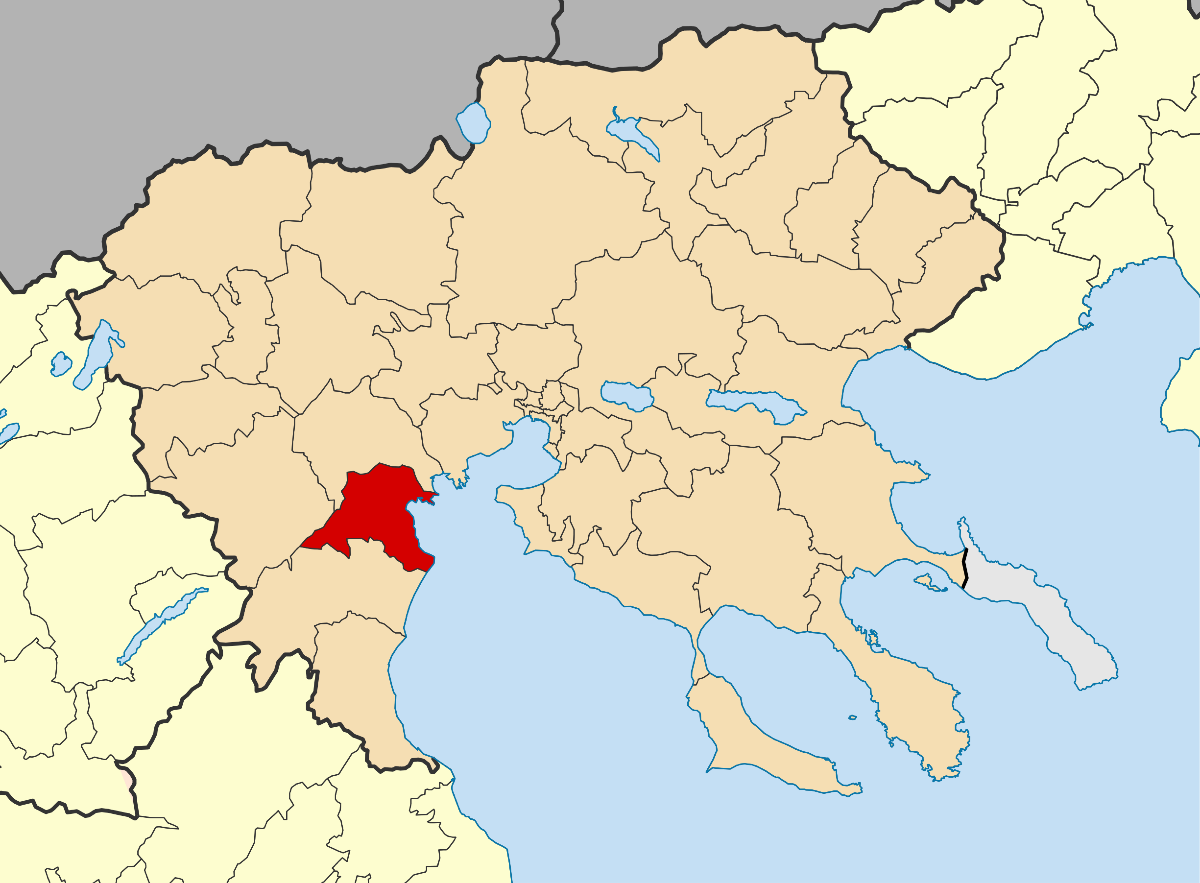

- Location within Greece
- Coordinates: 40°30′N 22°32′E
- Country: Greece
- Administrative region: Central Macedonia
- Regional unit: Pieria
- Seat: Aiginio

Area
  - Municipality: 339.53 km^{2} (131.09 sq mi)

Population (2021)
  - Municipality: 12,537
  - Density: 36.925/km^{2} (95.634/sq mi)
- Time zone: UTC+2 (EET)
  - Summer (DST): UTC+3 (EEST)

Pydna–Kolindros (Greek: Πύδνα-Κολινδρός, Pýdna-Kolindrós) is a municipality in the Pieria regional unit, Central Macedonia, Greece. The seat of the municipality is the town Aiginio. The municipality has an area of 339.525 km^{2}.

== Municipality ==
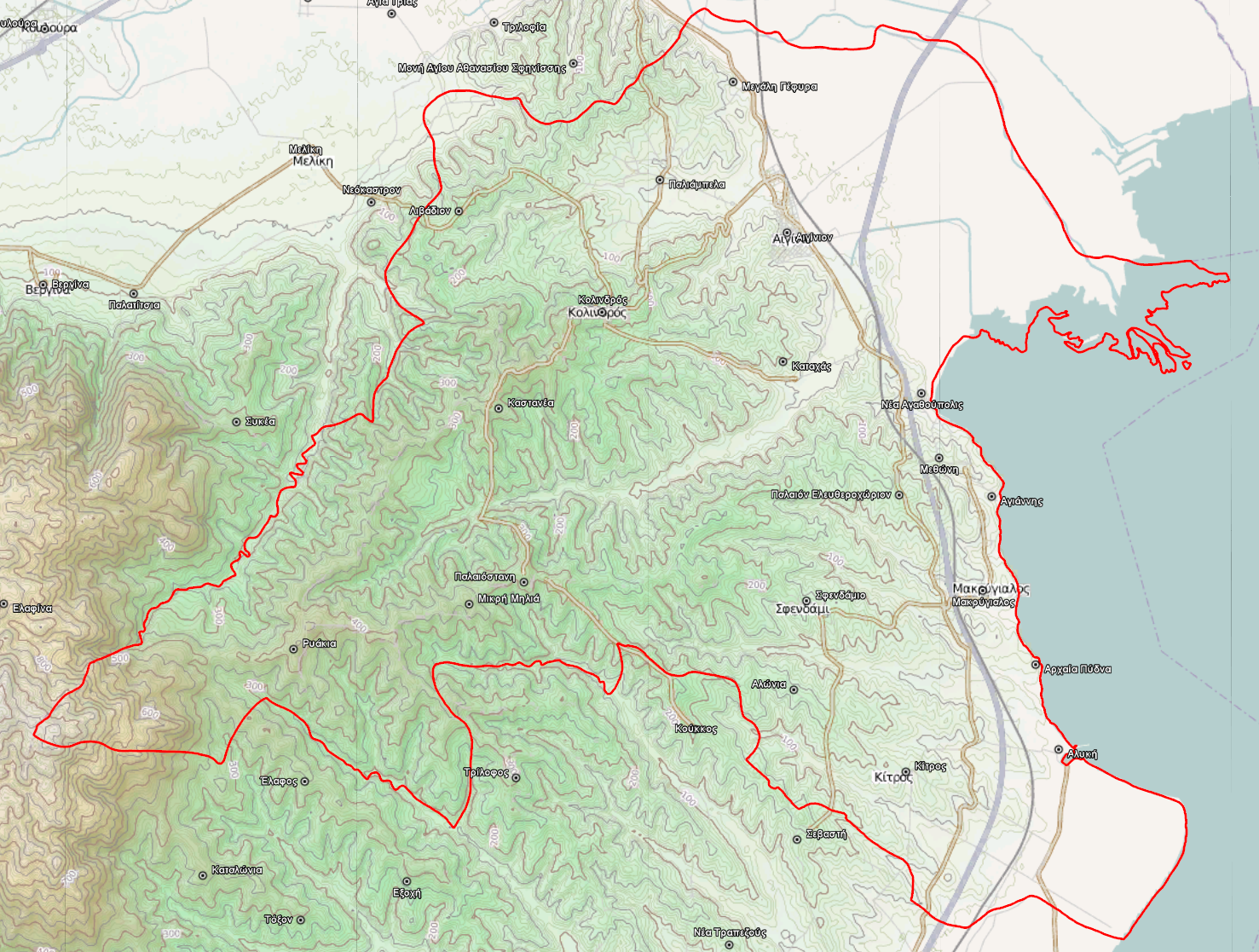
Pydna - Kolindros municipality map

The municipality Pydna–Kolindros was formed at the 2011 local government reform by the merger of the following 3 former municipalities, that became municipal units:

- Aiginio
- Kolindros
- Methoni
- Pydna

== See also ==
- Kitros
