= Philoxenus =

Philoxenus or Philoxenos (Greek for "lover of foreigners" or "hospitable") is the name of several prominent ancient Greeks:

- Philoxenus of Alexandria, an ancient Greek grammarian and linguist
- Philoxenus of Cythera, an ancient Greek dithyrambic poet
- Philoxenus of Leucas, a legendary glutton and poet
- Philoxenus Anicetus, an Indo-Greek king
- Philoxenus (general), a Macedonian general who was one of the Diadochi
- Philoxenus (physician), ancient Greek physician
- Philoxenus of Mabbug (d. 523), Syriac writer and proponent of Miaphysitism
- Philoxenus of Eretria, Hellenistic painter
