= Doric Greek =

Group of Ancient Greek dialects

- West Greek
- Region: Doris, Doric Hexapolis, Messenia, Laconia, Argolid, Aegina, Corinthia, Megara, Kythira, Milos, Thera, Crete, Karpathos, Elis, Locris, Phocis, Aetolia, Acarnania, Epirus, Upper Macedonia and possibly Lower Macedonia, most probably Achaea; Also, colonies of the aforementioned regions in Magna Graecia, Cyrenaica, Marmara sea, Black Sea, Ionian Sea and Adriatic Sea
- Era: c. 800 – c. 100 BC; evolved into the Tsakonian Greek
- Language family: Indo-European: Hellenic; Greek; Doric Greek
- Early form: Proto-Greek
- Dialects: Doric proper: Laconic; Argolic; Corinthian; Messenian; Cretan; Rhodian; Northwest Doric: Phocian; Locrian; Elean; Aetolian; Northwest Doric koine; Acarnanian; Epirote; (?) Ancient Macedonian; (?) Achaean Doric; (?) Achaean Doric Koine
- Writing system: Greek alphabet

Language codes
- ISO 639-3: –
- Glottolog: west2995 dori1248 nort3269
- Distribution of Greek dialects in Greece in the classical period. Western group: Doric proper; Northwest Doric; Achaean Doric (probably Northwest Doric); Central group: Aeolic; Arcado-Cypriot; Eastern group: Attic; Ionic; Distribution of Greek dialects in Magna Graecia (Southern Italy and Sicily) in the classical period. Western group: Doric proper; Northwest Doric; Achaean Doric (probably Northwest Doric); Eastern group: Attic-Ionic

Doric or Dorian, also known as West Greek, was a group of Ancient Greek dialects; its varieties are divided into the Doric proper and Northwest Doric subgroups. West Greek was spoken in a vast area of the ancient Greek world, covering much of Central Greece and Northern Greece, most of the Peloponnese, islands of the Southern Aegean (including Crete and Rhodes), as well as many Doric Greek colonies further afield. It was also spoken in the Greek sanctuaries of Dodona, Delphi, and Olympia, as well as at the four Panhellenic festivals; the Isthmian, Nemean, Pythian, and Olympic Games.

By Hellenistic times, under the Achaean League, an Achaean Doric koine appeared, exhibiting many peculiarities common to all Doric dialects, which delayed the spread of the Attic-based Koine Greek to the Peloponnese until the 2nd century BC.

The only living descendant of Doric is Tsakonian, an outlying dialect of Modern Greek that is still spoken in a small area on the southern Argolid coast of the Peloponnese, in the modern prefectures of Arcadia and Laconia. It is now critically endangered, with only a few hundred – mostly elderly – fluent speakers left. Tsakonian is the only modern Greek dialect not descended from Attic-Ionic, and is considered a likely descendant of Laconic Doric.

== Doric proper ==
=== Laconic ===
Laconic or Laconian was spoken by the population of Lacedaemon in the southern Peloponnese and also by its colonies, Taras and Herakleia in Magna Graecia. Sparta was the seat of ancient Laconia. Laconian is attested in inscriptions on pottery and stone from the seventh century BC. A dedication to Helen dates from the second quarter of the seventh century. Taras was founded in 706 and its founders must already have spoken Laconic. Many documents from the state of Sparta survive, whose citizens called themselves Lacedaemonians after the name of the valley in which they lived. Homer calls it "hollow Lacedaemon", though he refers to a pre-Dorian period. The seventh century Spartan poet Alcman used a dialect that some consider to be predominantly Laconian. Philoxenus of Alexandria wrote a treatise On the Laconian dialect.

=== Argolic ===
Argolic was spoken in the thickly settled northeast Peloponnese at, for example, Argos, Mycenae, Hermione, Troezen, Epidaurus, and as close to Athens as the island of Aegina. As Mycenaean Greek had been spoken in this dialect region in the Bronze Age, it is clear that the Dorians overran it but were unable to take Attica. The Dorians went on from Argos to Crete and Rhodes.

Ample inscriptional material of a legal, political and religious content exists from at least the sixth century BC.

=== Corinthian ===
Corinthian was spoken first in the isthmus region between the Peloponnesus and mainland Greece; that is, the Isthmus of Corinth. The cities and states of the Corinthian dialect region were Corinth, Sicyon, Archaies Kleones, Phlius, the colonies of Corinth in western Greece: Corcyra, Leucas, Anactorium, Ambracia and others, the colonies in and around Italy: Syracuse, Sicily and Ancona, and the colonies of Corcyra: Dyrrachium, and Apollonia. The earliest inscriptions at Corinth date from the early sixth century BC. They use a Corinthian epichoric alphabet. (See under Attic Greek.)

Corinth contradicts the prejudice that Dorians were rustic militarists, as some consider the speakers of Laconian to be. Positioned on an international trade route, Corinth played a leading part in the re-civilizing of Greece after the centuries of disorder and isolation following the collapse of Mycenaean Greece.

== Northwest Doric ==
The Northwest Doric or Northwest Greek (with Northwest Doric now considered more accurate so as not to distance the group from Doric proper) group is closely related to Doric proper. Whether it is to be considered a part of the southern Doric Group or the latter a part of it or the two considered subgroups of West Greek, the dialects and their grouping remain the same. West Thessalian and Boeotian had come under a strong Northwest Doric influence.

While Northwest Doric is generally seen as a dialectal group, dissenting views exist, such as that of Méndez-Dosuna, who argues that Northwest Doric is not a proper dialectal group but rather merely a case of areal dialectal convergence. Throughout the Northwest Doric area, most internal differences did not hinder mutual understanding, though Filos, citing Bubenik, notes that there were certain cases where a bit of accommodation may have been necessary.

The earliest epigraphic texts for Northwest Doric date to the 6th–5th century BC. These are thought to provide evidence for Northwest Doric features, especially the phonology and morphophonology, but most of the features thus attributed to Northwest Doric are not exclusive to it. The Northwest Doric dialects differ from the main Doric Group dialects in the below features:

1. Dative plural of the third declension in -οις (-ois) (instead of -σι (-si)): Ἀκαρνάνοις ἱππέοις Akarnanois hippeois for Ἀκαρνᾶσιν ἱππεῦσιν Akarnasin hippeusin (to the Acarnanian knights).
2. ἐν (en) + accusative (instead of εἰς (eis)): en Naupakton (into Naupactus).
3. -στ (-st) for -σθ (-sth): γενέσται genestai for genesthai (to become), μίστωμα mistôma for misthôma (payment for hiring).
4. ar for er: amara /Dor. amera/Att. hêmera (day), Elean wargon for Doric wergon and Attic ergon (work)
5. Dative singular in -oi instead of -ôi: τοῖ Ἀσκλαπιοῖ, Doric τῷ Ἀσκλαπιῷ, Attic Ἀσκληπιῷ (to Asclepius)
6. Middle participle in -eimenos instead of -oumenos

Four or five dialects of Northwestern Doric are recognised.

=== Phocian ===
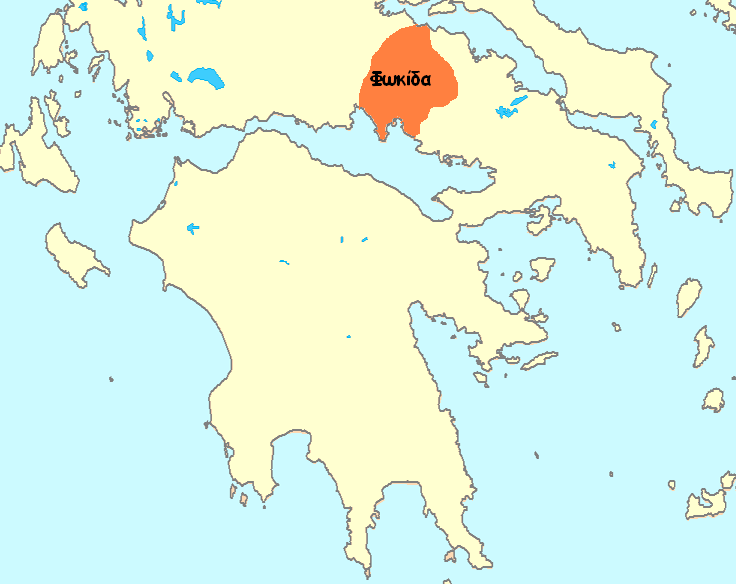
Ancient Phocis in Greece

This dialect was spoken in Phocis and in its main settlement of Delphi, where a local form known as the Delphian dialect was spoken. Plutarch says that Delphians pronounce b in the place of p (βικρὸν for πικρὸν).

=== Locrian ===
Locrian Greek is attested in two locations:

- Ozolian Locris, along the northwest coast of the Gulf of Corinth around Amfissa (earliest c. 500 BC);
- Opuntian Locris, on the coast of mainland Greece opposite northwest Euboea, around Opus.

=== Aetolian ===
The dialect of ancient Aetolia. Livy reports that Aetolians spoke the same language with Acarnanians and Macedonians. Thucydides claims that Eurytanes spoke a very difficult language and ate their food completely raw; they were described as semi-barbaric, warlike, and predatory.

==== Northwest Doric koine ====
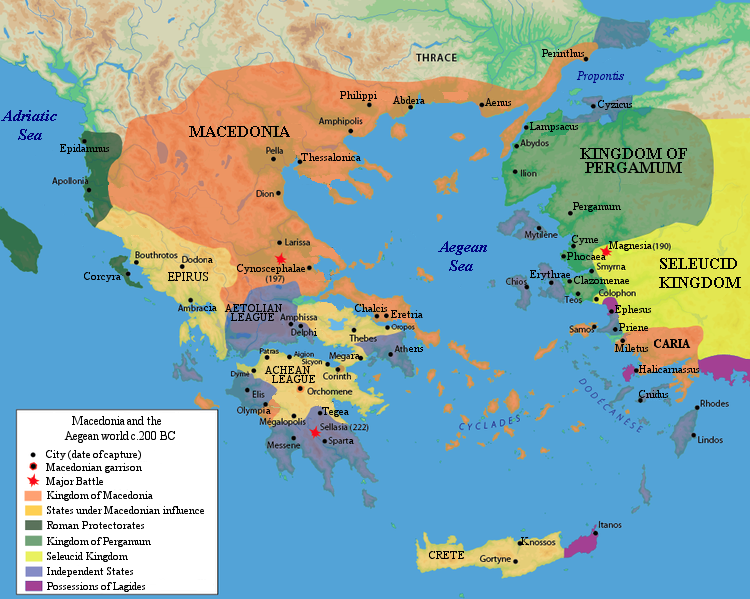
Political situation in the Greek world around the time at which the Northwest Doric koine arose

The Northwest Doric koine refers to a supraregional North-West common variety that emerged in the third and second centuries BC, and was used in the official texts of the Aetolian League. Such texts have been found in W. Locris, Phocis, and Phtiotis, among other sites. It contained a mix of native Northwest Doric dialectal elements and Attic forms. It was apparently based on the most general features of Northwest Doric, eschewing less common local traits.

Its rise was driven by both linguistic and non-linguistic factors, with non-linguistic motivating factors including the spread of the rival Attic-Ionic koine after it was recruited by the Macedonian state for administration, and the political unification of a vast territories by the Aetolian League and the state of Epirus. The Northwest Doric koine was thus both a linguistic and a political rival of the Attic-Ionic koine.

=== Acarnanian ===
The dialect of ancient Acarnania.

=== Epirote ===
Epirote Greek was spoken at the Dodona oracle, (earliest c. 550–500 BC) firstly under control of the Thesprotians; later organized in the Epirote League (since c. 370 BC) under the control of Molossians.

==== Upper Macedonian ====
In the region of Upper Macedonia, the tribes of Elimiotae, Orestae, Lyncestae, and Pelagones, were all Epirotic Molossian tribes and used the Northwest Greek dialect.

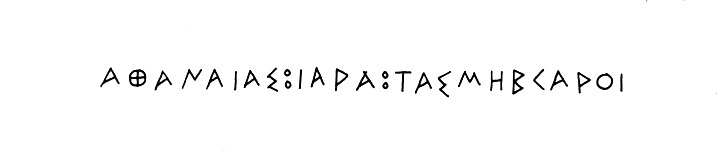
Reproduction of the inscription of Phiale of Megara, after L. H. Jeffery, The local scripts of archaic Greece (Oxford, 1961). Note the B-like glyph for E in the sixth letter from the right.

=== Ancient Macedonian ===
Ancient Macedonia up to the death of Philip II (r. 359 – 336 BC), showing the Upper and Lower divisions

Most scholars maintain that ancient Macedonian was a Greek dialect, probably of the Northwestern Doric group in particular. Olivier Masson, in his article for The Oxford Classical Dictionary, talks of "two schools of thought": one rejecting "the Greek affiliation of Macedonian" and preferring "to treat it as an Indo-European language of the Balkans" of contested affiliation (examples are Bonfante 1987, and Russu 1938); the other favouring "a purely Greek nature of Macedonian as a northern Greek dialect" with numerous adherents from the 19th century and on (Fick 1874; Hoffmann 1906; Hatzidakis 1897 etc.; Kalleris 1964 and 1976).

Masson himself argues with the largely Greek character of the Macedonian onomastics and sees Macedonian as "a Greek dialect, characterised by its marginal position and by local pronunciations" and probably most closely related to the dialects of the Greek North-West (Locrian, Aetolian, Phocidian, Epirote). Brian D. Joseph acknowledges the closeness of Macedonian to Greek (even contemplating to group them into a "Hellenic branch" of Indo-European), but retains that "[t]he slender evidence is open to different interpretations, so that no definitive answer is really possible". Johannes Engels has pointed to the Pella curse tablet, written in Doric Greek: "This has been judged to be the most important ancient testimony to substantiate that Macedonian was a north-western Greek and mainly a Doric dialect". Georgios Giannakis supports the view that recent scholarship has established the position of ancient Macedonian within the dialect map of North-West Greek. There has been some recent scholarly agreement, often expressed as cautious or tentative, that ancient Macedonian belongs to the Northwest Greek group.

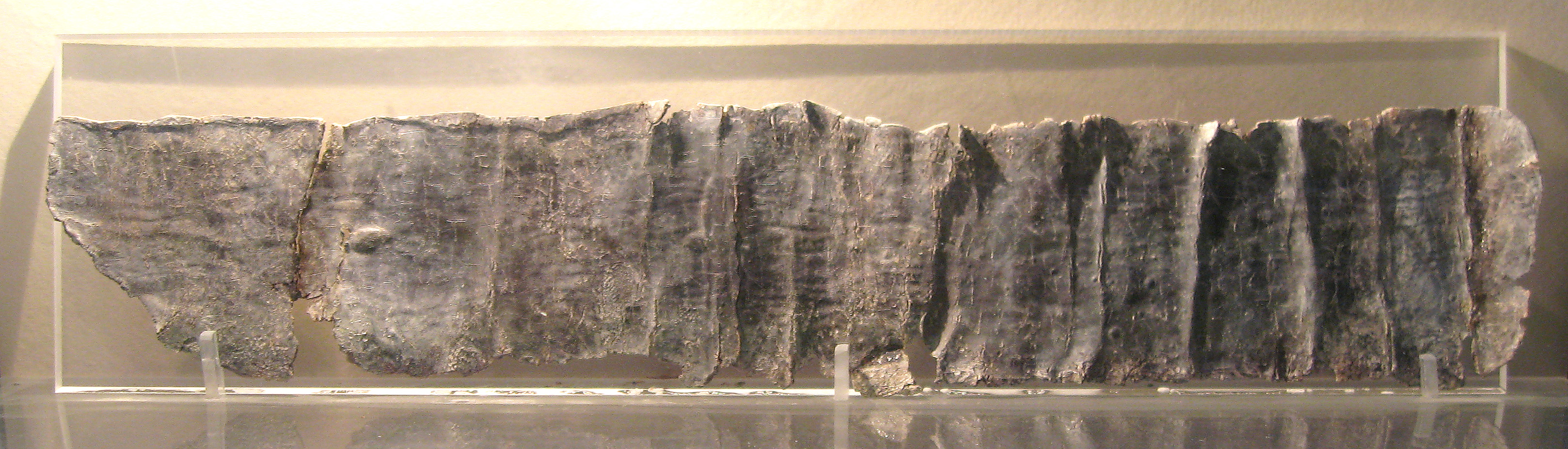
The Pella curse tablet at the Archaeological Museum of Pella

Miltiades Hatzopoulos has suggested that the Ancient Macedonian dialect of the 4th century BC, as attested in the Pella curse tablet, was a sort of Macedonian 'koine' resulting from the encounter of the idiom of the 'Aeolic'-speaking populations around Mount Olympus and the Pierian Mountains with the Northwest Greek-speaking Argead Macedonians hailing from Argos Orestikon, who founded the kingdom of Lower Macedonia. However, according to Hatzopoulos, B. Helly expanded and improved his own earlier suggestion and presented the hypothesis of a (North-)'Achaean' substratum extending as far north as the head of the Thermaic Gulf, which had a continuous relation, in prehistoric times both in Thessaly and Macedonia, with the Northwest Greek-speaking populations living on the other side of the Pindus mountain range, and contacts became cohabitation when the Argead Macedonians completed their wandering from Orestis to Lower Macedonia in the 7th c. BC. According to this hypothesis, Hatzopoulos concludes that the Ancient Macedonian Greek dialect of the historical period, which is attested in inscriptions such as the Pella curse tablet, is a sort of koine resulting from the interaction and the influences of various elements, the most important of which are the North-Achaean substratum, the Northwest Greek dialect of the Argead Macedonians, and the Thracian and Phrygian adstrata. Angelos Boufalis suggests that "several features can be established as local and most of them seem indeed to be shared with the NW Doric and/or the Thessalian dialect"; but also that "rather than a monolithic dialect throughout, different local or regional idioms may have had been spoken in this extensive geographical area".

=== Elean ===
The dialect of Elis (earliest c. 600 BC) is considered, after Aeolic Greek, one of the most difficult for the modern reader of epigraphic texts.

Eleans were labelled as the greatest barbarians (barbarotatoi) by musician Stratonicus of Athens.

And when he was once asked by someone who were the wickedest people, he said, "That in Pamphylia, the people of Phaselis were the worst; but that the Sidetae were the worst in the whole world." And when he was asked again, according to the account given by Hegesander, which were the greatest barbarians, the Boeotians or the Thessalians he said, "The Eleans."

In Hesychius's lexicon and other ancient lexica, Eleans are also listed as barbarophonoi ((βαρβαρόφωνοι)). Indeed, the North-West Doric dialect of Elis is, after the Aeolic dialects, one of the most difficult for the modern reader of epigraphic texts.

=== Achaean Doric ===
Achaean Doric most probably belonged to the Northwest Doric group. It was spoken in Achaea in the northwestern Peloponnese, on the islands of Cephalonia and Zakynthos in the Ionian Sea, and in the Achaean colonies of Magna Graecia in Southern Italy (including Sybaris and Crotone). This strict Doric dialect was later subject to the influence of mild Doric spoken in Corinthia. It survived until 350 BC.

==== Achaean Doric koine ====
By Hellenistic times, under the Achaean League, an Achaean Doric koine appeared, exhibiting many peculiarities common to all Doric dialects, which delayed the spread of the Attic-based Koine Greek to the Peloponnese until the 2nd century BC.

== Origin ==
It is widely accepted that Doric Greek originated in the mountains of Epirus in northwestern Greece, the original seat of the Dorians. It then expanded to all other regions and the colonisations that followed. The presence of a Doric state (Doris) in central Greece, north of the Gulf of Corinth, led to the theory that Doric had originated in northwest Greece or maybe beyond in the Balkans. The dialect's distribution towards the north extends to the Megarian colony of Byzantium and the Corinthian colonies of Potidaea, Epidamnos, Apollonia and Ambracia; there, it further added words to what would become the Albanian language, probably via traders from a now-extinct "Adriatic Illyrian" intermediary. In the north, local epigraphical evidence includes the decrees of the Epirote League, the Pella curse tablet, three additional lesser known Macedonian inscriptions (all of them identifiable as Doric), numerous inscriptions from a number of Greek colonies. Furthermore, there is an abundance of place names used to examine features of the northern Doric dialects. Southern dialects, in addition to numerous inscriptions, coins, and names, have also provided much more literary evidence through authors such as Alcman, Pindar, and Archimedes of Syracuse, among others, all of whom wrote in Doric. There are also ancient dictionaries that have survived; notably the one by Hesychius of Alexandria, whose work preserved many dialectal words from throughout the Greek-speaking world.

== Phonology ==
=== Vowels ===
==== Long a ====
Proto-Greek long *ā is retained as ā, in contrast to Attic developing a long open ē (eta) in at least some positions.

- Doric gā mātēr ~ Attic gē mētēr 'earth mother'

==== Compensatory lengthening of e and o ====
In certain Doric dialects (Severe Doric), *e and *o lengthen by compensatory lengthening or contraction to eta or omega, in contrast to Attic ei and ou (spurious diphthongs).

- Severe Doric -ō ~ Attic -ou (second-declension genitive singular)
- -ōs ~ -ous (second-declension accusative plural)
- -ēn ~ -ein (present, second aorist infinitive active)

==== Contraction of a and e ====
Contraction: Proto-Greek *ae > Doric ē (eta) ~ Attic ā.

==== Synizesis ====
Proto-Greek *eo, *ea > some Doric dialects' io, ia.

==== Proto-Greek *a ====
Proto-Greek short *a > Doric short a ~ Attic e in certain words.

- Doric hiaros, Artamis ~ Attic hieros 'holy', Artemis

=== Consonants ===
==== Proto-Greek *-ti ====
Proto-Greek *-ti is retained (assibilated to -si in Attic).

- Doric phāti ~ Attic phēsi 'he says' (3rd sing. pres. of athematic verb)
- legonti ~ legousi 'they say' (3rd pl. pres. of thematic verb)
- wīkati ~ eikosi 'twenty'
- triākatioi ~ triākosioi 'three hundred'

==== Proto-Greek *ts ====
Proto-Greek *ts > -ss- between vowels. (Attic shares the same development, but further shortens the geminate to -s-.)

- Proto-Greek *métsos > Doric messos ~ Attic mesos 'middle' (from Proto-Indo-European *médʰyos, compare Latin medius, Sanskrit madhya)

==== Digamma ====
Initial *w (ϝ) is preserved in earlier Doric (lost in Attic).

- Doric woikos ~ Attic oikos 'house' (from Proto-Indo-European *weyḱ-, *woyḱ-, compare Latin vīcus 'village')

Literary texts in Doric and inscriptions from the Hellenistic age have no digamma.

=== Accentuation ===
For information on the peculiarities of Doric accentuation, see Ancient Greek accent § Doric.

== Morphology ==
Cardinal: Doric τέτορες (tetores) "four" ~ Attic τέτταρες (tettares), Ionic τέσσερες (tesseres)

Ordinal: Doric πρᾶτος (prātos) "first" ~ Attic/Ionic πρῶτος (prōtos)

Demonstrative pronoun: Doric τῆνος (tēnos) "this" ~ Attic/Ionic (ἐ)κεῖνος ((e)keinos)

t for h (from Proto-Indo-European s) in the definite article and medial demonstrative pronoun.

- Doric τοί, ταί; τοῦτοι, ταῦται (toi, tai; toutoi, tautai) ~ Attic/Ionic οἱ, αἱ; οὗτοι, αὗται (hoi, hai; houtoi, hautai)

Third person plural, athematic or root aorist -n ~ Attic -san

- Doric ἔδον (edon) "they gave" ~ Attic/Ionic ἔδοσᾰν (edosan)

First person plural active -mes ~ Attic/Ionic -men

- Doric δίδομες (dídomes) "we give" ~ Attic δίδομεν (dídomen)

Future stem -se- ~ Attic -s-

- πραξῆται (prāxētai) "he will do" ~ Attic/Ionic πράξεται (prāxetai)

Modal particle κᾰ (kă) ~ Attic/Ionic ἄν (an)

- Doric αἴκα, αἴκα δέ, αἴκα τίς (aika, aika de, aika tis) ~ Attic ἐάν, ἐὰν δέ, ἐάν τις (ean, ean de, ean tis)
  - αἴκα = αἰ + κᾰ
  - ἐάν = εἰ + ἄν

=== Adverbs ===
Temporal adverbs in -κα ~ Attic/Ionic -τε

- Doric ὅκᾰ (hókă) "when" ~ Attic ὅτε (hóte)
  - ὅκκᾰ = ὅκα + κᾰ; ὅκα = ὁδ + κᾰ
  - ὅταν = ὅτε + ἄν
- Doric τόκα (tóka) "at that time" ~ Attic τότε (tóte)

Locative adverbs in -ει ~ Attic/Koine -ου

- Doric εἷ, τηνεῖ, πεῖ, τεῖδε (heî, tēneî, peî, teîde) "where", "there", "where?", "hither" ~ Attic οὗ, ἐκεῖ, ποῦ, ἐνθάδε (hoû, ekeî, poû, entháde)
- Doric τᾷδε, πᾳ, ἅμα (tāîde, pai, háma) "here", "somehow", "together" ~ Attic τῇδε, πῃ, ὁμοῦ (tēîde, pēî, homoû)

=== Future/Aorist tense ===
The aorist and future stem of verbs in -izō, -azō has x (versus Attic/Koine s).

- Doric ἀγωνίξατο (agōnixato) ~ Attic ἠγωνίσατο (ēgōnísato) 'he contended' (3rd singular aorist middle indicative of ἀγωνίζομαι)

Similarly k before suffixes beginning with t.

== Glossary ==
=== Common ===
- αἰγάδες aigades (Attic αἶγες aiges) "goats"
- αἶγες aiges (Attic κύματα kymata) "waves"
- ἁλία halia (Attic ἐκκλησία ekklēsia) "assembly" (cf. Heliaia)
- βρύκαιναι brykainai (Attic ἱέρειαι hiereiai) "priestesses"
- βρυκετός bryketos (Attic βρυγμός brygmos, βρυκηθμός brykēthmos) "chewing, grinding, gnashing with the teeth"
- δαμιοργοί damiorgoi (Attic ἄρχοντες archontes) "high officials". Cf. Attic δημιουργός dēmiourgos "public worker for the people (dēmos), craftsman, creator"; Hesychius δαμιουργοί· αἱ πόρναι "prostitutes". Elean: Ζαμιουργοί Zamiourgoi.
- Ἐλωός Elōos – epithet of Hephaestus (Ἥφαιστος παρὰ Δωριεῦσιν)
- κάρρων karrōn (Attic κρείττων kreittōn; Ionic kreissōn; Cretan kartōn) "stronger"
- κορύγης korygēs (Attic κῆρυξ kēryx; Aeolic karoux) "herald, messenger"
- λαιός laios (Homeric, Attic, and Modern Greek ἀριστερός aristeros) "left". Cretan: λαία laia; Attic ἀσπίς aspis "shield"; Hesychius: λαῖφα laipha, λαίβα laiba – because the shield was held with the left hand. Cf. Latin laevus.
- λαία laia (Attic, Modern Greek λεία leia) "prey"
- λέω (λείω) leiō (Attic ἐθέλω ethelō) "will"
- οἴνωτρος oinōtros "vine pole" (cf. Greek οἶνος oinos "wine"; see Oenotrus)
- μογίοντι mogionti (Ionic πυρέσσουσι pyressousi) "they are on fire, have fever" (= Attic μογοῦσι mogousi "they suffer, take pains to")
- μυρμηδόνες Myrmēdones (Attic μύρμηκες myrmēkes) "ants" (cf. Myrmidons)
- ὄπτιλλος optillos or optilos "eye" (Attic ὀφθαλμός ophthalmos; Latin oculus; cf. Attic ὀπτικός optikos "of sight", source of "optics")
- πάομαι paomai (Attic κτάομαι ktaomai) "acquire"
- ῥαπιδοποιός rhapidopoios "poet, broiderer, pattern-weaver, boot-maker" (from rhapis "needle"; cf. Attic rhaphis)
- σκανά skana (Attic σκηνή skēnē "tent, stage, scene"; Homeric klisiē; Doric skanama "encampment")
- τανθαλύζειν tanthalyzein (Attic τρέμειν tremein) "to tremble"
- τύνη tunē or tounē "you" (nominative; Attic σύ sy); dative: τέειν teein (Attic σοί soi)
- χανάκτιον chanaktion (Attic μωρόν mōron) "foolish"; cf. χάν chan "goose"

=== Doric proper ===
==== Argolic ====
- Βαλλακράδες Ballakrádes – title of Argive athletes on a feast-day (Cf. achras 'wild pear-tree'
- Δαυλίς Daulís – mimic festival at Argos (acc. Pausanias 10.4.9; daulis means 'thicket') (Hes. daulon 'fire log')
- δροόν droón (Attic ἰσχυρόν ischyron, δύνατον dynaton) – strong
- κέστερ késter (Attic νεανίας neanias) – youngman
- κυλλάραβις kyllárabis – discus and gymnasium at Argos
- σεμαλία semalía (Attic ῥάκη rhakē, cf. ἱμάτια himatia) – ragged, tattered garments
- ὤβεα ôbea (Attic ὠά ôa) – eggs

==== Cretan ====
- ἀγέλα agela – "group of boys in the Cretan agōgē" (Cf. Homeric Greek ἀγέλη agelē "herd") (Cretan apagelos not yet received in agelê, boy under 17)
- ἀδνός adnos – "holy, pure" (Attic ἁγνός hagnos) (Ariadne)
- ἀϝτὸς awtos (Attic αὐτός autos) – Hsch. aus αὐς - αὐτός. Κρῆτες καὶ Λάκωνες
- ἄκαρα akara – "legs" (Attic σκέλη skelê)
- ἁμάκις hamakis – "once" (Attic ἅπαξ hapax)
- ἄργετος argetos – juniper, cedar (Attic ἄρκευθος arkeuthos)
- αὐκά auka – "power" (Attic ἀλκή alkê)
- ἀφραττίας aphrattias – "strong"
- βαλικιῶται balikiôtai – Koine synepheboi (Attic ἡλικιῶται hēlikiôtai "age-peers" of the same age ἡλικία hēlikia)
- βριτύ britu – "sweet" (Attic γλυκύ glyku)
- δαμιόω damioô – Cretan and Boeotian for Attic ζημιόω zêmioô "to damage, punish, harm"
- δαμπόν dampon – first milk curdled by heating over embers (Attic πυριέφθων puriephthon, πυριάτη puriatê)
- δῶλα dôla – "ears" (Attic ὦτα ôta) (Tarentine ἀτα ata)
- Ϝέλχανος Welchanos – for Cretan Zeus and Welchanios, Belchanos, Gelchanos (Elchanios Κνωσός Cnossus month)
- ϝεργάδδομαι wergaddomai – "I work" (Attic ἐργάζομαι ergazomai)
- ϝῆμα wêma – "garment" (Attic ἕιμα heima; Aeolic ἔμμα emma; Koine ἱμάτιον himmation)
- ἰβῆν ibên – "wine" (Dialectal ϝοἶνος woînos; Attic οἶνος oinos; accusative ἰβῆνα ibêna)
- ἴττον itton – "one" (Attic ἕν hen)
- καρανώ karanô – "goat"
- ϙόσμος kosmos – in Crete, used of the body of archontes; Attic κόσμος kosmos = "order, ornament, honour, world"; kormos = "trunk of a tree"
- κύφερον, κυφή kypheron, kuphê – "head" (Attic κεφαλή kephalê)
- λάκος lakos – "rag, tattered garment" (Attic ῥάκος rhakos; Aeolic βράκος brakos "long robe")
- μαλκενίς malkenis – (Attic παρθένος parthenos; Hsch: malakinnês)
- ὄθρυν othryn – "mountain" (Attic ὄρος oros) (Cf. Othrys)
- ῥυστόν rhyston – "spear"
- σεῖφα seipha – "darkness" (Attic ζόφος zophos, σκοτία skotia; Aeolic δνόφος dnophos)
- σπεῦσδος speusdos – "title of Cretan officer" (Cf. σπεύδω speudô "rush")
- τάγανα tagana – "these things" (Attic ταῦτα tauta)
- τίρος tiros – "summer" (Homeric, Attic θέρος theros)
- τρέ tre (probably τϝέ twe) – "you", accusative (Attic σέ se)

==== Laconian ====
- ἀβήρ abêr storeroom οἴκημα στοὰς ἔχον, ταμεῖον Λάκωνες
- ἀϝώρ awôr dawn (Attic ἠώς êôs) (Latin aurora)
- ἄδδα adda need, deficiency (Attic endeia) Aristophanes of Byzantium(fr. 33)
- ἀδδαυόν addauon dry (i.e. azauon) or addanon (Attic xêron)
- αἴκουδα aikouda (Attic aischunē) αἰσχύνη. Λάκωνες
- αἵματία haimatia blood-broth, Spartan Melas Zomos Black soup) (haima haimatos blood)
- ἀΐτας aïtas (Attic ἐρώμενος erōmenos) "beloved boy (in a pederastic relationship)"
- ἀκκόρ akkor tube, bag (Attic askos)
- ἀκχαλίβαρ akchalibar bed (Attic skimpous)(Koine krabbatos)
- ἀμβροτίξας ambrotixas having begun, past participle(amphi or ana..+ ?) (Attic aparxamenos, aparchomai) (Doric -ixas for Attic -isas)
- ἀμπέσσαι ampesai (Attic amphiesai) to dress
- ἀπαβοίδωρ apaboidôr out of tune (Attic ekmelôs) (Cf.Homeric singer Aoidos) / emmelôs, aboidôr in tune
- Ἀπέλλα apella (Attic ἐκκλησία ekklēsia) "assembly in Sparta" (verb apellazein)
- ἀρβυλίς arbylis (Attic ἀρύβαλλος aryballos) (Hesychius: ἀρβυλίδα λήκυθον. Λάκωνες)
- Ἄρταμις Ártamis (Attic Ἄρτεμις Ártemis)
- ἄττασι attasi wake up, get up (Attic anastêthi)
- βάβαλον babalon imperative of cry aloud, shout (Attic kraugason)
- βάγαρον bagaron (Attic χλιαρόν chliaron 'warm') (Cf. Attic φώγω phōgō 'roast') (Laconian word)
- βαφά bapha broth (Attic zômos) (Attic βαφή baphê dipping of red-hot iron in water (Koine and Modern Greek βαφή vafi dyeing)
- ϝείκατι weikati twenty (Attic εἴκοσι eikosi)
- βέλα bela sun and dawn Laconian (Attic helios Cretan abelios)
- βερνώμεθα bernômetha Attic klêrôsômetha we will cast or obtain by lot (inf. berreai) (Cf.Attic meiresthai receive portion, Doric bebramena for heimarmenê, allotted by Moirai)
- βέσκερος beskeros bread (Attic artos)
- βήλημα bêlêma hindrance, river dam (Laconian)
- βηρίχαλκον bêrichalkon fennel (Attic marathos) (chalkos bronze)
- βίβασις bibasis Spartan dance for boys and girls
- βίδυοι bidyoi bideoi, bidiaioi also "officers in charge of the ephebes at Sparta"
- βίὡρ biôr almost, maybe (Attic ἴσως isôs, σχεδόν schedon) wihôr (ϝίὡρ)
- βλαγίς blagis spot (Attic kêlis)
- βοῦα boua "group of boys in the Spartan agōgē"
- βο(υ)αγός bo(u)agos "leader of a boua at Sparta"
- βυλλίχης bullichês Laconian dancer (Attic orchêstês)
- βώνημα bônêma speech (Homeric, Ionic eirêma eireo) (Cf.Attic phônêma sound, speech)
- γαβεργόρ gabergor labourer (ga earth wergon work) (Cf.geôrgos farmer)
- γαιάδας gaiadas citizens, people (Attic dêmos)
- γονάρ gonar mother Laconian (gonades children Eur. Med. 717)
- δαβελός dabelos torch (Attic dalos)(Syracusan daelos, dawelos)(Modern Greek davlos) (Laconian δαβῇ dabêi (Attic kauthêi) it should be burnt)
- δίζα diza goat (Attic aix) and Hera aigophagos Goat-eater in Sparta
- εἴρην eirēn (Attic ἔφηβος ephēbos) "Spartan youth who has completed his 12th year"
- εἰσπνήλας eispnēlas (Attic ἐραστής erastēs) one who inspires love, a lover (Attic eispneô inhale, breathe)
- ἐξωβάδια exôbadia (Attic enôtia; ôta ears)
- ἔφοροι ephoroi (Attic ἔφοροι ἄρχοντες archontes) "high officials at Sparta". Cf. Attic ἔφορος ephoros "overseer, guardian"
- Θοράτης Thoratês Apollon thoraios containing the semen, god of growth and increase
- θρῶναξ thrônax drone (Attic kêphên)
- κάφα kapha washing, bathing-tub (Attic loutêr) (Cf.skaphê basin, bowl)
- κελοῖα keloia (kelya, kelea also) "contest for boys and youths at Sparta"
- κίρα kirafox (Attic alôpêx) (Hsch kiraphos).
- μεσόδμα mesodma, messodoma woman and ἀνθρωπώ anthrôpô (Attic gunê)
- μυρταλίς myrtalis Butcher's broom (Attic oxumursinê) (Myrtale real name of Olympias)
- πάσορ pasor passion (Attic pathos)
- πόρ por leg, foot (Attic pous)
- πούρδαιν pourdain restaurant (Koine mageirion) (Cf.purdalon, purodansion (from pyr fire hence pyre)
- σαλαβάρ salabar cook (Common Doric/Attic mageiros)
- σίκα sika 'pig' (Attic hus) and grôna female pig.
- σιρία siria safeness (Attic asphaleia)
- ψιθωμίας psithômias ill, sick (Attic asthenês) Λάκωνες τὸν ἀσθενῆ
- ψιλάκερ psilaker first dancer
- ὠϝά, ὠβά ôba (Attic κώμη kōmē) "village; one of five quarters of the city of Sparta"

==== Magna Graecia's Doric ====
- ἀστύξενοι astyxenoi Metics, Tarentine
- βάννας bannas king basileus, wanax, anax
- βειλαρμοσταὶ beilarmostai cavalry officers Tarentine (Attic ilarchai) (ilē, squadron + Laconian harmost-)
- δόστορε dostore 'you make' Tarentine (Attic ποιεῖτε)
- Θαύλια Thaulia "festival of Tarentum", θαυλακίζειν thaulakizein 'to demand sth with uproar' Tarentine, θαυλίζειν thaulizein "to celebrate like Dorians", Θαῦλος Thaulos "Macedonian Ares", Thessalian Ζεὺς Θαύλιος Zeus Thaulios, Athenian Ζεὺς Θαύλων Zeus Thaulon, Athenian family Θαυλωνίδαι Thaulonidai
- ῥάγανον rhaganon easy Thuriian (Attic rhaidion) (Aeolic braidion)
- σκύτας skytas 'back-side of neck' (Attic trachēlos)
- τήνης tênês till Tarentine (Attic ἕως heôs)
- τρυφώματα tryphômata whatever are fed or nursed, children, cattle (Attic thremmata)
- ὑετίς huetis jug, amphora Tarentine (Attic hydris, hydria)(huetos rain)

=== Northwest Greek ===
==== Delphic ====
- δείλομαι deilomai will, want Locrian, Delphian(Attic boulomai) (Coan dêlomai) (Doric bôlomai) (Thessalian belloumai)
- ϝαργάνα Wargana female worker epithet for Athena (Delphic) (Attic Erganê) (Attic ergon work, Doric Wergon, Elean ϝάργον wargon

==== Locrian ====
- ϝέρρω Werrô go away Locrian (Attic errô) (Hsch. berrês fugitive, berreuô escape)
- Ϝεσπάριοι Λοϙροὶ Wesparioi Lokroi Epizephyrian (Western) Locrians (Attic hesperios of evening, western, Doric wesperios) (cf. Latin Vesper)
- ὀπλίαι opliai places where the Locrians counted their cattle

==== Elean ====
- ἀϝλανέο̄ς awlaneôs without fraud, honestly IvO7 (Attic adolôs)(Hsch.alanes true)(Tarentinian alaneôs absolutely)
- ἀμίλλυξ amillux scythe (Attic drepanon) in accus. ἀμίλλυκα (Boeotian amillakas wine)
- ἀττάμιος attamios unpunished (Attic azêmios) from an earliest addamios (cf.Cretan, Boeotian damioô punish)
- βάβακοι babakoi cicadas Elean (Attic tettiges) (in Pontus babakoi frogs)
- βαίδειος baideios ready (Attic hetoimos) (heteos fitness)
- βενέοι beneoi Elean
- βορσός borsos pole, stake (Attic stauros)
- βρα bra brothers, brotherhood (Cf.Attic phratra)
- βρατάνα bratana ladle (Attic torune) (Doric rhatana) (cf. Aeolic bradanizô brandish, shake off)
- δειρῆται deirêtai small birds (Macedonian δρῆες drêes or δρῆγες drêges) (Attic strouthoi) (Hsc. trikkos small bird and king by Eleans)
- ϝράτρα wratra law, contract (Attic rhetra)
- σερός seros yesterday (Attic chthes)
- στερχανά sterchana funeral feast (Attic perideipnon)
- φίλαξ philax young oak (Macedonian ilax, Latin ilex (Laconian dilax ariocarpus, sorbus)(Modern Cretan azilakas Quercus ilex)
- φόρβυτα phorbuta gums (Attic oula) (Homeric pherbô feed, eat)

==== Aetolian ====
- ἀγρίδιον agridion 'village' Aetolian (Attic chôrion)(Hesychius text: *ἀγρίδιον κωμάριον, χωρίον vA [παρὰ Αἰτωλοῖς] dim. of agros countryside, field)
- ἀερία aeria fog Aetolian (Attic omichlê, aêr air)(Hsch.ἀερία ὀμίχλη, παρὰ Αἰτωλοῖς.)
- κίββα kibba wallet, bag Aetolian (Attic πήρα pêra) (Cypr. kibisis) (Cf.Attic κιβωτός kibôtos ark kibôtion box Suid. cites kibos)

==== Acarnanian ====
- πλήτομον plêtomon Acarnanian old, ancient (Attic palaion,palaiotaton very old)

==== Epirote ====
- ἀγχωρίξαντας anchôrixantas having transferred, postponed Chaonian (Attic metapherô, anaballô) (anchôrizo anchi near +horizô define and Doric x instead of Attic s) (Cf. Ionic anchouros neighbouring) not to be confused with Doric anchôreô Attic ana-chôreô go back, withdraw.
- ἀκαθαρτία akathartia impurity (Attic/Doric akatharsia) (Lamelles Oraculaires 14)
- ἀποτράχω apotrachô run away (Attic/Doric apotrechô)
- ἄσπαλοι aspaloi fishes Athamanian (Attic ichthyes) (Ionic chlossoi) (Cf.LSJ aspalia angling, aspalieus fisherman, aspalieuomai I angle metaph. of a lover, aspalisai: halieusai, sagêneusai. (hals sea)
- Ἄσπετος Aspetos divine epithet of Achilles in Epirus (Homeric aspetos 'unspeakable, unspeakably great, endless' (Aristotle F 563 Rose; Plutarch, Pyrrhus 1; SH 960,4)
- γνώσκω gnôskô know (Attic γιγνώσκω gignôskô) (Ionic/Koine ginôskô) (Latin nōsco)(Attic gnôsis, Latin notio knowledge) (ref.Orion p. 42.17)
- διαιτός diaitos (Hshc. judge kritês) (Attic diaitêtês arbitrator) Lamelles Oraculaires 16
- ἐσκιχρέμεν eskichremen lend out πὲρ τοῖ ἀργύρροι (Lamelles Oraculaires 8 of Eubandros) (Attic eis + inf. kichranai from chraomai use)
- ϝεῖδυς weidus knowing (Doric ϝειδώς) weidôs) (Elean ϝειζός weizos) (Attic εἰδώς) eidôs) (PIE *weid- "to know, to see", Sanskrit veda I know) Cabanes, L'Épire 577,50
- κάστον kaston wood Athamanian (Attic xylon from xyô scrape, hence xyston); Sanskrit kāṣṭham ("wood, timber, firewood") (Dialectical kalon wood, traditionally derived from kaiô burn kauston sth that can be burnt, kausimon fuel)
- λῃτῆρες lêïtêres Athamanian priests with garlands Hes.text ἱεροὶ στεφανοφόροι. Ἀθαμᾶνες(LSJ: lêitarchoi public priests ) (hence Leitourgia
- μανύ manu small Athamanian (Attic mikron, brachu) (Cf. manon rare) (PIE *men- small, thin) (Hsch. banon thin) ( manosporos thinly sown manophullos with small leaves Thphr.HP7.6.2–6.3)
- Νάϊος Naios or Naos epithet of Dodonaean Zeus (from the spring in the oracle) (cf. Naiades and Pan Naios in Pydna SEG 50:622 (Homeric naô flow, Attic nama spring) (PIE *sna-)
- παγάομαι pagaomai 'wash in the spring' (of Dodona) (Doric paga Attic pêgê running water, fountain)
- παμπασία pampasia (to ask peri pampasias cliché phrase in the oracle) (Attic pampêsia full property) (Doric paomai obtain)
- Πελιγᾶνες Peliganes or Peligones (Epirotan, Macedonian senators)
- πρᾶμι prami do optative (Attic πράττοιμι prattoimi) Syncope (Lamelles Oraculaires 22)
- τίνε tine (Attic/Doric tini) to whom (Lamelles Oraculaires 7)
- τριθυτικόν trithutikon triple sacrifice tri + thuo(Lamelles Oraculaires 138)

==== Ancient Macedonian ====
- ἀρφύς arhphys (Attic ἁρπεδών harpedôn cord, yarn)
- βάγαρον bagaron (Attic χλιαρόν chliaron' 'warm') (cf. Attic phôgô 'roast') (Laconian)
- βώνημα bônêma speech (Homeric, Ionic eirêma eireo) (cf. Attic phônêma sound, speech) (Laconian)
- κεβλὴ keblê Callimachus Fr.140 Macedonian κεβ(α)λή keb(a)lē versus Attic κεφαλή kephalē ('head')
- κεβλήπυρις keblēpyris ('red-cap bird'), (Aristophanes Birds)
- κεβλήγονος keblêgonos born from the head, Euphorion 108 for Athena, with its seed in its head Nicander Alexipharmaca 433.
- πέχαρι pechari deer (Laconian berkios) Amerias
- Ὑπερβέρετος Hyperberetos Cretan month June, Macedonian September Hyperberetaios (Hellenic Calendars)
- δάνος dánοs ('death', from PIE *d^{h}enh₂- 'to leave'), compared to Attic θάνατος thánatos
- ἀβροῦτες abroûtes or ἀβροῦϝες abroûwes, compared to Attic ὀφρῦς ophrûs for 'eyebrows'
- Βερενίκη Bereníkē, compared to Attic Φερενίκη Phereníkē, 'bearing victory' (Personal name)
- ἄδραια adraia ('bright weather'), compared to Attic αἰθρία aithría, from PIE *h₂aid^{h}-
- βάσκιοι báskioi ('fasces'), compared to Attic φάσκωλος pháskōlos 'leather sack', from PIE *b^{h}asko
- μάγειρος mágeiros ('butcher') was a loan from Doric into Attic. Vittore Pisani has suggested an ultimately Macedonian origin for the word, which could then be cognate to μάχαιρα mákhaira ('knife', < PIE *mag^{h}-, 'to fight')
- According to Herodotus 7.73 (c. 440 BC), the Macedonians claimed that the Phryges were called Bryges before they migrated from Thrace to Anatolia (around 8th–7th century BC).
- According to Plutarch, Moralia Macedonians use 'b' instead of 'ph', while Delphians use 'b' in the place of 'p'.

==== Achaean Doric ====
- καιρότερον kairoteron (Attic: ἐνωρότερον enôroteron) "earlier" (kairos time, enôros early cf. Horae)
- κεφαλίδας kephalidas (Attic: κόρσαι korsai) "sideburns" (kephalides was also an alternative for epalxeis 'bastions' in Greek proper)
- σιαλίς sialis (Attic: βλέννος blennos) (cf. blennorrhea) slime, mud (Greek sialon or sielon saliva, modern Greek σάλιο salio)

== See also ==
- Griko language
- Gortyn Code
