= A- =

A- or a- may refer to:

== A-hyphen ==
- A- (plane), a U.S. military aircraft prefix
- Privative a, a prefix expressing negation
- Copulative a, a prefix expressing unification

== A-minus ==
- A−, a blood type
- A− (grade), an educational grade in the letter-grading system, above B+ but below A

== See also ==
- Ā
