= Ancient Greek dialects =

Varieties of Ancient Greek in classical antiquity

Ancient Greek in classical antiquity, before the development of the common Koine Greek of the Hellenistic period, was divided into several varieties. Most of these varieties are known only from inscriptions, but a few of them, principally Aeolic, Doric, and Ionic, are also represented in the literary canon alongside the dominant Attic form of literary Greek. Likewise, Modern Greek is divided into several dialects, most derived from Koine Greek.

Greek territories and colonies in the Archaic period

== Provenance ==
- The earliest known Greek dialect is Mycenaean Greek, the South/Eastern Greek variety attested from the Linear B tablets produced by the Mycenaean civilization of the Late Bronze Age in the late 2nd millennium BC. The classical distribution of dialects was brought about by the migrations of the early Iron Age (Note: Sometimes called the Greek Dark Ages because writing disappeared from Greece until the adaptation of the Phoenician alphabet.) after the collapse of the Mycenaean civilization. Some speakers of Mycenaean were displaced to Cyprus while others remained inland in Arcadia, giving rise to the Arcadocypriot dialect. This is the only dialect with a known Bronze-Age precedent. The other dialects must have preceded their attested forms but the relationship of the precedents to Mycenaean remains to be discovered.
- Aeolic was spoken in three subdialects: one, Lesbian, on the island of Lesbos and the west coast of Asia Minor north of Smyrna. The other two, Boeotian and Thessalian, were spoken in the northeast of the Greek mainland (in Boeotia and Thessalia).
- Doric Greek spread from a probable location in northwestern Greece to the coast of the Peloponnesus; for example, to Sparta, to Crete and to the southernmost parts of the west coast of Asia Minor. Northwest Greek, also called Northwest Doric, is sometimes classified as a separate dialect, and is sometimes subsumed under Doric. Ancient Macedonian is regarded by most scholars as another Greek dialect related to Northwest Greek.
- Ionic was mostly spoken along the west coast of Asia Minor, including Smyrna and the area to the south of it, but also in Euboea. Homer's Iliad and Odyssey were written in Homeric Greek (or Epic Greek), an early East Greek blending Ionic and Aeolic features. Attic Greek, a sub- or sister-dialect of Ionic, was for centuries the language of Athens. Because Attic was adopted in Macedon before the conquests of Alexander the Great and the subsequent rise of Hellenism, it became the "standard" dialect that evolved into Koine.

== Literature ==
Ancient Greek literature is written in literary dialects that developed from particular regional or archaic dialects. Ancient Greek authors did not necessarily write in their native dialect, but rather chose a dialect that was suitable or traditional for the type of literature they were writing (see belles-lettres). All dialects have poetry written in them, but only Attic and Ionic have full works of prose attested.

Homeric Greek is used in the first epic poems, the Iliad and the Odyssey, and the Homeric Hymns, traditionally attributed to Homer and written in dactylic hexameter. Homeric is a literary dialect with elements of Ionic, Aeolic and Arcadocypriot. Hesiod uses a similar dialect, and later writers imitate Homer in their epics, such as Apollonius Rhodius in Argonautica and Nonnus in Dionysiaca. Homer influenced other types of poetry as well.

Ionic proper is first used in Archilochus of Paros. This dialect includes also the earliest Greek prose, that of Heraclitus and Ionic philosophers, Hecataeus and logographers, Herodotus, Democritus, and Hippocrates. Elegiac poetry originated in Ionia and always continued to be written in Ionic.

Doric is the conventional dialect of choral lyric poetry, which includes the Laconian Alcman, the Theban Pindar and the choral songs of Attic tragedy (stasima). Several lyric and epigrammatic poets wrote in this dialect, such as Ibycus of Rhegium and Leonidas of Tarentum. The following authors wrote in Doric, preserved in fragments: Epicharmus comic poet and writers of South Italian Comedy (phlyax play), Mithaecus food writer and Archimedes.

Aeolic is an exclusively poetic lyric dialect, represented by Sappho and Alcaeus for Lesbian (Aeolic) and Corinna of Tanagra for Boeotian.

Thessalic (Aeolic), Northwest Doric, Arcadocypriot, and Pamphylian never became literary dialects and are only known from inscriptions, and to some extent by the comical parodies of Aristophanes and lexicographers.

Attic proper was used by the Attic orators, Lysias, Isocrates, Aeschines and Demosthenes, the philosophers Plato and Aristotle and the historian Xenophon. Thucydides wrote in Old Attic. The tragic playwrights Aeschylus, Sophocles, and Euripides wrote in an artificial poetic language, and the comic playwright Aristophanes wrote in a language with vernacular elements.

== Classification ==
Distribution of Greek dialects in Greece in the classical period.

Western group:
- Doric proper
- Northwest Doric
- Achaean Doric (probably Northwest Doric)
Central group:
- Aeolic
- Arcado-Cypriot
Eastern group:
- Attic
- Ionic

Distribution of Greek dialects in Magna Graecia (Southern Italy and Sicily) in the classical period.

Western group:
- Doric proper
- Northwest Doric
- Achaean Doric (probably Northwest Doric)
Eastern group:
- Attic-Ionic

=== Ancient classification ===
The ancients classified the language into three gene or four dialects: Ionic proper, Ionic (Attic), Aeolic, Doric and later a fifth one, Koine. Grammarians focus mainly on the literary dialects and isolated words. Historians may classify dialects on mythological/historical reasons rather than linguistic knowledge. According to Strabo, "Ionic is the same as Attic and Aeolic the same as Doric – Outside the Isthmus, all Greeks were Aeolians except the Athenians, the Megarians and the Dorians who live about Parnassus – In the Peloponnese, Achaeans were also Aeolians but only Eleans and Arcadians continued to speak Aeolic". However, for most ancients, Aeolic was synonymous with literary Lesbic. Stephanus of Byzantium characterized Boeotian as Aeolic and Aetolian as Doric. Remarkable is the ignorance of sources, except lexicographers, on Arcadian, Cypriot and Pamphylian.

Finally, unlike Modern Greek and English, Ancient Greek common terms for human speech ( 'glôssa', 'dialektos', 'phônê' and the suffix '-isti' ) may be attributed interchangeably to both a dialect and a language. However, the plural 'dialektoi' is used when dialects and peculiar words are compared and listed by the grammarians under the terms 'lexeis' or 'glôssai'.

=== Modern classification ===
The dialects of classical antiquity are grouped slightly differently by various authorities. Pamphylian is a marginal dialect of Asia Minor and is sometimes left uncategorized. Mycenaean was deciphered only in 1952 and so is missing from the earlier schemes presented here:

Northwestern, Southeastern	Ernst Risch, Museum Helveticum (1955): Northern Greek; Doric/Northwestern Greek; Aeolic; Pamphylian?; Southern Greek; Ionic–Arcadocypriot–Mycenaean	Alfred Heubeck: Northwestern group; Doric/North-Western Greek; Aeolic?; Ancient Macedonian?; Southeastern group; Ionic–Attic; Arcadocypriot
Western, Central, Eastern	A. Thumb, E. Kieckers, Handbuch der griechischen Dialekte (1932): Western Greek; Doric dialects; dialect of Achaea; dialect of Elis; Northwestern Greek; Central Greek; Aeolic; Boeotic; Thessalic; Lesbic; Arcadocypriot; Eastern Greek; Ionic; Attic; Pamphylian	W. Porzig, Die Gliederung des indogermanischen Sprachgebiets (1954): Western Greek; Northwestern Greek; Doric; Aeolic; Eastern Greek; Ionic–Attic; Arcadocypriot
East Greek West Greek	C.D. Buck, The Greek Dialects (1955): (Note: First published in 1928, it was revised and expanded by Buck and republished in 1955, the year of his death. Of the new edition Buck said (Preface): this is virtually a new book." There have been other impressions, but no further changes to the text. The 1955 edition was at the time and to some degree still is the standard text on the subject in the United States. This part of the table is based on the Introduction to the 1955 edition. An example of a modern use of this classification can be found at columbia.edu as Richard C. Carrier's The Major Greek Dialects Archived October 6, 2006, at the Wayback Machine.): East Greek; The Attic–Ionic Group; Attic; Ionic; East Ionic; Central Ionic; West Ionic or Euboean; The Arcadocypriot Group; Arcadian; Cypriot; Pamphylian; The Aeolic Group; Lesbian; Thessalian; Boeotian; West Greek; The Northwestern Greek Group; Phocian (including Delphian); Locrian; Elean; The Northwest Greek koine; The Doric Group; Laconian and Heraclean; Messenian; Megarian; Corinthian; Argolic; Rhodian; Coan; Theran and Cyrenaean; Cretan; Sicilian Doric	

A historical overview of how the dialects were classified in different points in time can be found in Van Rooy (2020).

=== Language tree ===
The following tree is based on the work of Lucien van Beek:

- Graeco-Phrygian
  - Greek
    - South Greek
      - Achaean
        - Mycenaean
        - Arcadocypriot
      - Attic–Ionic
        - Attic
        - Western Ionic
        - Central Ionic
        - Eastern Ionic
    - North Greek
      - Aeolic
        - Boeotian (it also has West Greek features; precursor was possibly a bridge dialect between Aeolic and West Greek)
        - Lesbian (it also has at least one archaic South Greek innovation; precursor was possibly a bridge dialect between Aeolic and South Greek)
        - Thessalian
      - West Greek
        - Doric
        - Northwest Greek
      - Ancient Macedonian
  - Phrygian

== Phonology ==
The Ancient Greek dialects differed mainly in vowels.

=== Hiatus ===
Loss of intervocalic s and consonantal i and w from Proto-Greek brought two vowels together in hiatus, a circumstance often called a "collision of vowels". (Note: Two vowels together are not to be confused with a diphthong, which is two vowel sounds within the same syllable, often spelled with two letters. Greek diphthongs were typically inherited from Proto-Indo-European.) Over time, Greek speakers would change pronunciation to avoid such a collision, and the way that vowels changed determined the dialect.

For example, the word for the "god of the sea" (regardless of the culture and language from which it came) was in some prehistoric form *poseidāwōn (genitive *poseidāwonos). Loss of the intervocalic *w left poseidāōn, which is seen in both Mycenaean and Homeric dialects. Ionic Greek changed the *a to an e (poseideōn), while Attic Greek contracted it to poseidōn. It changed differently in other dialects:

- Corinthian: potedāwoni > potedāni and potedān
- Boeotian: poteidāoni
- Cretan, Rhodian and Delphian: poteidān
- Lesbian: poseidān
- Arcadian: posoidānos
- Laconian: pohoidān

The changes appear designed to place one vowel phoneme instead of two, a process called "contraction", if a third phoneme is created, and "hyphaeresis" ("taking away") if one phoneme is dropped and the other kept. Sometimes, the two phonemes are kept, sometimes modified, as in the Ionic poseideōn.

=== Ā ===
A vowel shift differentiating the Ionic and Attic dialects from the rest was the shift of ā (ᾱ) to ē (η). In Ionic, the change occurred in all positions, but in Attic, it occurred almost everywhere except after e, i, and r (ε, ι, ρ). Homeric Greek shows the Ionic rather than the Attic version of the vowel shift for the most part. Doric and Aeolic show the original forms with ā (ᾱ).

- Attic and Ionic mḗtēr (μήτηρ); Doric mā́tēr (μᾱ́τηρ) "mother" (compare Latin māter)
- Attic neāníās (νεᾱνίᾱς); Ionic neēníēs (νεηνίης) "young man"

=== Ablaut ===
Another principle of vocalic dialectization follows the Indo-European ablaut series or vowel grades. The Proto-Indo-European language could interchange e (e-grade) with o (o-grade) or use neither (zero-grade). Similarly, Greek inherited the series, for example, ei, oi, i, which are e-, o- and zero-grades of the diphthong respectively. They could appear in different verb forms – present leípō (λείπω) "I leave", perfect léloipa (λέλοιπα) "I have left", aorist élipon (ἔλιπον) "I left" – or be used as the basis of dialectization: Attic deíknȳmi (δείκνῡμι) "I point out" but Cretan díknūmi (δίκνῡμι).

== Post-Hellenistic ==
The ancient Greek dialects were a result of isolation and poor communication between communities living in broken terrain. All general Greek historians point out the influence of terrain on the development of the city-states. Often, the development of languages dialectization results in the dissimilation of daughter languages. That phase did not occur in Greek; instead the dialects were replaced by Standard Greek.

Increasing population and communication brought speakers more closely in touch and united them under the same authorities. Attic Greek became the literary language everywhere. Buck says:

"... long after Attic had become the norm of literary prose, each state employed its own dialect, both in private and public monuments of internal concern, and in those of a more... interstate character, such as... treaties...."

In the last few centuries BC, regional dialects replaced local ones: Northwest Greek koine, Doric koine and Attic koine. The last came to replace the others in common speech in the first few centuries AD. After the division of the Roman Empire the earliest Modern Greek prevailed, although a version of Attic Greek was still exclusively taught in schools and served as the official language of the state until the early 20th century. The dialect distribution was then as follows:

- Attic Greek
  - Koiné
    - Byzantine Greek language
      - Modern Greek
        - Demotic Greek
        - Katharevousa
      - Yevanic
      - Cypriot Greek
      - Cretan Greek
      - Southern Italian Greek (Griko and Calabrian/Bovesian), retaining some Doric elements
    - Pontic Greek, retaining some Ionic elements
    - Cappadocian Greek
    - Romano-Greek
- Doric Greek
  - Doric Koiné
    - Tsakonian

According to some scholars, Tsakonian is the only modern Greek dialect that descends from Doric, albeit with some influence from the Koine. Others include the Southern Italian dialects in this group, though perhaps they should rather be regarded as descended from the local Doric-influenced variant of the Koine.
