= Nepenthe =

Medicine for sorrow

Nepenthe /nɪˈpɛnθi/ (Ancient Greek: νηπενθές, nēpenthés) is a possibly fictional medicine for sorrow – a "drug of forgetfulness" mentioned in ancient Greek literature and Greek mythology, depicted as originating in Egypt.

The carnivorous plant genus Nepenthes is named after the drug nepenthe.

== In the Odyssey ==
The word nepenthe first appears in the fourth book of Homer's Odyssey:

ἔνθ᾽ αὖτ᾽ ἄλλ᾽ ἐνόησ᾽ Ἑλένη Διὸς ἐκγεγαυῖα:
αὐτίκ᾽ ἄρ᾽ εἰς οἶνον βάλε φάρμακον, ἔνθεν ἔπινον,
νηπενθές τ᾽ ἄχολόν τε, κακῶν ἐπίληθον ἁπάντων.

—Odyssey, Book 4, v. 219–221

Then Helen, daughter of Zeus, took other counsel.
Straightway she cast into the wine of which they were drinking a drug
to quiet all pain and strife, and bring forgetfulness of every ill.

== Analysis ==
Figuratively, nepenthe means "that which chases away sorrow". Literally it means 'not-sorrow' or 'anti-sorrow': νη-, nē-, i.e. "not" (privative prefix), and πενθές, from πένθος, pénthos, i.e. "grief, sorrow, or mourning".

In the Odyssey, νηπενθές φάρμακον : nēpenthés phármakon (i.e. an anti-sorrow drug) is a magical potion given to Helen by Polydamna, the wife of the noble Egyptian Thon; it quells all sorrows with forgetfulness.
