= Polydamna =

Polydamna (/ˌpɒlɪˈdæmnə/; Ancient Greek: Πολύδαμνα, romanized: Polúdamna) is an Egyptian figure from Greek mythology.

== Mythology ==
Mentioned in Homer’s Odyssey, Polydamna was the wife of Thōn (Θῶν, gen: Θῶνος), often known as "Thon the Egyptian", owing to his Egyptian heritage. Polydamna gave Helen, wife of Menelaus, nepenthe (i.e., a drug that has "the power of robbing grief and anger of their sting and banishing all painful memories") and which Helen slipped into the wine that Telemachus and Menelaus were drinking.
