= Privative =

Linguistic term

A privative, named from Latin privare 'to deprive', is a particle that negates or inverts the value of the stem of the word. In Indo-European languages, many privatives are prefixes, but they can also be suffixes, or more independent elements.

== Privative prefixes ==
In English there are three primary privative prefixes, all cognate from Proto-Indo-European:

- un- from West Germanic, from Proto-Germanic; e.g. unprecedented, unbelievable
- in- from Latin; e.g. incapable, inarticulate.
- a-, called alpha privative, from Ancient Greek ἀ-, ἀν-, from Proto-Hellenic *ə-; e.g. apathetic, abiogenesis.

These all stem from a PIE syllabic nasal privative *n̥-, the zero ablaut grade of the negation *ne, i.e. "n" used as a vowel, as in some English pronunciations of "button". This is the source of the 'n' in 'an-' privative prefixed nouns deriving from the Greek, which had both. For this reason, it appears as an- before vowel, e.g. anorexia, anesthesia.

The same prefix appears in Sanskrit, also as a- अ-, an- अन्- ( , -n- infix). In Slavic languages the privative is nie- and u-, e.g. nieboga, ubogi. In North Germanic languages, the -n- has disappeared and Old Norse has ú- (e.g. ú-dáins-akr), which became u- in Danish and Norwegian, o- in Swedish, and ó- in Icelandic.

Privative prefixes are not a feature exclusive to Indo-European languages, but also exist in languages belonging to other families, such as Hebrew: אל־, romanized: al- (Semitic).

=== Confusion of privative and non-privative in English ===
Many words introduced into the English from the Latin start with the prefix in-. While often, it is a privative, it is not always so. Even if it is a privative, the meaning may be unclear to those who are not familiar with the word. The following three examples illustrate that:

1. inexcusable
  The - prefix is a privative and the word means the opposite of excusable that is, "unable to be excused, not excusable".
2. invaluable
  That is also a privative but it does not mean "not valuable, not precious". While today valuable is a synonym for precious, it originally meant "able to be given a value". (Note: The meaning "able to be given a value" is largely obsolete today.) The meaning of invaluable hinges upon this original meaning and thus means "of very great value" or literally "value cannot be estimated (because it is so great)", similar to priceless but dissimilar to worthless.
3. inflammable
  A naive reader may incorrectly interpret that as "not flammable". However, the word contains not a privative but a locative and flammable (the newer word in English by 300 years), rather than being the opposite of inflammable means the same thing.

The prefix in- arises from the Latin for "in, inside, within" and inflammable derives from the Latin root inflammāre meaning "able to be set alight, able to kindle a flame". Since at least the 1920s, there have been calls to stop using inflammable and substitute it exclusively with flammable to avoid the confusion that occurs even by native English-speakers.

== Privative suffixes ==
Some languages have privative suffixes; -less is an example in English. Further examples are -t(a)lan or -t(e)len in Hungarian or -ton/-tön in Finnish (non-IE languages).

== See also ==
- Copulative a
- Privative a
- Abessive case
