= Alexander Donat =

Polish Holocaust survivor (1905–1983)

- Born: Mojzesz Grynberg; 1905; Warsaw, Poland
- Died: 16 June 1983 (aged 77–78); New York City, New York, U.S.
- Occupations: Journalist; author
- Writing career
- Genre: Non-fiction

Alexander Donat, also Aleksander Donat in Polish (1905 – 16 June 1983), was a Holocaust survivor imprisoned at the Lodz Ghetto and several Nazi concentration camps during the occupation of Poland by Nazi Germany in World War II. After the war, Donat, a chemist by training and journalist by profession, emigrated with his family to the United States, settling in New York City. As an eyewitness to the Holocaust in Poland, he went on to write about his wartime experiences, collect documents, and publish the narratives of others.

== Biography ==
Alexander Donat was born Mojzesz Grynberg in the Polish capital Warsaw where he lived until World War II. (For reasons that are not entirely clear, in his memoir The Holocaust Kingdom, he chose to use the name "Michał Berg" instead of his actual birth name.) In Warsaw, Grynberg was a publisher of a daily newspaper. In 1933, he married Leona Liberman. In 1937, they welcomed a son - Wlodzimierz - nicknamed "Wlodek" (later changed to William after emigrating to the United States). Following the Nazi German invasion of Poland Grynberg (Donat) and his family were forced into the Warsaw Ghetto. From there, he was deported to several slave labor and concentration camps including Majdanek. Grynberg met a prisoner whose real name was Alexander Donat at Vaihingen concentration camp. They secretly agreed to switch their names for a prisoner transport. Soon thereafter the real Alexander Donat was murdered. Grynberg decided to keep Donat's name as his own forever. Donat feared that, "should the Nazis be victorious, 'future generations will pay tribute to them'" similar to Homeric Greek crusaders. He was liberated from Dachau by American troops and returned to Warsaw, where he found his wife and their son, whom the Polish rescuers had placed in a Catholic orphanage. The Donats went to the United States and opened a printing business.

Upon emigrating to the United States, Donat co-founded Waldon Press with another Holocaust survivor, Benjamin Wald, who served as a translator at the Nuremberg trials. In 1977, Donat helped found "The Holocaust Library", a non-profit program to launch books that condemn persecution and tell of the personal experiences of the Jews during the Second World War. He died of a lung disease at Mount Sinai Hospital in New York City.

His son William Donat was a noted publisher who became President of Waldon Press upon Alexander's retirement. He died on November 2, 2009.

== Publications ==
- Jewish Resistance (1964)
- Holocaust Kingdom (1965)
- The Death Camp Treblinka: a documentary (1979)
