= Arcadocypriot Greek =

Ancient Greek dialect of Arcadia and Cyprus

- Region: Arcadia, Cyprus
- Era: c. 1300 – c. 200 BC
- Language family: Indo-European: Hellenic; (disputed); Achaean; Arcadocypriot Greek
- Early forms: Proto-Greek: Proto-Achaean; Proto-Arcadocypriot
- Writing system: Greek alphabet Cypriot syllabary

Language codes
- ISO 639-3: –
- Glottolog: arca1234
- Distribution of Greek dialects in Greece in the classical period. Western group: Doric proper; Northwest Doric; Achaean Doric (probably Northwest Doric); Central group: Aeolic; Arcado-Cypriot; Eastern group: Attic; Ionic

Arcadocypriot, or southern Achaean, was an ancient Greek dialect spoken in Arcadia (the central Peloponnese) and Cyprus. Its resemblance to Mycenaean Greek, as it is known from the Linear B corpus, indicates that they are closely related to it, and belong to the same dialect group, known as Achaean.

In Cyprus the dialect was written solely using the Cypriot syllabary. The most extensive surviving text of the dialect is the Idalion Tablet. A significant literary source on the vocabulary comes from the lexicon of grammarian Hesychius (probably 5th century AD).

== History ==
Proto-Arcadocypriot was the prevailing dialect spoken in southern Greece (including Achaea, the Argolid, Laconia, Crete, and Rhodes) at the end of the Bronze Age. The Mycenaean and Arcadocypriot dialects both belong to the Achaean group. Certain common innovations of Arcadian and Cypriot, as attested in the first millennium BC, indicate that they represent vernaculars that had slightly diverged from the Mycenaean administrative language, sometime before a migration to Cyprus, possibly during the 13th or 12th century BC. Pausanias reported:

Agapenor, the son of Ancaeus, the son of Lycurgus, who was king after Echemus, led the Arcadians to Troy. After the capture of Troy the storm that overtook the Greeks on their return home carried Agapenor and the Arcadian fleet to Cyprus, and so Agapenor became the founder of Paphos and built the Sanctuary of Aphrodite Paphia.

The establishment happened before 1100 BC. With the arrival of Dorians in the Peloponnese, a part of the population moved to Cyprus, and the rest was limited to the Arcadian mountains.

According to John T. Hooker, the preferable explanation for the general historico-linguistic picture is that:

... in the Bronze Age, at the time of the great Mycenaean expansion, a dialect of a high degree of uniformity was spoken both in Cyprus and in the Peloponnese but that at some subsequent epoch the speakers of West Greek intruded upon the Peloponnese and occupied the coastal states, but made no significant inroads into Arcadia.

== Later developments ==
After the collapse of the Mycenaean world, communication ended, and Cypriot was differentiated from Arcadian. It was written until the 3rd century BC using the Cypriot syllabary.

Arcadocypriot kept many characteristics of Mycenaean, lost early in the development of Attic and Ionic, such as the /w/ sound (digamma).

== Glossary ==
=== Arcadian ===
Arcadian	Romanization	Meaning	Cognates and equivalents in other Greek dialects
ἀμφιδεκάτη	amphidekátē	'twenty-first day of the month' (lit. 'around the tenth [day from the end]') (cf. ἡ μετὰ εἰκάδα ἡμέρα, hē metà eikáda hēméra)	ἀμφεικάς (ampheikás); cf. δεκάτη (dekátē, 'tenth')
ἄνωδα	ánōda	'from above; upwards'	Attic (Att.) ἄνωθεν (ánōthen), ἄνωθε (ánōthe)
ἄρμωλα, ἀρμώμαλα	ármōla, armṓmala	'food seasoning; condiments'	Att. ἀρτύματα (artúmata); cf. ἀρτύω (artúō, 'to prepare, season')
ἄσιστος	ásistos	'nearest'	Att. ἄγχιστος (ánkhistos)
δάριν ACC.SG	dárin	'span' (see Ancient Greek units of measurement)	Att. σπιθαμή (spithamḗ); Laconian (Lac.) δάρειρ (dáreir, for *δάρις, dáris)
Ἑκατόμβαιος	Hekatómbaios	Epithet of Apollo in Athens and of Zeus in Gortys and Gortyna (Crete); cf. hecatomb	—
Ϝιστίαυ GEN.SG	Wistíau	'of Wistias' (masculine personal name)	Att. Ἑστίου (Hestíou) GEN of Ἑστίας (Hestías); cf. Hestia and γιστία (gistía, 'hearth')
ϝοῖνος	woînos	'wine'	Cypriot (Cypr.), Cretan (Cret.), Delphic, and Magna Graecian ϝοῖνος (woînos); Att. οἶνος (oînos)
ζέλλω	zéllō	'to throw, cast'	Att. βάλλω (bállō)
ζέρεθρον	zérethron	'pit, gully'	Homeric (Hom.) βέρεθρον (bérethron); Att. and Koine βάραθρον (bárathron)
θύρδα	thúrda	'outside, out of doors'	Att. θύραζε (thúraze), ἔξω (éxō) (cf. θύρα, thúra, 'door'); Paphian Cypr. θόρανδε (thórande)
ἴν	ín	'in, into'	Cypr. ἴν (ín); Att. ἐν (en), εἰς (eis)
κάθιδος	káthidos	'water-jug'	Att. ὑδρία (hudría, hydria); Tarentine ὑετός (huetós)
κάς	kás	'and'	Cypr. κάς (kás); Att. καί (kaí)
κίδαρις	kídaris	'an Arcadian dance' (Athenaeus 14.631d); cf. Demeter Kidaría in Arcadia	—
κόρϝα	kórwa	'girl, maiden'	Att. κόρη (kórē); cf. Pamphylian feminine name Κορϝαλίνα (Korwalína)
Κορτύνιοι	Kortúnioi	'Gortynians', inhabitants of Kortys (Gortys)	Att. Γορτύνιοι (Gortúnioi)
κυβήβη	kubḗbē	'boot, shoe'	Att. ὑπόδημα (hupódēma)
Λῆναι	Lênai	'Bacchae' (cf. Dionysus Lenaeus and the Lenaia festival)	—
μωρίαι	mōríai	'horses, cattle'	—
οὔνη, οὔνει	oúnē, oúnei	'come here!; run!'	Att. δεῦρο (deûro, 'hither'), δράμε (dráme, 'run!')
πέσσεται	péssetai	'it is cooked, roasted'	Att. ὀπτᾶται (optâtai)
πός	pós	'towards, to'	Cypr. πός (pós); Att. πρός (prós); Cf. Arcadian (Arc.) ποσκατυβλάψῃ (poskatublápsēi; Att. προσκαταβλάψῃ, proskatablápsēi)
σίς	sís	'who, anyone'	Cypr. σίς (sís) (cf. σί βόλε;, sí bóle?, 'what do you want?'); Att. τίς (tís); Lac. τίρ (tír); Thessalian (Thess.) κίς (kís)

=== Cypriot ===
Cypriot	Romanization	Meaning	Cognates and equivalents in other Greek dialects
ἀβάθων	abáthōn	'teacher'	Att. διδάσκαλος (didáskalos)
ἁβαριστάν ACC.SG.F	habaristán	'acting like a woman; effeminate'	Att. γυναικιζομένην (gunaikizoménēn)
ἀβαρταί NOM.PL.F	abartaí	'winged; birds'	Att. αἱ πτηναί (hai ptēnaí), τὰ πτηνά (tà ptēná)
ἀβλάξ	abláx	'splendidly; brightly'	Att. λαμπρῶς (lamprôs); cf. privative a- + βλάξ (bláx, 'slack, foolish'), βλάπτω (bláptō, 'to harm')
ἀβρεμής	abremḗs	'unworthy of being seen; unsightly; despicable' (cf. ἀβλεπής, ablepḗs; ἀνάξιος τοῦ βλέπεσθαι, anáxios toû blépesthai)	—
ἁγάνα, ἀγάνα	hagána, agána	'dragnet, seine'	Att. σαγήνη (sagḗnē)
ἄγαν θές 2SG IMP	ágan thés	'be quiet!; shut up!'	Att. σιώπα (siṓpa); cf. ἄγαν (ágan, 'too much') + θές (thés, 2SG IMP of τίθημι, títhēmi, 'to put')
ἄγκυρα	ánkura	'three-obol coin'	Att. τριώβολον (triṓbolon) (cf. Att. ἄγκυρα, ánkura, 'anchor')
ἀγλαόν	aglaón	'smooth, polished; sweet'	Cret. ἀγλαόν (aglaón); Att. γλαφυρόν (glaphurón) (cf. Att. ἀγλαός, aglaós, 'splendid, bright')
ἀγόρ	agór	'eagle'	Att. ἀετός (aetós)
ἀγχοῦρος, ἄγχαυρος	ankhoûros, ánkhauros	'near the morning, at dawn; morning star'	Cf. Att. ἄγχι (ánkhi, 'near') + αὔριον (aúrion, 'tomorrow')
ἄδειὁς	ádeihos	'unclean; impure'	Att. ἀκάθαρτος (akáthartos) (cf. Att. ἀδεής, adeḗs / Ionic [Ion.] ἀδειής, adeiḗs, 'fearless'; Byzantine and Modern Greek άδειος, ádeios, 'empty')
ἄδρυον	ádruon	'dugout canoe; monoxylon'	Att. πλοῖον μονόξυλον (ploîon monóxulon); from copulative a- + δρῦς (drûs, 'oak; timber')
ἀθρίζειν INF	athrízein	'to shiver with cold'	Att. ῥιγοῦν (rhigoûn); cf. αἴθρος (aíthros, 'morning frost')
ἀίεις 2SG	aíeis	'you hear; listen'	Att. ἀκούεις (akoúeis); cf. poetic ἀΐω (aïō, 'to hear, perceive')
αἰπόλος	aipólos	'tavern-keeper; retail dealer'	Att. and Koine κάπηλος (kápēlos) (cf. Att. αἰπόλος, aipólos, 'goatherd'; πωλέω, pōléō, 'to sell')
ἀκεύει 3SG	akeúei	'he watches over, observes; keeps'	Att. τηρεῖ (tēreî)
ἄκμων	ákmōn	'pestle'	Att. ἀλετρίβανος (aletríbanos, 'pestle') (cf. Att. ἄκμων, ákmōn, 'anvil', and mythological Acmon)
ἀκοστή	akostḗ	'barley' (per Hesychius [Hsch.])	Att. κριθή (krithḗ); Thess. ἀκοστή (akostḗ, 'grain of all kinds' per Schol. on Iliad 6.506)
ἅλς	háls	'wine' (in ACC.SG ἅλα, hála)	Att. οἶνος (oînos) (cf. Att. ἅλς, háls, 'salt; sea')
ἀλάβη, ἀλάβα	alábē, alába	'soot; charcoal embers; ash' (Hsch.: λιγνύς, σποδός, καρκίνος, ἄνθρακες, lignús, spodós, karkínos, ánthrakes)	Att. μαρίλη (marílē, 'charcoal-dust, embers')
ἀλειπτήριον	aleiptḗrion	'writing implement; place for writing or engraving'	Att. γραφεῖον (grapheîon); from ἀλείφω (aleíphō, 'to anoint, smear'; in Cypr. also 'to write')
ἄλευρον	áleuron	'grave; tomb'	Att. τάφος (táphos) (cf. λευρός, leurós, 'smooth, level', and Att. ἄλευρον, áleuron, 'wheat flour')
ἄλουα NOM/ACC.PL.N	áloua	'gardens'	Att. κῆποι (kêpoi); cf. Hom. ἀλωή (alōḗ, 'threshing-floor; garden, vineyard')
ἁλουργά NOM/ACC.PL.N	halourgá	'purple things from the sea' (Hsch.: τὰ ἐκ τῆς θαλάσσης πορφυρᾶ, tà ek tês thalássēs porphurâ)	Att. ἁλουργής (halourgḗs, 'wrought in or by the sea; sea-purple')
ἄνδα	ánda	'this woman; she'	Att. αὕτη (haútē)
ἄορον	áoron	'lever, gate-bar; gateway; doorkeeper' (Hsch.: μοχλός, πυλών, θυρωρός, mokhlós, pulṓn, thurōrós)	Cf. Aeolic (Aeol.) ἄορος (áoros, 'sleepless')
ἀούματα NOM/ACC.PL.N	aoúmata	'chaff of husked barley' (Hsch.: τὰ τῶν πτισσομένων κριθῶν ἄχυρα, tà tôn ptissoménōn krithôn ákhura)	Cf. λούματα (loúmata), λύματα (lúmata, 'offscourings; refuse')
ἀπέλυκα 1SG PRF	apéluka	'I have broken off; am rent'	Att. ἀπέῤῥωγα (apérrhōga)
ἀπλανῆ NOM/ACC.PL.N	aplanê	'many; much'	Att. πολλά (pollá), Lac. ἀάμερα (aámera) (cf. Att. ἀπλανής, aplanḗs, 'unwandering, fixed [of stars]')
ἀποαἵρει 3SG	apohaírei	'he cleanses; clears away'	Att. ἀποκαθαίρει (apokathaírei) (cf. Att. ἀπαίρω, apaírō, 'to lift off, depart')
ἀπόγεμε 2SG IMP	apógeme	'draw off; drag away!'	Att. ἄφελκε (áphelke) (cf. Att. γέμω, gémō, 'to be full of')
ἀπολοισθεῖν INF	apoloistheîn	'to finish completely; bring to an end'	Att. ἀποτελεῖν (apoteleîn); cf. λοῖσθος (loîsthos, 'last')
ἀπόλυγμα	apólugma	'stripping; denudation'	Att. ἀπογύμνωσις (apogúmnōsis); cf. ἀπόλουμα (apólouma)
ἀρὰς ἐπισπεῖραι INF	aràs epispeîrai	'to sow curses' (Cypriot custom of cursing someone while sowing barley mixed with salt) (Hsch.: σπειρόντων κριθὰς μεθ᾽ ἁλὸς καταρᾶσθαί τισιν, speiróntōn krithàs meth' halòs katarâsthaí tisin)	—
ἄριζος	árizos	'grave; tomb'	Att. τάφος (táphos) (cf. privative a- + ῥίζα, rhíza, 'root')
ἄρμυλα NOM/ACC.PL.N	ármula	'shoes; sandals'	Att. ὑποδήματα (hupodḗmata)
ἀρμώατος	armṓatos	'spasm; convulsion'	Att. σπασμός (spasmós)
ἄρουρα	ároura	'heap of grain with chaff' (Hsch.: σωρὸς σίτου σὺν ἀχύροις, sōròs sítou sùn akhúrois)	Cf. Hom. and Ion. ἄρουρα (ároura, 'tilled land; earth')
ἄρπιξ, ἅρπιξ, ἄπριξ	árpix, hárpix, áprix	'kind of thorn-bush; acanthus' (Hsch.: εἶδος ἀκάνθης, eîdos akánthēs)	Cf. Att. ἀπρίξ (apríx, 'tightly, holding fast')
αὔγαρος	aúgaros	'wasteful; prodigal'	Att. ἄσωτος (ásōtos)
αὐεκίζειν INF	auekízein	'to become gangrenous; mortify'	Att. σφακελίζειν (sphakelízein)
Ἀχαιομάντεις NOM.PL	Akhaiománteis	'Achaean seers' (priestly clan in Cyprus per Hsch.)	—
βᾶλλαι NOM.PL.F	bâllai	'steps, degrees; thresholds'	Att. βαθμοί (bathmoí)
βλάστα	blásta	'sprouting, vegetation; bud'	Att. βλάστησις (blástēsis), βλάστη (blástē)
βομβοία	bomboía	'pickled olive' (swimming in brine)	Att. κολυμβὰς ἐλαία (kolumbàs elaía, from κολυμβάω, kolumbáō, 'to dive, swim')
βορβορίζει 3SG	borborízei	'he mutters, grumbles; befouls' (Hsch.: γογγύζει, μολύνει, gongúzei, molúnei)	Cf. Att. βορβορυγμός (borborugmós, 'intestinal rumbling') and βόρβορος (bórboros, 'mud, mire')
βουκανῆ	boukanê	'anemone flower'	Att. ἀνεμώνη (anemṓnē) (cf. βυκάνη, bukánē, 'trumpet')
βουνός	bounós	'bed of straw, reeds, or leaves; mound'	Att. στιβάς (stibás); Cyrenaican and Koine βουνός (bounós, 'hill, mound')
βοώνητα NOM/ACC.PL.N	boṓnēta	'unholy or abominable things; dung'	Cf. Att. βοώνητα (boṓnēta, 'things bought for the price of oxen', τιμῆς βοῶν ἠγορασμένα, timês boôn ēgorasména)
βρένθιξ	brénthix	'lettuce'	Att. θριδακίνη (thridakínē), θρίδαξ (thrídax)
βρίγκα	brínka	'small, little'	Att. μικρόν (mikrón)
βριμάζειν INF	brimázein	'to be in heat; swell with lust' (Hsch.: ὀργᾶν εἰς συνουσίαν, orgân eis sunousían)	Cf. Att. βριμάομαι (brimáomai, 'to snort with anger') and Brimo (Βριμώ, Brimṓ)
βροῦκα ACC.SG	broûka	'green locust' (Hsch.: χλωρὰν ἀκρίδα, khlōràn akrída)	Ion. βροῦκος (broûkos), Att. βροῦχος (broûkhos)
βρούχετος	broúkhetos	'frog' (also 'pit', βάραθρον, bárathron in Hsch.)	Att. βάτραχος (bátrakhos)
βύβλιοι NOM.PL	búblioi	'grave-guards; tomb-wardens'	Att. ταφοφύλακες (taphophúlakes)
γάνος NOM.PL γάνεα	gános (gánea)	'garden; paradise' (borrowed from Northwest Semitic; cf. Hebrew גַּן, gan, 'garden')	Att. παράδεισος (parádeisos) (cf. Att. γάνος, gános, 'brightness, sheen; gladness')
γέμοις νυ 2SG OPT	gémois nu	'take; sit down!' (Hsch.: λαβὲ καὶ κάθιζε, labè kaì káthize; lit. 'may you now be full')	—
γένεσις	génesis	'libation'	Att. σπονδή (spondḗ)
γοᾶναι INF	goânai	'to weep; wail'	Att. κλαίειν (klaíein), γοᾶν (goân, from γοάω, goáō)
γρᾶ, γρᾶσθι 2SG IMP	grâ, grâsthi	'eat!' (from γράω, gráō, 'to gnaw, eat', from PIE *gres-; cf. Sanskrit ग्रसते, grasate, 'devours')	Att. φάγε (pháge); cf. Salaminian Cypr. καγρᾶς (kagrâs, 'devourer', from κατά + γράω; Koine καταφαγᾶς, kataphagâs, 'glutton')
δαματρίζειν INF	damatrízein	'to gather the fruits of Demeter; harvest grain' (Hsch.: τὸ συνάγειν τὸν Δημητριακὸν καρπόν, tò sunágein tòn Dēmētriakòn karpón)	—
δεῖν INF	deîn	'to turn; twist'	Att. στρέφειν (stréphein) (cf. Att. δέω, déō, 'to bind, tie')
δίπτυον	díptuon	'half-medimnos' (a dry measure)	Att. ἡμιμέδιμνον (hēmimédimnon); Aeol. κάμμαρψις (kámmarpsis)
διφθεραλοιφός	diphtheraloiphós	'schoolmaster; elementary teacher' (lit. 'leather or parchment-painter', from διφθέρα, diphthéra, 'prepared hide' + ἀλείφω, aleíphō, 'to smear, write')	Att. γραμματοδιδάσκαλος (grammatodidáskalos)
δρόσος	drósos	'useless; unprofitable'	Att. ἀχρεῖος (akhreîos) (cf. Att. δρόσος, drósos, 'dew')
δύσεα NOM/ACC.PL.N	dúsea	'surroundings of a wall' (Hsch.: τοῦ τοίχου τὰ πέριξ, toû toíkhou tà périx)	—
ἔαρ	éar	'blood'	Att. αἷμα (haîma); cf. Hom. εἶαρ (eîar, 'blood') and Att. ἔαρ (éar, 'spring')
Ἔγχειος	Énkheios	'of the spear' (Cypriot epithet of Aphrodite; from ἔγχος, énkhos, 'spear')	—
ἔλαψα 1SG AOR	élapsa	'I destroyed; corrupted'	Att. διέφθειρα (diéphtheira)
ἔλφος	élphos	'butter'	Att. βούτυρον (boúturon)
ἔναυὁν 2SG AOR IMP	énauhon	'put in; kindle, ignite!' (with Cypr. debuccalization of intervocalic -s- for ἔναυσον, énauson, from ἐναύω, enaúō)	Att. ἔνθες (énthes, 'put in!'), ἔναυσον (énauson, 'kindle!')
ἔπιξα NOM/ACC.PL.N	épixa	'birds'	Att. ὄρνεα (órnea)
ἐροῦντες NOM.PL.PTCP	eroûntes	'speaking; saying' PRS PTCP	Att. λέγοντες (légontes) (in Att., ἐροῦντες, eroûntes is FUT PTCP 'about to say')
ἐρούα 2SG IMP	eroúa	'cease; rest!' (Hsch.: πορεύου, ἀναπαύου, poreúou, anapaúou)	Cf. Hom. ἐρωέω (erōéō, 'to flow, draw back; cease'), ἐρωή (erōḗ, 'cessation; rest')
ἔστη	éstē	'garment; dress'	Att. στολή (stolḗ), ἐσθής (esthḗs)
ζάει 3SG	záei	'it blows, breathes; has sexual intercourse' (Hsch.: βινεῖ, κινεῖ, καὶ πνεῖ, bineî, kineî, kaì pneî)	Att. πνεῖ (pneî, 'it blows'), βινεῖ (bineî, 'fornicates'); cf. ἄησι (áēsi, 'it blows')
θᾶτες, θύτες NOM.PL	thâtes, thútes	'hired labourers; serfs' (see Thetes and Timocracy)	Att. θῆτες (thêtes)
θεῖον	theîon	'mortar'	Att. ἴγδιον (ígdion), θυεία (thueía)
θίβων	thíbōn	'chest, ark; plaited basket'	Koine θῖβις (thîbis) (loanword from Egyptian tb.t, 'box, chest'; cf. Hebrew תֵּבָה, tēḇā, 'ark')
θρόδαξ	thródax	'lettuce'	Att. θρίδαξ (thrídax)
θύα NOM/ACC.PL.N	thúa	'spices, condiments; flavourings'	Att. ἀρτύματα (artúmata), ἀρώματα (arṓmata) (cf. θύον, thúon, 'incense, burnt offering')
ἵγα 2SG IMP	híga	'keep silent; shut up!'	Att. σίγα (síga), σιώπα (siṓpa); Cret. ἴγα (íga)
ἱμονιά	himoniá	'leather strap; well-rope'	Att. ἱμάς (himás, 'strap'), ἱμονιά (himoniá, 'well-rope')
ἵν DAT/ACC.SG	hín	'to/for him/her; himself/herself' (archaic reflexive/personal pronoun ἵ, hí)	Att. οἷ (hoî) DAT, ἕ (hé) ACC; Hom. and Doric (Dor.) μιν (min), νιν (nin)
καλίνδινα NOM/ACC.PL.N	kalíndina	'intestines; bowels'	Att. ἔντερα (éntera); Hom. χολάδες (kholádes); Macedonian γόλα (góla)
καχίλα NOM/ACC.PL.N	kakhíla	'flowers'	Att. ἄνθη (ánthē)
κενεά NOM/ACC.PL.N	keneá	'climbing vines trained on trees'	Att. ἀναδενδράδες (anadendrádes) (cf. Ion. κενεά, keneá / Att. κενά, kená, 'empty')
κίβισις	kíbisis	'pouch, wallet; knapsack'	Att. πήρα (pḗra); Aetolian κίββα (kíbba)
κίλλος	kíllos	'morning cicada' (Hsch.: τέττιξ πρωϊνός, téttix prōïnós)	Cf. Dor. κίλλος (kíllos, 'donkey; grey')
Κινυράδαι NOM.PL	Kinurádai	'Cinyrads', priestly clan of Aphrodite (ἱερεῖς Ἀφροδίτης, hiereîs Aphrodítēs)	—
κίρις, κίῤῥις	kíris, kírrhis	Cypriot epithet of Adonis	Lac. κίῤῥις (kírrhis, 'lamp', Att. λύχνος, lúkhnos)
κίτταρις	kíttaris	'Cypriot diadem or tiara' (Κίτταροι, Kíttaroi: those who wear it)	Arc. κίδαρις (kídaris), Att. κίδαρις (kídaris), κίταρις (kítaris)
κιχητός	kikhētós	'vessel or liquid in which frankincense (λιβανωτός, libanōtós) is dipped' (Hsch.: εἰς ὃ ἐμβάπτεται ὁ λιβανωτός, eis hò embáptetai ho libanōtós)	—
κυνύπισμα	kunúpisma	'drink made from pressed grape pomace' (στέμφυλα, stémphula)	Att. λάκωνας (lákōnas) / δευτερίας (deuterías, 'after-wine')
λήνεα, λεῖνα NOM/ACC.PL.N	lḗnea, leîna	'wool'	Att. ἔρια (éria), Ion. λῆνος (lênos)
μόψος	mópsos	'stain on garments' (Hsch.: κηλὶς ἡ ἐν τοῖς ἱματίοις, kēlìs hē en toîs himatíois)	Att. κηλίς (kēlís) (cf. mythological Mopsus)
μύθα	mútha	'voice; speech'	Att. φωνή (phōnḗ); cf. μῦθος (mûthos, 'word, speech; tale'), μυθέομαι (muthéomai, 'to speak')
μυλάσασθαι AOR INF MID	mulásasthai	'to wash or rub oneself with unguent or soap'	Att. σμήξασθαι (smḗxasthai, from σμήχω, smḗkhō)
ὄλινοι NOM.PL, ὤλενος	ólinoi, ṓlenos	'sheaves of barley' (Hsch.: κριθῆς δέσμαι, krithês désmai)	Cf. Att. ὠλένη (ōlénē, 'forearm; armful')
ὀρτός	ortós	'altar'	Att. βωμός (bōmós)
οὐάραι NOM.PL	ouárai	'we'	Att. ἡμεῖς (hēmeîs)
οὔαρον	oúaron	'olive oil'	Att. ἔλαιον (élaion)
οὖνον, οὖνος	oûnon, oûnos	'racecourse, running; road'	Att. δρόμος (drómos), ὁδός (hodós)
πέσσον ACC.SG	pésson	'plain, territory; boundary' (Hsch.: ὄρος, χωρίον, πεδίον, óros, khōríon, pedíon)	Att. πεδίον (pedíon, 'plain'), χωρίον (khōríon, 'place, estate')
πιλνόν	pilnón	'grey, dusky; livid'	Att. φαιόν (phaión, 'dusky, grey'), πελιδνόν (pelidnón, 'livid')
πρέπον	prépon	'portent; monster, beast'	Att. τέρας (téras) (cf. Att. πρέπων, prépōn, 'a sea-fish', and πρέπον, prépon, 'fitting, seemly')
Πυγμαίων	Pugmaíōn	Cypriot epithet of Adonis (borrowed from Phoenician Pumayyaton / Pygmalion)	—
ῥύεινα ACC.SG	rhúeina	'lamb'	Att. ἄρνα (árna, ACC.SG of ἀρήν, arḗn, from *ϝρήν, *wrḗn)
σί βόλε;	sí bóle?	'what do you want?'	Att. τί βούλει; (tí boúlei?)
σίγυνον, σιγύνης	sígunon, sigúnēs	'hunting-spear; javelin'	Att. ἀκόντιον (akóntion, 'javelin'), δόρυ (dóru, 'spear')

==== Paphian ====
Paphian	Romanization	Meaning	Cognates and equivalents in other Greek dialects
ἐπίκορον	epíkoron	'struck, restamped [of a coin]; chopping block'	Att. ἐπίκοπον (epíkopon) (cf. κείρω, keírō and κόπτω, kóptō, 'to cut')
ἐς πόθ᾽ ἕρπες;	es póth' hérpes?	'where do you come from?'	Att. πόθεν ἥκεις; (póthen hḗkeis?) (cf. Att. ἕρπειν, hérpein, 'to creep, crawl [like a serpent]'; in Cypr. and Dor., 'to go, come')
εὐτρόσσεσθαι INF MID	eutróssesthai	'to turn oneself about; return'	Att. ἐπιστρέφεσθαι (epistréphesthai)
θόρανδε	thórande	'outside, out of doors'	Arc. θύρδα (thúrda); Att. θύραζε (thúraze), ἔξω (éxō) (cf. θύρα, thúra, 'door')
ἵγγια, ἴγγια	híngia, íngia	'one'	Att. εἷς (heîs) M, μία (mía) F, ἕν (hén) N; Cret. ἴττον (ítton)
ἰμίτραιον	imítraion	'undergirt; under-girdle; ship's bracing cable'	Att. ὑπόζωστον (hupózōston, per Hsch.; from ἴν, ín + μίτρα, mítra, 'girdle')
ἰμπάταὁν, ἰγκαπάταὁν 2SG AOR IMP	impátahon, inkapátahon	'look into!; look down upon!'	Att. ἔμβλεψον (émblepson), ἐγκατάβλεψον (enkatáblepson, per Hsch.)
κάβειος	kábeios	'young'	Att. νέος (néos)
καβλή	kablḗ	'door-latch, bolt'	Att. and Koine μάνδαλος (mándalos), καταβολή (katabolḗ)
κακκέρσαι AOR INF	kakkérsai	'to cut down; slay'	Att. κατακόψαι (katakópsai), κατακεῖραι (katakeîrai, from κατά, katá + κείρω, keírō, 'to cut, shear')
καλέχεο 2SG IMP MID	kalékheo	'lie down!'	Att. κατάκεισο (katákeiso); cf. Hom. λέχος (lékhos, 'bed')
καπατάξεις 2SG FUT	kapatáxeis	'you will strike down, cut down; slay'	Att. κατακόψεις (katakópseis), καταπατάξεις (katapatáxeis)
κάῤῥαξον 2SG AOR IMP	kárrhaxon	'dash down; strike, smash!'	Att. κατάραξον (katáraxon, from κατά, katá + ἀράσσω, arássō, 'to strike, dash')
κατέρεαι 2SG MID	katéreai	'you sit, are seated; sit down!'	Att. κάθησαι (káthēsai), κάθισαι (káthisai)
κίβος	kíbos	'speechless, dumb; wooden box, chest'	Att. ἐνεός (eneós, 'speechless'); κιβωτός (kibōtós, 'chest, ark')
κιδνόν	kidnón	'here, hither'	Att. ἐνθάδε (entháde)
κόρζα, κορζία	kórza, korzía	'heart'	Att. καρδία (kardía); Ion. καρδίη (kardíē); Hom. κραδίη (kradíē); Aeol. κάρζα (kárza)
κύβος	kúbos	'saucer, bowl, dish'	Att. τρύβλιον (trúblion) (cf. Att. κύβος, kúbos, 'cube, die')
λιμήν	limḗn	'agora, marketplace; place of resort, haunt'	Thess. λιμήν (limḗn, 'marketplace'); Att. ἀγορά (agorá, 'marketplace'), ἐνδιατριβή (endiatribḗ, 'haunt') (cf. Att. λιμήν, limḗn, 'harbour, port')
μοχοῖ LOC.SG	mokhoî	'inside, within'	Att. ἐντός (entós), μυχοῖ (mukhoî, LOC.SG of μυχός, mukhós, 'innermost part, recess')
σάπιθος	sápithos	'sacrifice'	Att. θυσία (thusía)
σάσαι AOR INF	sásai	'to seat; sit down'	Att. καθίσαι (kathísai); cf. poetic θάσσω (thássō, 'to sit'), θῶκος (thôkos, 'seat, backless throne')
σές 2SG AOR	sés	'you escaped notice; were hidden'	Att. ἔλαθες (élathes, 2SG AOR of λανθάνω, lanthánō)
σίαἱ AOR INF	síhai	'to spit; cast out'	Att. πτύσαι (ptúsai); cf. Att. σίαλον (síalon, 'saliva, spittle')
σοάνα	soána	'axe'	Att. ἀξίνη (axínē)
στροπά	stropá	'lightning flash'	Att. ἀστραπή (astrapḗ); Hom. στεροπή (steropḗ)
ὕεσι, ὕεσις	húesi, húesis	'garment; clothing, apparel'	Att. and Koine στολή (stolḗ), ἀμφίεσις (amphíesis); cf. Cypr. ὑεστάκα (huestáka, 'raiment' in Hsch.)
Φάπη	Phápē	'the Paphian' (epithet of Aphrodite at Paphos)	Att. Παφία (Paphía)

== See also ==
- Hesychius of Alexandria
- Cypriot Greek for the modern variety of Greek spoken on Cyprus

== Bibliography ==
- A History of Ancient Greek: From the Beginnings to Late Antiquity- Arcado-Cypriot by A.Panayotou
- C. M. Bowra Homeric Words in Arcadian Inscriptions
- Janko, Richard (2018). "The Greek Dialects in the Palatial and Post-Palatial Late Bronze Age". Studies in Ancient Greek Dialects: From Central Greece to the Black Sea. De Gruyter. pp. 107–130. doi:10.1515/9783110532135-007. ISBN 978-3-11-053081-0.
- van Beek, Lucien (2022). "Greek" (PDF). In Olander, Thomas (ed.). The Indo-European Language Family: A Phylogenetic Perspective. Cambridge University Press. pp. 173–201. doi:10.1017/9781108758666. ISBN 978-1-108-49979-8. S2CID 161016819.
- Yves Duhoux. Introduction aux dialectes grecs anciens. Lounain-la-Neuve: Cabay, 1983 ISBN 2-87077-177-0
- Rüdiger Schmitt. Einführung in die griechischen Dialekte. Darmstadt: Wissenschaftliche Buchgesellschaft, 1977 ISBN 3-534-05672-8
- Markus Egetmeyer. Le dialecte grec ancien de Chypre. 2 vols., vol. 1: Grammaire; vol. 2: Répertoire des inscriptions en syllabaire chypro-grec. Berlin–NY: De Gruyter, 2010.
