= Alpha privative =

Prefix expressing negation or absence

An alpha privative or, rarely, privative a (from Latin alpha prīvātīvum, from Ancient Greek α στερητικόν) is the prefix a- or an- (before vowels) that is used in Indo-European languages such as Sanskrit and Greek and in words borrowed therefrom to express negation or absence, for example the English words of Greek origin atypical, anesthetic, and analgesic, as well as the English word of Sanskrit origin ahimsa (ahinsa).

It is derived from a Proto-Indo-European syllabic nasal *n̥-, the zero ablaut grade of the negation *ne, i.e. /n/ used as a vowel. For this reason, it usually appears as an- before vowels (e.g. an-alphabetism, an-esthesia, an-archy). It shares the same root with the Greek prefix nē- or ne-, in Greek νη- or νε-, that is also privative (e.g. ne-penthe).

It is not to be confused with, among other things, an alpha copulative (e.g. a-delphós) or the prefix an- (i.e. the preposition aná with ecthlipsis or elision of its final vowel before a following vowel; e.g. an-ode).

== Cognates ==
=== Sanskrit ===
The same prefix appears in Sanskrit, also as a- before consonants; and an- before vowels (written अ and अन्, respectively in Devanagari).

=== Latin ===
In Latin, the cognate prefix is in-, which leaves its traces in English words like invisible and inaccessible, and in its assimilated form in words like irresistible, irrelevant, irresponsible, illegitimate, illegal, illiterate. The prepositional prefix in- is unrelated.

=== Germanic languages ===
In English and other West Germanic languages, the cognate is un- (or on-).

In North Germanic languages, the -n- has disappeared and Old Norse has ú- (e.g. ú-dáins-akr), Danish and Norwegian have u-, whereas Swedish uses o- (pronounced [u]), and Icelandic and Faroese use the related ó-.

== Homonym ==
The prefix ἁ- ha- (also ἀ- a- from psilosis), copulative a, is nearly homonymous with privative a, but originates from Proto-Indo-European *sm̥.

== See also ==
- Copulative a
