= Erastes =

Erastes may refer to:

- Erastes (Ancient Greece), an adult male in a relationship with a younger male
- Erastes (author) (born 1959), English pseudonymous writer
- Erastes Fulmen, a character in the TV series Rome
