= Achaean Doric Greek =

Two dialects with this name

Achaean Doric Greek refers either to the Northwest Doric dialect spoken in Achaea, or the common dialect used in the decrees of the Achaean League during the Hellenistic period.

== Achaean Doric ==
The Achaean Doric dialect spoken in Achaea in the NW Peloponnese, on the islands of Cephalonia and Zakynthos in the Ionian Sea and in the Achaean colonies of Magna Graecia in Southern Italy, including Sybaris and Crotone. This strict Doric dialect was later subject to the influence of mild Doric spoken in Corinthia. It survived to 350 BC. According to Hesychius, Achaeans means "the Greeks but foremost those inhabiting part of the Peloponnese, called Achaea", and he gives these words under the ethnic Achaeans:

- καιρότερον kairoteron (Attic: ἐνωρότερον enôroteron) "earlier" (kairos time, enôros early cf. Horae)
- κεφαλίδας kephalidas (Attic: κόρσαι korsai) "sideburns" (kephalides was also an alternative for epalxeis 'bastions' in Greek proper)
- σιαλίς sialis (Attic: βλέννος blennos) (cf. blennorrhea) slime, mud (Greek sialon or sielon saliva, modern Greek σάλιο salio)

== Achaean Doric Koine ==
Achaean Doric Koine was the common dialect used in the decrees of the Achaean League. In Arcadia it can be traced very easily because it differs considerably from the old non-Doric Arcadian Greek. In Achaea itself it held its ground until the 1st century BC. The Achaean Doric Koine did not develop the extreme features that are typical of Doric proper or Northwest Doric Koine.

== Sources ==
- Geschichte der Sprachwissenschaften: ein Internationales Handbuch by Sylvain Auroux (2001), p. 442.
- A history of ancient Greek: from the beginnings to late antiquity by Anastasios-Phoivos Christidēs, Maria Arapopoulou (2007), p. 484. ISBN 978-0-521-83307-3.
