= Philoxenus (physician) =

Philoxenus or Claudius Philoxenus (Greek: Φιλόξενος), a Greco-Egyptian surgeon, who, according to Celsus, wrote several valuable volumes on surgery. He is no doubt the same person whose medical formulae are frequently quoted by Galen, and who is called by him Claudius Philoxenus. As he is quoted by Asclepiades Pharmacion, he must have lived in or before the 1st century. He is quoted also by Soranus, Paul of Aegina, Aëtius, and Nicolaus Myrepsus, and also by Avicenna.
