= Philoxenus of Alexandria =

Ancient Greek linguist

- Φιλόξενος
- Occupation: linguist

Philoxenus of Alexandria (Note: Ancient Greek: Φιλόξενος, romanized: Philoxenos.) was an Ancient Greek linguist ("grammarian") who lived and worked in Alexandria.

== Biography ==
He was born and lived in Alexandria.

== Career ==
He studied morphology, etymology, lexicography, dialectology, metrics and Homeric criticism.

He taught in Rome in the second half of the 1st century BC. He took part in the polemics between analogists and anomalists, and influenced contemporaries, including Varro.

== Bibliography ==
He is the author of a number of notable books. He wrote a treatise on the Laconian dialect.

Some of his best known works were republished in 1976 by De Gruyter as The fragments of the grammarian Philoxenus (German: Die Fragmente des Grammatikers Philoxenos).
