= Blennorrhea =

Mucous discharge

Blennorrhea is mucous discharge, especially from the urethra or vagina (that is, mucus vaginal discharge). Blennorrhagia is an excess of such discharge, often specifically referring to that seen in gonorrhea.
