= Copulative a =

Ancient Greek prefix

The copulative a (also a copulativum, a athroistikon) is the prefix ἁ- (ha-) or α- (a-) used to express unity in Ancient Greek, derived from Proto-Indo-European *sm̥-, cognate to English same (see also symbel).

An example is ἀδελφός (adelphós 'brother'), from *sm̥-gʷelbhos, literally meaning 'from the same womb' (compare Delphi).

In Proto-Greek, the Proto-Indo-European phoneme *s at the beginning of a word became *h by debuccalization and syllabic *m̥ became *a, giving the combined form *ha-. The initial *h was sometimes lost by psilosis or Grassmann's law.

Cognate forms in other languages preserve the original Proto-Indo-European *s. For example, the Sanskrit prefix saṃ- occurs in the name of the language, सं॒स्कृ॒त saṃ-s-kṛtá, literally 'put together'. Less exact cognates include English same and some, and Latin simul 'at the same time' and similis 'similar'.

Other words in Greek are related, including ᾰ̔́μᾰ (háma 'at the same time'), ὁμός (homós 'same'), and εἷς (heís 'one'; from Proto-Indo-European *sem-s).

== See also ==
- Privative a
