= Homeric Greek =

Form of the Greek language found in Homer

- Era: c. 700 BCE-c. 500 CE
- Language family: Indo-European: Hellenic; Greek; (disputed); Attic–Ionic; Ionic; Homeric Greek
- Early form: Proto-Greek
- Writing system: Greek alphabet

Language codes
- ISO 639-3: –
- Linguist List: grc-hom
- Glottolog: None

Homeric Greek is the form of the Greek language used in the Iliad and Odyssey, traditionally attributed to Homer, and the Homeric Hymns. It is a literary dialect of Ancient Greek consisting mainly of an archaic form of the Ionic dialect, with some Aeolic features, a few from the Arcadocypriot dialect, and a written form influenced by the Attic dialect. It was later named Epic Greek because it was used as the language of epic poetry, typically in dactylic hexameter, by poets such as Hesiod and Theognis of Megara. Some compositions in Epic Greek date from as late as the 5th century CE, and it only fell out of use by the end of classical antiquity.

== Main features ==
In the following description, only forms that differ from those of later Greek are discussed. Omitted forms can usually be predicted from patterns seen in Ionic Greek.

=== Phonology ===
Homeric Greek is like Ionic Greek, and unlike Classical Attic, in shifting almost all cases of long ᾱ to η.

Examples of Homeric Greek phonology
Homeric	Attic	English
Τροίη	Τροίᾱ	Troy (nominative singular)
ὥρη	ὥρᾱ	an hour (nominative singular)
πύλῃσι	πύλαις/πύλαισι	gates (dative plural)

Exceptions include nouns like θεᾱ́ ("a goddess"), and the genitive plural of first-declension nouns and the genitive singular of masculine first-declension nouns. For example θεᾱ́ων ("of goddesses"), and Ἀτρεΐδᾱο ("of the son of Atreus").

=== Nouns ===
First declension
The nominative singular of most feminine nouns ends in -η, rather than long -ᾱ, even after ρ, ε, and ι (an Ionic feature): χώρη for χώρᾱ. However, θεᾱ́ and some names end in long -ᾱ.
Some masculine nouns have a nominative singular in short -ᾰ rather than -ης (ναύτης, Ἀτρεΐδης): ἱππότᾰ for Attic ἱππότης.
The genitive singular of masculine nouns ends in -ᾱο or -εω (rarely -ω; only after vowels), rather than -ου: Ἀτρεΐδᾱο or Ἀτρεΐδεω for Attic Ἀτρείδου. (Note: Some suggest that -ᾱο may have originally been the more expected -ηο, with -ηο later being transcribed -ᾱο under the influence of other (literary) dialects, whilst others suggest that -ᾱο may have been an Aeolic form. Alternatively, it may be that as of the Homeric period, original ᾱ had not yet merged with η in front of ο or ω, and was instead still pronounced [æː]. Then, in later Ionic, when vernacular [æːo] and [æːɔː] had disappeared via metathesis to [eɔː], the metrically-constrained ᾱο of epic poetry came to be pronounced [aːo]. (See λᾱός and Ποσειδᾱ́ων for expected ληός and Ποσειδήων.))
The genitive plural usually ends in -ᾱων or -εων (sometimes -ων): νυμφᾱ́ων or νυμφέων for Attic νυμφῶν. (Note: -ᾱων for expected -ηων would occur for the reasons given in Note 1.)
The dative plural almost always ends in -ῃσι(ν) (rarely -ῃς or -αις): πύλῃσι(ν) or πύλῃς for Attic πύλαις.

Second declension
Genitive singular: ends in -οιο, as well as -ου: πεδίοιο, as well as πεδίου.
Genitive and dative dual: ends in -οιϊν: ἵπποιϊν for Attic ἵπποιν.
Dative plural: ends in -οισι(ν) (rarely -οις): φύλλοισι(ν) for Attic φύλλοις.
Third declension
Accusative singular: ends in -ιν, as well as -ιδα: γλαυκῶπιν as well as γλαυκώπιδα.
Dative plural: ends in -εσσι(ν) (rarely -εσι(ν)) in addition to -σι(ν): πόδεσσι(ν) or ἔπεσσι(ν).
Homeric Greek lacks the quantitative metathesis present in later Greek (except in certain α-stem genitive plurals and certain masculine α-stem genitive singulars):
- Homeric βασιλῆος instead of βασιλέως, πόληος instead of πόλεως
- βασιλῆα instead of βασιλέᾱ
- βασιλῆας instead of βασιλέᾱς
- βασιλήων instead of βασιλέων
Homeric Greek sometimes uses different endings:
- πόληος alternates with πόλιος

A note on nouns:

- After short vowels, the reflex of Proto-Greek *ts can alternate between -σ- and -σσ- in Homeric Greek. This can be of metrical use. For example, τόσος and τόσσος are equivalent; μέσος and μέσσος; ποσί and ποσσί.
- A relic of the Proto-Greek instrumental case, the ending -φι(ν) (-οφι(ν)) can be used for the dative singular and plural of nouns and adjectives (occasionally for the genitive singular and plural, as well). For example, βίηφι (...by force), δακρυόφιν (...with tears), and ὄρεσφιν (...in the mountains).

=== Pronouns ===
First-person pronoun (singular "I", dual "we both", plural "we")
	Singular	Dual	Plural
Nominative	ἐγώ, ἐγών	νῶι, νώ	ἡμεῖς, ἄμμες
Genitive	ἐμεῖο, ἐμέο, ἐμεῦ, μεῦ, ἐμέθεν	νῶιν	ἡμείων, ἡμέων, ἀμμέων
Dative	ἐμοί, μοι	νῶιν	ἡμῖν, ἄμμι(ν)
Accusative	ἐμέ, με	νῶι, νώ	ἡμέας, ἧμας, ἄμμε

Second-person pronoun (singular "thou", dual "ye both", plural "ye")
	Singular	Dual	Plural
Nominative	σύ, τύνη	σφῶϊ, σφώ	ὑμεῖς, ὔμμες
Genitive	σεῖο, σέο, σεῦ, σευ, σέθεν, τεοῖο	σφῶϊν, σφῷν	ὑμέων, ὑμείων, ὔμμέων
Dative	σοί, τοι, τεΐν	σφῶϊν, σφῷν	ὑμῖν, ὔμμι(ν)
Accusative	σέ	σφῶϊ, σφώ	ὑμέας, ὔμμε

Third-person pronoun (singular "he, she, it", dual "they both", plural "they")
	Singular	Dual	Plural
Nominative	—	σφωέ	σφεῖς
Genitive	οὗ, εἷο, ἕο, εὗ, ἕθεν	σφωΐν	σφείων, σφέων
Dative	ἑοῖ, οἱ	σφωΐν	σφι(ν), σφίσι(ν)
Accusative	ἕ, ἑέ, μιν	σφωέ	σφε, σφέας, σφας

- Third-person singular pronoun ("he, she, it") (the relative) or rarely singular article ("the"): ὁ, ἡ, τό
- Third-person plural pronoun ("they") (the relative) or rarely plural article ("the"): nominative οἰ, αἰ, τοί, ταί, dative τοῖς, τοῖσι, τῇς, τῇσι, ταῖς.

Interrogative pronoun, singular and plural ("who, what, which")
Nominative	τίς
Accusative	τίνα
Genitive	τέο, τεῦ
Dative	τέῳ
Genitive	τέων

=== Verbs ===
Person endings
-ν appears rather than -σαν. For example, ἔσταν for ἔστησαν in the third-person plural active.
The third plural middle/passive often ends in -αται or -ατο; for example, ἥατο is equivalent to ἧντο.

Tenses
Future: Generally remains uncontracted. For example, ἐρέω appears instead of ἐρῶ or τελέω instead of τελῶ.
Present or imperfect: These tenses sometimes take iterative form with the suffix -σκ- before the ending. For example, φύγεσκον: 'they kept on running away'
Aorist or imperfect: Both tenses can occasionally drop their augments. For example, βάλον may appear instead of ἔβαλον, and ἔμβαλε may appear instead of ἐνέβαλε.
Homeric Greek does not have a historical present tense, but rather uses injunctives. Injunctives are replaced by the historical present in the post-Homeric writings of Thucydides and Herodotus.
Subjunctive
The subjunctive appears with a short vowel. Thus, the form ἴομεν, rather than ἴωμεν.
The second singular middle subjunctive ending appears as both -ηαι and -εαι.
The third singular active subjunctive ends in -σι(ν). Thus, we see the form φορεῇσι, instead of φορῇ.
Occasionally, the subjunctive is used in place of the future and in general remarks.

Infinitive
The infinitive appears with the endings -μεν, -μεναι, and -ναι, in place of -ειν and -ναι. For example, δόμεναι for δοῦναι; ἴμεν instead of ἰέναι; ἔμεν, ἔμμεν, or ἔμμεναι for εἶναι; and ἀκουέμεν(αι) in place of ἀκούειν.

Contracted verbs
In contracted verbs, where Attic employs an -ω-, Homeric Greek will use -οω- or -ωω- in place of -αο-. For example, Attic ὁρῶντες becomes ὁρόωντες.
Similarly, in places where -αε- contracts to -α- or -αει- contracts to -ᾳ-, Homeric Greek will show either αα or αᾳ.

=== Adverbs ===
Adverbial suffixes
-δε conveys a sense of 'to where'; πόλεμόνδε 'to war'
-δον conveys a sense of 'how'; κλαγγηδόν 'with cries'
-θεν conveys a sense of 'from where'; ὑψόθεν 'from above'
-θι conveys a sense of 'where'; ὑψόθι 'on high'

=== Particles ===
ἄρα, ἄρ, ῥα 'so' or 'next' (transition)
τε 'and' (a general remark or a connective)

Emphatics
δή 'indeed'
ἦ 'surely'
περ 'just' or 'even'
τοι 'I tell you ...' (assertion)

=== Other features ===
In most circumstances, Homeric Greek did not have available a true definite article. Ὁ, ἡ, τό and their inflected forms do occur, but they are in origin and usually used as demonstrative pronouns.

== Vocabulary ==
Homer (in the Iliad and the Odyssey) uses about 9,000 words, of which 1,382 are proper names. Of the 7,618 remaining words 2,307 are hapax legomena. According to classical scholar Clyde Pharr, "the Iliad has 1097 hapax legomena, while the Odyssey has 868". Others have defined the term differently, however, and count as few as 303 in the Iliad and 191 in the Odyssey.

== Sample ==
The Iliad, lines 1–7

Μῆνιν ἄειδε, θεά, Πηληϊάδεω Ἀχιλῆος
οὐλομένην, ἣ μυρί’ Ἀχαιοῖς ἄλγε’ ἔθηκε,
πολλὰς δ’ ἰφθίμους ψυχὰς Ἄϊδι προΐαψεν
ἡρώων, αὐτοὺς δὲ ἑλώρια τεῦχε κύνεσσιν
οἰωνοῖσί τε πᾶσι· Διὸς δ’ ἐτελείετο βουλή·
ἐξ οὗ δὴ τὰ πρῶτα διαστήτην ἐρίσαντε
Ἀτρεΐδης τε ἄναξ ἀνδρῶν καὶ δῖος Ἀχιλλεύς.

Theodore Alois Buckley (1860):

Sing, O goddess, the destructive wrath of Achilles, son of Peleus, which brought countless woes upon the Greeks, and hurled many valiant souls of heroes down to Hades, and made themselves a prey to dogs and to all birds but the will of Jove was being accomplished, from the time when Atrides, king of men, and noble Achilles, first contending, were disunited.

== Authors ==
- Homer
- Hesiod
- Theognis of Megara
- Apollonius Rhodius
- Quintus Smyrnaeus
- Nonnus
- Author(s) of the Homeric Hymns

=== Poets of the Epic Cycle ===
- Stasinus
- Arctinus of Miletus
- Lesches
- Agias
- Eumelus of Corinth
- Eugammon of Cyrene
- Musaeus of Athens

== See also ==
- Ancient Greek dialects
- Epic Cycle
- Homer's works
- Hesiod's works

== Bibliography ==
- Pharr, Clyde. Homeric Greek: A Book for Beginners. University of Oklahoma Press, Norman, new edition, 1959. Revised edition: John Wright, 1985. ISBN 0-8061-1937-3. First edition of 1920 in public domain.
- Stanford, William Bedell (1959) [1947]. "Introduction, Grammatical Introduction". Homer: Odyssey I-XII. Vol. 1 (2nd ed.). Macmillan Education Ltd. pp. ix–lxxxvi. ISBN 1-85399-502-9.
