= Acesander's cup =

(c.750–720 BCE) Greek inscription

Cup of Acesander
- Type: Skyphos
- Material: clay
- Writing: Greek alphabet
- Created: c. 750–720 BC
- Period/culture: Archaic Greece
- Discovered: 2003–2004; Methoni, Central Macedonia, Greece

The Cup of Acesander (also Hakesandros or Hakesander) is a drinking cup from ancient Methone, a city in Macedonia (corresponding to modern Methoni, Pieria), that contains one of the earliest found inscriptions in the Greek alphabet. Dated from the first half of the eighth century BC (c. 750–720), the pot was made for use at symposia and was discovered during the archaeological excavations of 2003–04. The inscription, written in the Euboean alphabet, functions as an ownership tag and includes a short humorous curse in iambic verse that warns drinkers against stealing the cup. Along with similar inscriptions of the same period, the text is seen as an early indication of literacy and sympotic poetry in ancient Greece. The cup has been important for the study of the early Greek alphabet and epigraphy.

== Artifact ==
The cup of Acesander, identified as a skyphos, was discovered along with several other inscribed drinking vessels in a sealed deposit in Methoni, Pieria. A contemporary of the earlier discovered and better preserved Nestor's Cup, the vessel is securely dated to the first half of the eighth century BC. Nelson (2023) writes that the discovery of Acesander's cup confirms that poetry was written by the mid-eighth century BC; Lopez-Ruiz (2022) dates the cup between 750 and 735 BC. Janko (2015) places Acesander's cup among the other early Greek alphabet writings in 730 BC or earlier, while Tzifopoulos, Bessios, and Kotsonas (2017) date it between c. 730 and 720 BC. The existence of pottery with Euboean script in Methone from this particular date appears to support Plutarch's accounts that the city was founded by Eretrian settlers in the first half of the eighth century BC. This evidence from Methone is also in line with the theory that the Euboeans likely played an important role in the recording and diffusion of Homeric poetry.

== Inscription ==
The inscription on Acesander's cup parallels that of several contemporary drinking vessels including the Nestor's Cup, both of which testify to an early poetic culture that accompanied the ritualized drinking of wine. The cup of Acesander showcases a carefully written inscription running around the vessel along a decorative band (Note: Cazzato, Prodi & Obbink 2016, p. 4; Day 2019, pp. 234–235 notes that only the final five letters appear to dip beneath the straight line; either a misculculation of space by the writer or an intentional choice to indicate where one should begin reading.) that was created by a skilled inscriber. This early epigraphic evidence points to the beginnings of literacy in ancient Greece, as the alphabet, epigraphic formulas, and techniques, not strictly confined to a bureaucratic environment, gradually begin to extend to aspects of everyday life, most notably in sympotic contexts, and are shared by individuals of different social and economic backgrounds. The inscription appears to follow an iambic rhythm (υ – υ – υ –). It consists of a short iambic dimeter ot trimeter, possibly the earliest recorded example of this kind, that follows the initial ownership tag in prose. The language indicates that the text was composed in a playful tone and that the cup was meant to be used in a sympotic context. The cup follows the conventional formula of a witty ownership tag, here taking the form of a good-humored curse, which became a common epigraphic trope in ancient Greek pottery, particularly on vessels meant to be used in a friendly circle of symposiasts.

ΗΑΚΕΣΑΝΔΡΟ ΕΜ[Ι ... ]ΕΙΤΕΤΟ[ ... ]ΜΕ Κ[ ... ]ΑΤΟΝ ΣΤΕΡΕΣ[ΕΤ]ΑΙ.

HĒAKESANDRO EM[I ... ]EITETO[ ... ]ME K[ ... ]ATON STERES[ET]AI

I belong to Hakesandros; [whoever steals me from him], will be deprived of/ lose his [money/eyes].

Although preserved in fragments, the text has been approximately reconstructed following the language of similar vessels of the same period. Comparative interpretation of sympotic inscriptions indicates that Acesander's cup is not an isolated example, but part of an epigraphic tradition with wide diffusion in space and time. The initial verb εἰμί "I am" indicates that the cup uses the familiar formula of the speaking object i.e. "I belong to X". A probable restoration of the ownership tag includes Ηακεσάνδρο εμ[ί ποτέριον] "I am Hakesaner's [cup]". The final verb, which is securely restored as στερήσ[ετ]αι (sterēs[et]ai, "will be deprived", the third singular future form of στεροῦμαι), is preceded by the word ]ατον or ]ατων, which is commonly reconstructed as [ομμ]άτων (ommatōn, "eyes") or [χρημ]άτων (chrēmatōn, "property, money". (Note: The word was engraved as ]ΑΤΟΝ; Tzifopoulos 2023, p. 495 provides the spelling with omicron (ο) as it is originally found on the cup, while Janko 2015, p. 3 renders it with an omega (ω) as it would be expected in genitive plural according to Greek grammatical rules.) Subsequently, based on the vocabulary of vessels with similar inscriptions, the text can be approximately reconstructed as:

hΑκεσάνδρο ἐμ[ί - - μεδές - - (αν)κλε]ττέτο, [ὅς δ' ἄν] με κ[λέφσει, ὀμμ]άτων στερήσ[ετ]αι. (Note: Proposed reconstruction by Angelos Matthaiou, in Kotsonas, Bessios & Tzifopoulos 2012, p. 343 and Papas 2017, p. 291, note 12)

Translation:

hΑκεσάνδρο ἐμ[ί ... ... ... ]ει τετό[μενον?] με κ[λέπτες, ὀμμ]άτων στερήσ[ετ]ται. (Note: Proposed reconstruction by Kyriakos Tsantsanoglou, in Kotsonas, Bessios & Tzifopoulos 2012, p. 343 and Papas 2017, p. 291, note 12)

According to the analysis and proposed reconstructions, a probable translation would be "I am Hakesandros' cup, no one shall steal me, because whoever steals me, will be deprived of his eyes/ money". A different proposal follows that, if Acesander happened to be a medic, as his name may suggest, (Note: Hakesandros translates as "healer of men"; in antiquity such professions tended to be hereditary.) the cup may have promised to relieve the drinker from his pains; πημ]άτων (pēmatōn). The script can be identified as Euboean and bears most common features with the Eretrian. These features include the letter mu (Μ μ) which is written with five, instead of the standard four, strokes and the letter delta (Δ δ) which is rounded above and has an angle below, both features also appearing on the Nestor's Cup from Pithekoussai. Rare in Euboean is the alpha that is rounded on the right side, although it does appear in Ereteria.

== See also ==
- Akanthos curse tablet
- Derveni papyrus
- Dipylon inscription
- Phiale of Megara
- Pydna curse tablets

== Sources ==
- Cazzato, Vanessa; Prodi, Enrico Emanuele; Obbink, Dirk (2016). The Cup of Song: Studies on Poetry and the Symposion. Oxford University Press. ISBN 9780199687688.
- Clay, Jenny Strauss; Malkin, Irad; Tzifopoulos, Yannis Z. (2017). Panhellenes at Methone: Graphê in Late Geometric and Protoarchaic Methone, Macedonia (ca 700 BCE). De Gruyter. ISBN 9783110515695.
  - Oikonomaki, Niki. "Local 'Literacies' in the Making: Early Alphabetic Writing and Modern Literacy Theories". In Clay, Malkin & Tzifopoulos (2017).
  - Papas, Alexandra. "Form Follows Function? Toward an Aesthetics of Early Greek Inscriptions". In Clay, Malkin & Tzifopoulos (2017).
  - Wecowski, Marek. "Wine and the Early History of the Greek Alphabet. Early Greek Vase-Inscriptions and the Symposion". In Clay, Malkin & Tzifopoulos (2017).
- Day, Joseph (2019). "The Origins of Greek Epigram: The Unity of Inscription and Objects". In Henriksen, Christer (ed.). A Companion to Ancient Epigram. Wiley. ISBN 9781118841723.
- Janko, Richard (2015). "From Gabii and Gordion to Eretria and Methone: The Rise of the Greek Alphabet". Bulletin of the Institute of Classical Studies. 58 (1): 1–32. doi:10.1111/j.2041-5370.2015.12000.x. hdl:2027.42/111984. ISSN 2041-5370.
- Kotsonas, Antonis; Bessios, Manthos; Tzifopoulos, Yiannis (2012). Methone Pierias I: Inscriptions, Graffiti and Trademarks on Geometric and Archaic Pottery from the 'Hypogeion' of Methone Pierias in Macedonia (in Greek). Centre for the Greek Language. ISBN 9789607779519.
- Lopez-Ruiz, Carolina (2022). Phoenicians and the Making of the Mediterranean. Harvard University Press. ISBN 9780674269958.
- Morris, Sarah P.; Papadopoulos, John K. (2023). Ancient Methone, 2003-2013: Excavations by Matthaios Bessios, Athena Athanassiadou, and Konstantinos Noulas. Cotsen Institute of Archaeology Press. ISBN 9781950446339.
  - Tzifopoulos, Yiannis. "Inscriptions, Graffiti/Dipinti, and (Trade)Marks at Methone (ca.700 BC)". In Morris & Papadopoulos (2023).
- Nelson, Thomas J. (2023). Markers of Allusion in Archaic Greek Poetry. Cambridge University Press. ISBN 9781316514375.
- Tzifopoulos, Yiannis; Bessios, Manthos; Kotsonas, Aggelos (2017). "Panhellenes at Methone, Pieria (ca 700 BCE)". In Charalambidou, Xenia; Morgan, Catherine (eds.). Interpreting the Seventh Century BC: Tradition and Innovation. Archaeopress Publishing. ISBN 9781784915735.
