= Phiale of Megara =

Ancient Greek silver phiale

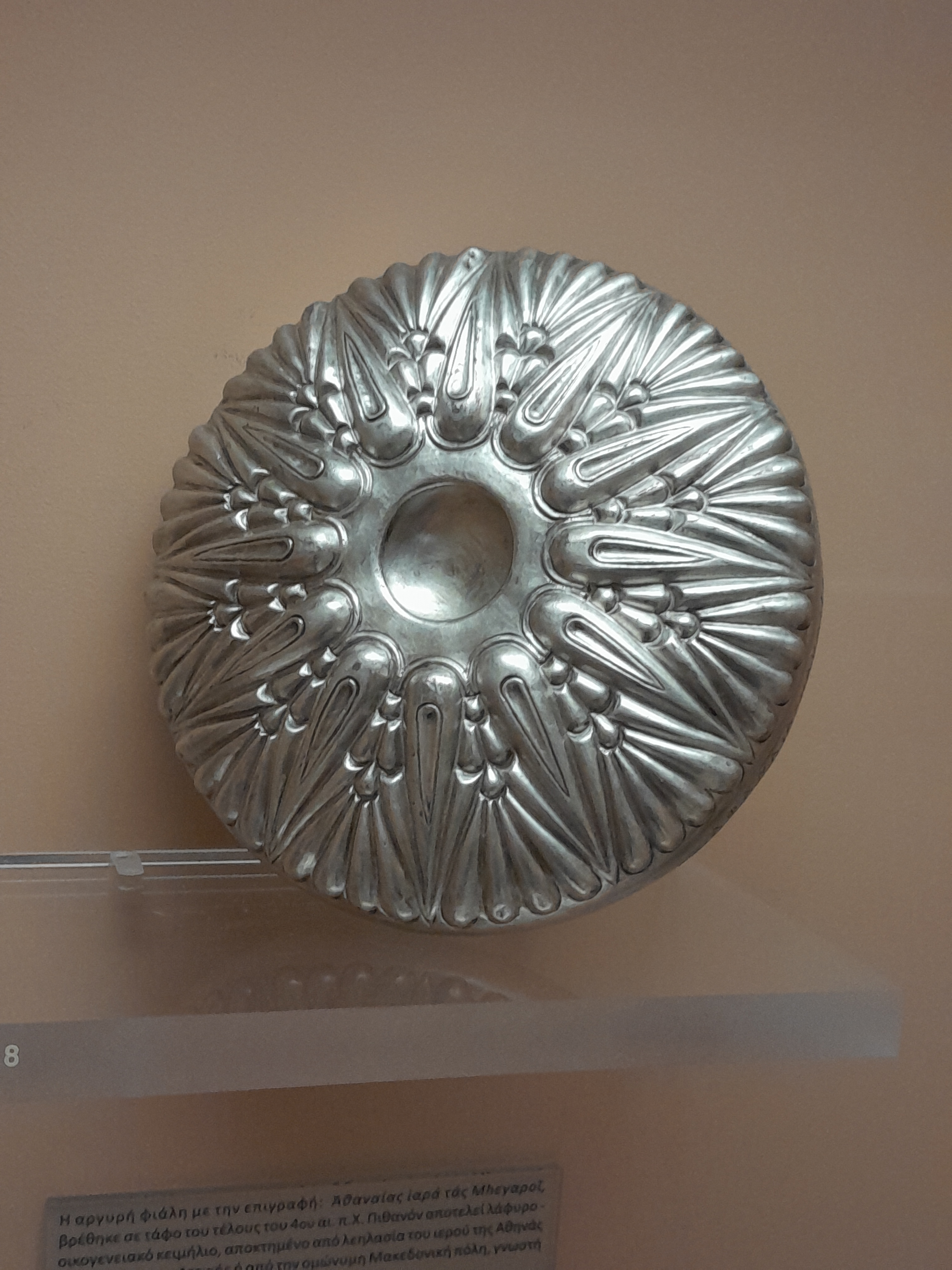
- The phiale of Megara in 2024
- Type: Phiale
- Material: silver
- Writing: Greek alphabet
- Created: c. 500 BC
- Discovered: Kozani, Western Macedonia, Greece
- Present location: Archaeological Museum of Kozani

The Phiale of Megara is an ancient Greek silver phiale, a libation vessel, found in a tomb in Elimiotis, in Upper Macedonia near present-day Kozani. Dated from c. 500 BC, it bears a one-line inscription in Doric Greek, which reads "sacred to the Athena of Megara" (Αθαναιας : ιαρα : τας Μhεγαροι, Athanaias : iara : tas Mhegaroi). Today it is kept in the Archaeological Museum of Kozani, in northwestern Greece.

== Description ==
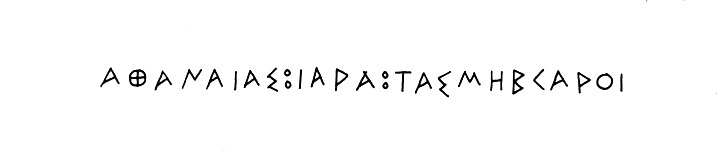
Reproduction of the inscription, after L. H. Jeffery, The local scripts of archaic Greece (Oxford, 1961). Note the B-like glyph for E in the sixth letter from the right.

On the basis of the reference to Megara and its well-known sanctuary of Athena, its provenance is usually assumed to be of that city, situated in southern Greece, and it is dated to the early part of the fifth century. Among the characteristics of its writing system is an archaic, B-like glyph shape for the letter E (epsilon), a feature found regularly in early inscriptions from Megara and nearby Corinth.

However, James L. O'Neil, following Hammond and Griffith, conjectures that the inscription could also have been written locally in Macedonia. In this case, it would constitute the earliest known example of a local Greek dialect written in Macedonia, and would confirm the hypothesis―derived from another archaeological find, the Pella curse tablet―that ancient Macedonian Greek was of Doric Greek nature. O'Neil argues that there is evidence that a place in Macedonia was also called Megara, something that is also supported by Plutarch's records, and that the inscription fails to display the specifically Megarian archaic shape of Epsilon. However, the notes by L. H. Jefferey for LSAG do show just this archaic Megarian form.

Of the linguistic forms in the inscription, the word ἰαρά ('sacred') can be identified unambiguously as Doric. The archaic form of the name of the Goddess Athena, Ἀθαναία(ς), is less distinctive and could occur in any dialect except Ionic, while the genitive article form τᾶς points to any dialect except Ionic and Attic. The form of the name Megara, with initial mh-, reflects its etymological origin *sm- and is found frequently in inscriptions from Megara but also elsewhere.

== See also ==
Other notable archaeological findings from Greek Macedonia:

- Acesander's cup
- Akanthos curse tablet
- Derveni papyrus
- Pydna curse tablets
- Pella curse tablet

== Sources ==
- Miller, Gary (2013). Ancient Greek Dialects and Early Authors, Introduction to the Dialect Mixture in Homer, with Notes on Lyric and Herodotus. De Gruyter. ISBN 9781614512950.
- O'Neil, James L. (2006). "Doric Forms in Macedonian Inscriptions". Glotta. 82. Göttingen, Germany: Vandenhoeck und Ruprecht: 192–210.
