= Makrygialos =

Makrygialos or Makrigialos may refer to:

- Makry Gialos, a former municipality in Crete
- Makrygialos, Pieria, a village and former municipal district in northern Greece
