= Pydna curse tablets =

- Material: Lead
- Created: 4th century BC
- Discovered: 1994–1997; Pydna, Central Macedonia, Greece
- Present location: Archaeological Museum of Thessaloniki
- Language: Ancient Greek

The Pydna curse tablets are a collection of six texts or catalogues written in Ancient Greek that were found at the ruins of Pydna, a prominent city of ancient Macedon, between 1994 and 1997. They were discovered during the archaeological excavations of the Makrygialos cemetery and were first published by Curbera and Jordan in 2003. Each tablet contains a curse or magic spell (Ancient Greek: κατάδεσμος, katadesmos), probably all of judicial nature, and has been dated to the 4th century BC. Three of them are merely name catalogues, while the others also contain language which indicates they were meant to influence legal proceedings. The tablets document in total 66 individuals, most of whom bear well-known Greek names. The onomasticon of the tablets can be overall characterized as typically ancient Macedonian (e.g. Amyntas, Philippos, Pausanias etc.). The tablets have had important contribution to modern understanding of ancient Macedonian anthroponymy and prosopography, particularly in the city of Pydna.

== Interpretation ==
Based on the language of the Pydna curse tablets, it is evident that they were occasioned by lawsuits. Though half of them are only name catalogues, it is possible that they were all of judicial nature, intending to influence legal proceedings. All six tablets were placed in graves, reflecting the practice of Greek magicians to place their spell at the sanctuary of a deity or along a recently buried body, securing that the spell would be successfully carried to the underworld. Curse-writing rituals appear to have been well established in Macedonian urban centers well before Philip II conquered the southern Greek mainland, indicating a Macedonian engagement with broader Greek culture and familiarity with its social and ritual practices. The tablets exhibit familiar themes, such as the targeting of the victims' tongues, the verbs of binding down (καταδεσμεύω) and writing down (καταγράφω), as well as the form of columnar name lists. The above indicate that the scribes of Pydna drew from a common pool of cursing expressions, formats, and formulae when constructing their own curse tablets in a Macedonian context. The tablets do not diverge significantly from the standard 4th century Attic expressions and formats, except perhaps for the verb μαίνεται 'to rage', a unique feature for this era, and the verb καταγράφω, similarly rare for Attic curse tablets of this century, but attested in another contemporary Macedonian tablet from Arethousa, as well as in the more well-known curse tablet from Pella.

From a linguistic point of view, the tablets provide nothing unexpected for a 4th-century Macedonian city in close proximity to Thessaly. Local linguistic features are present, such as the shift between pt > kt in proper names (i.e. Ktolemmas for Ptolemmas), the long vowel /ā/, the preposition πέρ for περί, and the doubling of sigma before consonants (i.e. Arisstion etc.). The pressure of the growing Attic-Ionic influence is also visible in features like the conditionals ἂν and εί, and the pronoun ἐκεῖνος. Since the signs of this Attic-Ionic koine are present here within judiciary texts, which are documented throughout the Greek word, it is not certain to what extent they are also reflected in the spoken variety of Pydna. It is uncertain whether documentation of these Attic forms outside of Attica can be seen as an indication of Attic influence on the local variety or as part of a widespread ritual koine. Regarding the onomastics of the tablets, most of the recognizable names are well known throughout the Greek world, some of them are Greek names documented for the first time (hapax), while many are particularly recognized as typically ancient Macedonian. The tablets document in total 66 individuals; a couple of them bear the same names, while a few others have been significantly damaged making the identification of the names impossible.

Magic practices in ancient Macedon are of particular interest, as they shed light on popular religious beliefs and not exclusively on the practices of the Macedonian elites. Though previously ignored as being of minor significance, magic has been proven to be widely practiced throughout the ancient Greek world in conjunction with official religious beliefs. That said, magic remained a marginal practice, largely performed in secret, and associated with the underworld and the daimones (lesser guiding spirits, navigating between the gods and the humans). Curse-writing rituals were performed in the Macedonian capital well before the time of Philip II, and continued to flourish in cities like Pella and Pydna during the time of Macedon's expansion and urbanization. By the mid-4th century BC, neighbouring settlements that had now passed under Macedonian control would go on to yield a handful of curse tablets of their own, including the cities of Arethousa, Oraiokastro, and Akanthos.

== Texts and translation ==
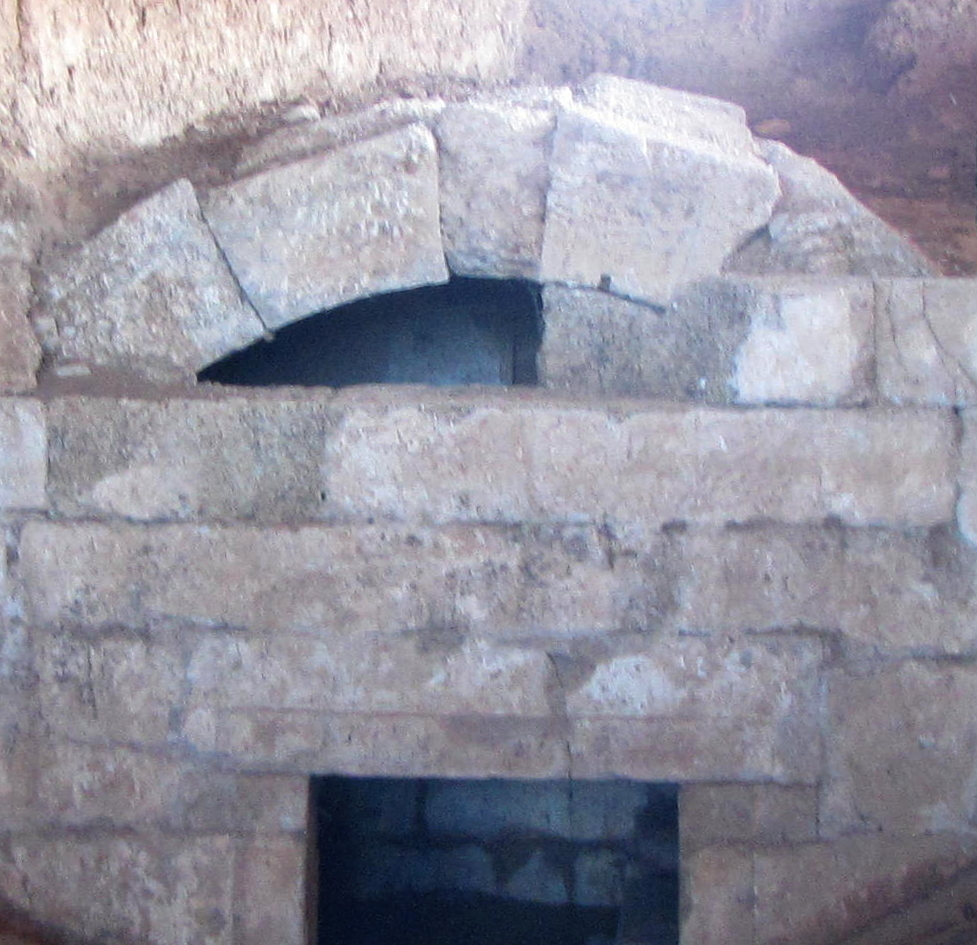
Ancient Macedonian tomb located at the southern necropolis of Pydna.

Pydna tablet I
Greek		Transliteration
1. [--]ΙΝΑ	]ΝΙΚΩΝ	[--]INA	]NIKON
2. Νίκανδρος	]ΥΚΙΤΤΟ[	Nikandros	]YKITTO[
3. Ἑλλάν		Hellan
4. Εὐφάνιος		Euphanios
5. [--]ητος		[--]etos
6. Νικωνίδας		Nikonidas
7. Εὐθύδικος		Euthedikos
8. Λυσίδαμο[ς]		Lysidamos
9. Ἃρπαλος		Harpalos
10. Δωρώς		Doros
11. Ναύτας		Nautas

Saved in preliminary excavation notes, the tablet supplies already known Greek names, among which Harpalos is the one most frequently documented in Macedon. The name Dōrōs is attested for the first time; it is a shortened version of Dōrōndas (Δωρώνδας), bearing the characteristic ending -ώς.

Pydna tablet II
Greek		Transliteration
1. Νίκυλλα	7. Εὐρην[--]	Nikylla	Euren[--]
2. Πολεμοκράτης	8. Βουλόνα	Polemokrates	Boulona
3. Νικόλαος	9. Στρατονίκ[α]	Nikolaos	Stratonik[a?]
4. Θράσων ὁ Νικύλλας	10. Πολυκάστ[α]	Thrason ho Nikyllas	Polykast[a?]
5. Ἱππίας	11. Ἀντιφίλα	Hippias	Antiphila
6. Εὐβούλα	12. Γαλέστας	Euboula	Galestas
	13. Φιλάν		Philan
	14. Τιμοκράτης		Timokrates
	15. Ταρρίας		Tarrias

The tablet consists of two columns and it was written with unusually large letters. Out of the six tablets, it is the only one to include feminine names (e.g. Nikylla, Euboula, Antiphila etc.). Most of the names are well known and have been attested elsewhere. A new name variation is Boulona, connected to Boulonoa (Βουλονόα) that is documented in Thessaly. Similarly, Philan is a local rendition, previously undocumented, of Philaōn (Φιλάων). The endings of number seven, nine, and ten are lost. Potential names for seven could be Eurenoa (Εὐρην[όα]) and Eurenoma (Εὐρην[όμα]), or their equivalent masculine forms. It is more likely that names in nine and ten were feminine (i.e. Stratonika and Polykasta), rather than their less common masculine counterparts Stratonikos and Polykastos.

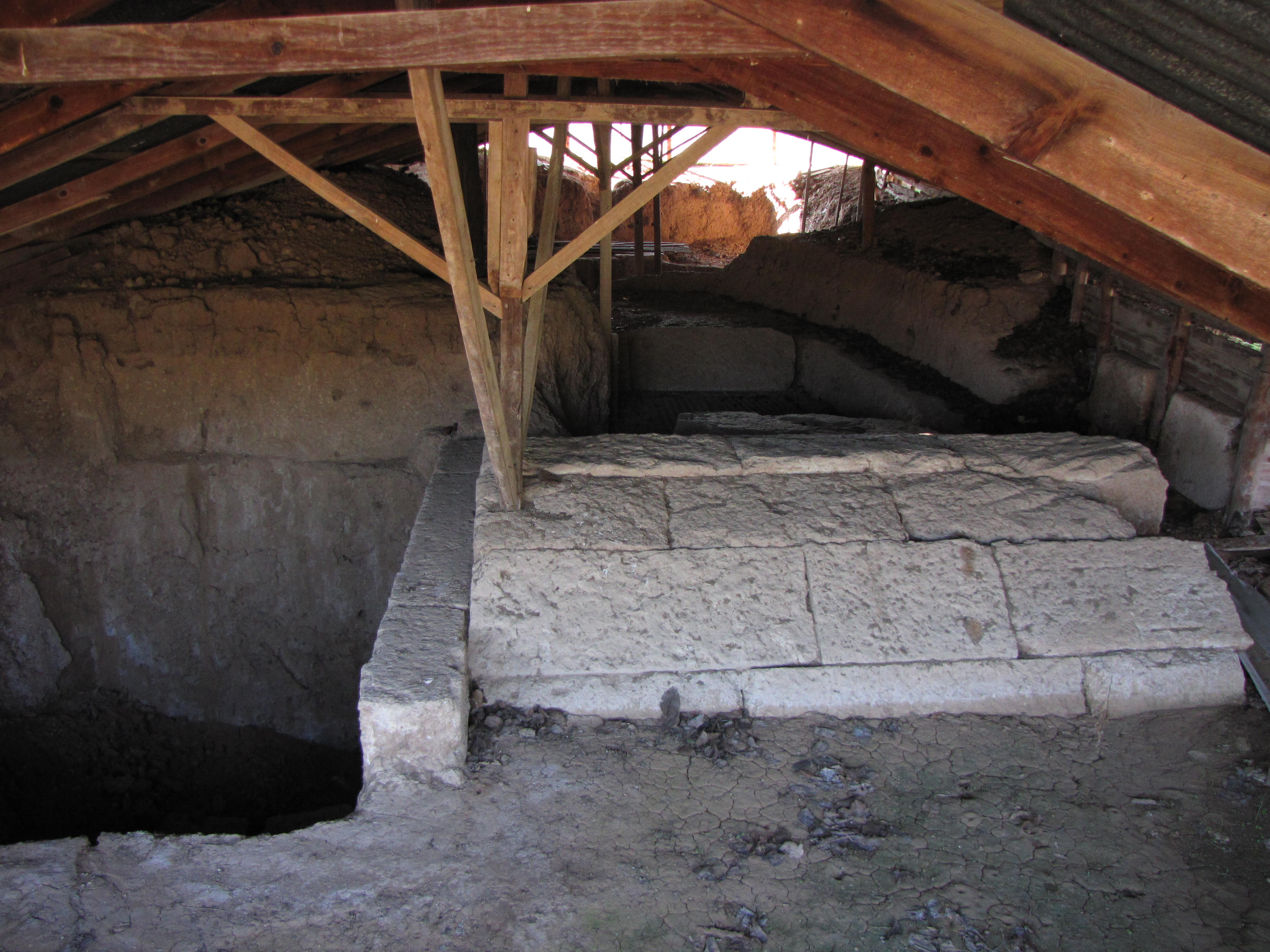
Ancient Macedonian tombs located south of Makrygialos, Pydna necropolis.

Pydna tablet III
Greek	Transliteration
1. Δι[ό]γνητος	Di[o]gnetos
2. Θεύτιμος	Theutimos
3. Παυράτας	Pauratas
4. Κυλλίσ[--]	Kyllis[--]
5. Λ[----]	L[----]

The name Pauratas is attested for the first time; it is derived from pauros (παύρος) 'small' followed by the same suffix as the name Megatas. The name in number four is incomplete, but the stem is formed from the word κυλλός 'club-footed' or 'bandy-legged'.

Pydna tablet IV
Greek		Translation
1. Εὐίππας	5. Ἀμύντωρ	Euippas	Amyntor
	6. Κλέανδρος		Kleandros
2. Σιτάλκα[ς]	7. Μικαλῖνος	Sitalka[s]	Mikalinos
3. Καλλίας	8. [Ἁ]γησίας	Kallias	[A]gesias
4. Πολεμοκράτης	9. καὶ ἂν τις	Polemokrates	and if someone else on behalf of him [...]
	10. ἄλλος ὑ πὲρ ἐ-		and if someone else on behalf of him [...]
	11. κείνου		and if someone else on behalf of him [...]

The tablet seems to include no cursing verb, but instead a more general (now incomplete) phrase at the end; a common format of a 4th-century BC curse tablet, as it is evident in other examples from Attica, Lesbos, and Locris. The last phrase mentions the allies of a man (ἐκείνου), most likely of Euippas, whose name is placed first and appears to be distinguished from the rest. The peculiar lettering ΑΛΛΟΣ^{Υ}ΠΕΡΕ indicates that the writer initially went for πὲρ ἐκείνου (reflecting the local form, influenced by Thessalian), which was later corrected to ὑπὲρ ἐκείνου 'on behalf of him', reflecting the koine form instead. The growing influence of koine is also visible in conditional ἂν (i.e. ἐάν).

Pydna tablet V
Greek	Translation
1. Παυσανίας, Ἱππίας, Λυγκωρίτα[ς]	Pausanias, Hippias, Lynkoritas
2. Σιμμίας, Τρόχας, Κρατεύας, Αἲολος	Simmias, Trochas, Krateuas, Aiolos
3. Γε μας, Ἀμηρύγκας, Ορωιδυος	Ge mas, Amerynkas, Oroidyos
4. Λιμναῖος, Θεόπροπος, Ἀρρύβας	Limnaios. Theopropos, Arrybas
5. Φίλιππος, Μένυλλος, Ἂσανδρος	Philippos, Menyllos, Asandros
6. Φιλώνιχος, Κτολέμμα[ς], Λόκρος	Philonichos, Ktolemmas, Lokros
7. Ἂλκιμος, Ἀμύντας, καὶ ὃστις Σιμμίαι	Alkimos, Amyntas, and whoever is with Simmias and (with) Trochas, and Krateuas, and Pausanias as co-litigant I write down the tongues of all of these men
8. καὶ Τρόχαι [συν] καὶ Κρατεύαι καὶ Παυσανίαι σύνδικο[ς]	Alkimos, Amyntas, and whoever is with Simmias and (with) Trochas, and Krateuas, and Pausanias as co-litigant I write down the tongues of all of these men
9. καταγράφω τὰς γ[λ]ώσσας ἐκείνων πάντων ἀνδρῶ[ν]	Alkimos, Amyntas, and whoever is with Simmias and (with) Trochas, and Krateuas, and Pausanias as co-litigant I write down the tongues of all of these men

The language of the tablet, namely the words σύνδικος ('co-litigant') and γλώσσας ('tongues'), clearly indicate the judicial nature of the curse, which was particularly composed in order to influence a lawsuit by silencing the allies of Simmias, Trochas, Krateuas, and Pausanias. Most of the names that are mentioned here are known in the region and are typically ancient Macedonian (e.g. Amyntas, Krateuas, Philippos etc.). The missing of the final -s in Lynkorita[s] and Ktolemma[s] is a phenomenon familiar with Northwest Greek, while the frequent appearance of the -as ending in the tablet is an indication of its Aeolic–Doric character. The name Ktolemmas is a variation of Ptolemmas (Πτολέμμας), a familiar name in ancient Macedon (cf. Ptolemy), displaying the documented shift between pt > kt. As such, the text can be overall characterized as Macedonian, in terms of onomastics and linguistic features. The verb καταγράφω and the following expressions used against rival litigants, also occurring in a curse tablet from Arethousa, may also be an indication of the fast-growing influence of a ritual koine in the northern Aegean.

Pydna tablet VI
Greek		Translation
1. Καταδεσσμεύω τὰς γλώσσας	7. καί εἴ τις ἄλλοις	I bind down the tongues	and if some other enemy rages with madness
2. Χωροτίμο	8. τι μαίνεται	of Chorotimos,	and if some other enemy rages with madness
3. Διονυσίο, Αμδώκο	9. ἐχθρός	Dionysios, Am[a]dokos,	and if some other enemy rages with madness
4. Ἀρισστίωνος	10. [μ]ὴ δυνάσσθω ἀν-	Aristion,	let him not be able to speak out against me, nor [...]
5. Πρωτοχάρεος	11. [τ]ιλέγε[ι]ν μήδ[ε --]	Protochares,	let him not be able to speak out against me, nor [...]
6. Ἀμυντίχο		Amyntichos,

The purpose of this tablet, as is evident by its unique structure and language, was to influence a lawsuit, by targeting the tongues of the litigants and preventing the ability of a potential enemy to "speak against" the writer (ἀντιλέγειν). The main verb καταδεσμεύω also occurs in other 4th century curse tablets from Attica and Euboea, and is again accompanied by the word ἐχθρός 'enemy'. On the other hand, this is the first instance where the verb μαίνεται 'rages with madness' is attested in a curse tablet. The tablet exhibits the characteristic local duplication of sigma, such as in the name Aris(s)tion (Ἀρισστίων) and the verbs καταδεσσμεύω and δυνάσσθω 'to be able'. The koine (or Ionic) εἴ conditional is also present.

== See also ==
- Akanthos curse tablet
- Phiale of Megara
