= Akanthos curse tablet =

Ancient Greek text

- Material: Lead
- Created: 4th century BC
- Discovered: Akanthos, Central Macedonia, Greece
- Present location: Archaeological Museum of Thessaloniki
- Language: Ancient Greek

The Akanthos curse tablet is a double-sided text written in Ancient Greek that was discovered at the necropolis of Akanthos, a city in Macedonia located on the north-east of the Chalcidice peninsula. It was made public in 1993, along with three more tablets from Akanthos, at the 14th conference held by the Linguistics Department of the Aristotle University of Thessaloniki. The tablet has been dated to the late 4th century BC, when Akanthos was part of the Macedonian kingdom. It contains a magic spell (Ancient Greek: κατάδεσμος, katadesmos) which belongs to the category of erotic or amatory curses. The text was composed by a man named Pausanias and was intended to bind down two individuals, Sime and Ainis, of whom the former is identified for certain as a love interest. The Akanthos tablet is an example of a love spell that is unambiguously written from the male perspective, and one of the earliest surviving examples of an 'attraction curse', a spell that expresses its intention to bring its target to the agent.

== Interpretation ==
The Akanthos curse tablet belongs to the broad category of erotic or amatory curses, which were intended to influence erotic relationships. Scholars further divide this category between 'separation curses', which include the more well-known tablet from Pella, and 'attraction curses', of which the Akanthos tablet is among the earliest known examples. This type of attraction spells would later be known as agoge (αγωγή) or agogimon (αγώγιμον), and were very commonly issued by a male agent with the intention to attract a desired woman. Although the tradition of attraction rituals is documented at an earlier period from literary sources (e.g. Jason and Medea), the late 4th century BC Akanthos tablet was until recently the earliest surviving example of this type; two more recently published Greek spells from Sicily that seem to display features of an attraction curse have been dated to the 5th century BC. Curse-writing rituals were performed in the Macedonian capital well before the time of Philip II, and continued to flourish in cities like Pella and Pydna during the time of Macedon's expansion and urbanization. By the mid-4th century BC, neighbouring settlements that had now passed under Macedonian control would yield a handful of curse tablets of their own, including the cities of Arethousa, Oraiokastro, and Akanthos. Pausanias' tablet is one of the five curse tablets discovered in Akanthos from when the city was part of Macedon proper. Following the standard practice of Greek magicians, the tablets were buried at necropolises, in hopes that the spell would be successfully carried to the underworld by the soul of a recently deceased human.

On each side of the tablet, Pausanias expresses his wish to bind down two separate people, Sime (Σίμη) and Ainis (Αἶνις). The name Ainis is generally non-gender-specific; its bearer is sometimes also identified as female, or sometimes not classified at all. The tablet includes the names of both the agent and the targets, which is generally a rare incidence for traditional katadesmoi. Similar to the composer of the Pella tablet, Pausanias wishes to be the only one to have control over the time span of the spell's efficacy, and thus be the only one able to release the binding. The tablet is particularly notable, as the two conditions included in the curse were never before seen together, nor separately in a curse tablet of such an early date. One condition is that the first target (Sime) shall not be able to enjoy the benefits of Aphrodite ("nor may Aphrodite be gracious for her"), a theme found mainly in aggressive erotic spells of the Imperial period. The other condition is that both targets may not be able to fulfill their ritual obligations. In particular, Pausanias writes that the targets shall not be able to perform sacrifices ("touch a sacrificial victim"), until they give in to his demands (Athena is specifically mentioned as the recipient of Sime's sacrifice on side-A of the tablet). This wish implies that their abstinence from ritual sacrifices would be seen as offensive to the gods, and could therefore turn divine wrath against them. The idea that the targets of a curse risk divine offense if the agent's demands are not satisfied is a familiar theme in curse-writing that is found throughout Asia Minor and the Mediterranean world, including in 4th century BC Greek curses from the northern Black Sea. The spell seems to have been sexually motivated, as evident by Pausanias' last wish, which is for Sime to 'embrace' or 'cling to' him (ἐνσχῇ). There have been various theories regarding the identity and social status of Sime, including that she may have been a sex-worker, a married woman, or a pallake, though ultimately none of them can be securely confirmed.

== Texts and translation ==
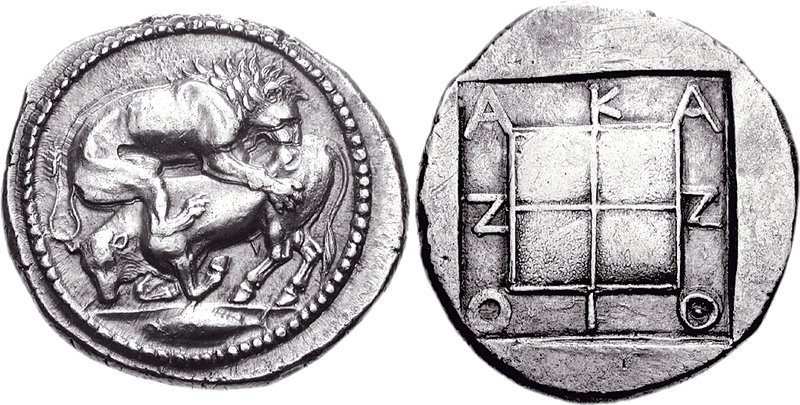
Tetradrachm from Akanthos depicting a lion attacking a bull and an inscription that reads ΑΚΑΝΘΙΟΝ, '[coin] of Akanthos'.

=== Side A ===
==== Greek ====
1. Παυσανίας Σίμην τὴν Ἀν-

2. φιτρίτου καταδεῖ, μέχρι ἂν Παυ-

3. σανίαι ποιήσῃ ὃσα Παυσανίας βούλεται

4. Και μήτι ἱερίου Ἀθηναίας ἃψασθαι

5. δύναιτο, μήτηι Ἀφροδίτη ἱλέως αὐτῇ

6. εἲη, πρὶν ἂν Παυσανίαν ἐνσχῇ Σίμη

7. Ταῦτα δεὶ μηδείς ἀναλύσαι ἀλλ' ἤ Παυσανίας

==== English ====
Pausanias binds down Sime, the daughter of Amphitritos, until she does for Pausanias whatever Pausanias wants. And may she not be able to touch a victim sacrificed to Athena, nor may Aphrodite be propitious to her, before Sime clings to Pausanias. And let no other than Pausanias undo these things.

=== Side B ===
==== Greek ====
1. [...] Μελίσσης Ἀπολλωνίδος

2. Παυσανίας καταδεῖ Αἶνιν. Μήτι ἱερ-

3. είου ἃψασθαι δύναιτο μήται ἂλλου ἀγα-

4. θοῦ ἐπήβολος δύναιτο γεναίσθαι, πιρὶν-

5. ἂν Παυσανίαν ἱλάσηται Αἶνις.

6. Ταῦτα δεὶ μηδείς ἀναλύσαι ἀλλ' ἤ Παυσανίας

==== English ====
... of Melissa of Apollonia.
Pausanias binds down Ainis. Let her not be able to touch a sacrificial victim nor be able to the recipient of any other good, until Ainis is propitious to Pausanias. And let no one other than Pausanias undo these things.

== See also ==
- Phiale of Megara
- Pydna curse tablets

== Sources ==
- Christesen, Paul; Murray, Sarah (2010). "Macedonian Religion". In Roisman, Joseph; Worthington, Ian (eds.). A Companion to Ancient Macedonia. Malden, MA: John Wiley and Sons. ISBN 978-1-4051-7936-2.
- Eidinow, Esther (2007). Oracles, Curses, and Risk Among the Ancient Greeks. Oxford University Press. ISBN 9780191557224.
- Kopidakis, Michael Z. (2008). "Μέλισσα Απολλωνίδος" [Melissa of Apollonia]. ΤΟ ΒΗΜΑ (in Greek).
- Lamont, Jessica (2023). In Blood and Ashes, Curse Tablets and Binding Spells in Ancient Greece. Oxford University Press. ISBN 9780197517789.
- Yates Scott, Teresa (2017). Marital Ruptures and Ritual Space in Classical Greece (Thesis). University of California, Irvine.
