= Pella curse tablet =

Doric Greek artifact

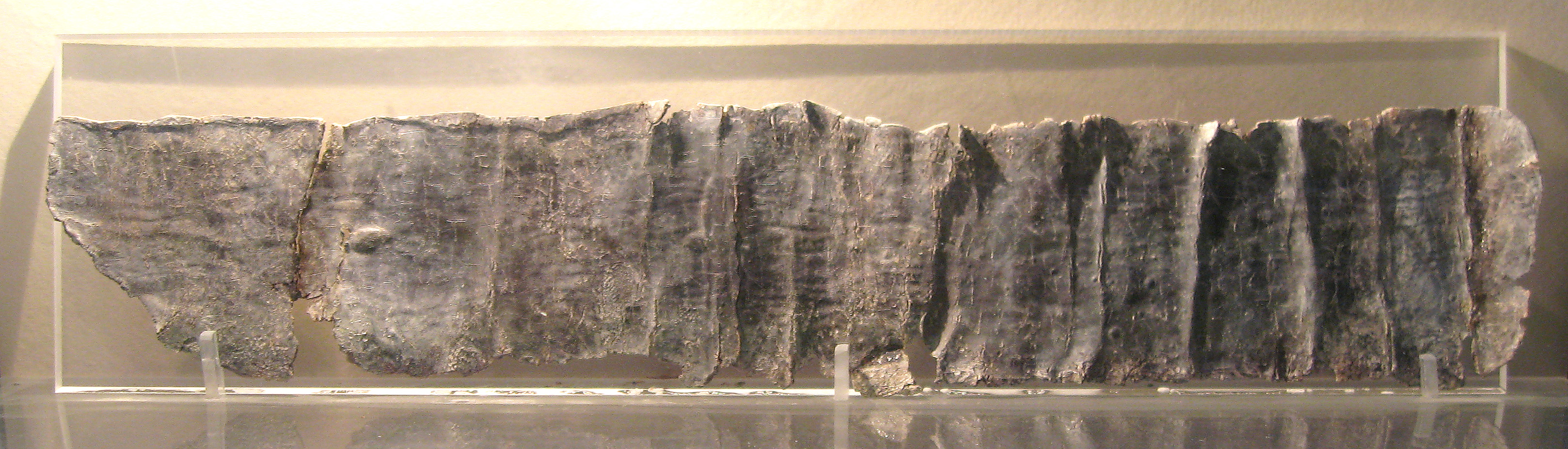
- The Pella curse tablet
- Material: Lead
- Created: c. 380–350 BC
- Discovered: 1986; Pella, Central Macedonia, Greece
- Present location: Archaeological Museum of Pella
- Language: Ancient Greek

The Pella curse tablet is a text written in a distinct Doric Greek idiom, found in Pella, the ancient capital of Macedon, in 1986. Ιt contains a curse or magic spell (Ancient Greek: κατάδεσμος, katadesmos) inscribed on a lead scroll, dated to the first half of the 4th century BC (c. 380–350 BC). It was published in the Hellenic Dialectology Journal in 1993 and is currently held in the Archaeological Museum of Pella. The Pella curse tablet exhibits some of the typical Northwest Greek features, as well as a cluster of unique Doric features that do not appear in other subdialects of this family (e.g. Epirote, Locrian). It represents the same or a very similar vernacular dialect that is also attested in the other Doric inscriptions from Macedonia. This indicates that a Doric Greek dialect was not imported, but proper to Macedon. As a result, the Pella curse tablet has been forwarded as an argument that Ancient Macedonian was a variety of Northwest Greek, and one of the Doric dialects.

The spell was written by a woman, possibly named Dagina or Phila. It was intended to prevent the marriage of her love interest, Dionysophon, with Thetima, and secure that Dionysophon would marry and live a happy life with her instead. The spell was entrusted to the corpse of a deceased man, named Macron.

== Interpretation ==
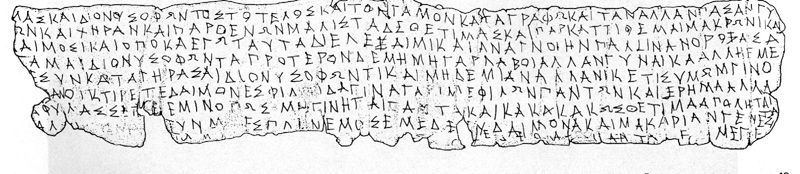
The Pella katadesmos

The Pella curse tablet includes a magic spell or love charm written by a woman, perhaps named Dagina (Ancient Greek: Δαγίνα) or Phila (Φίλα), whose love interest, Dionysophōn (Διονυσοφῶν) (Note: The name is attested in the genitive: Διονυσοφῶντος, as well as the dative, and the accusative case.) sometimes thought to be a former lover, is apparently about to marry Thetima (Θετίμα). (Note: The name 'Thetima' is a Doric variation of the Attic Greek: Θεοτίμη Theotimē 'she who honors the gods'.) As such, she invokes "Makron and the daimones" (Note: She writes in Doric: παρκαττίθεμαι (parkattithemai) μάκρωνι καὶ [τοῖς] δαίμοσι. In Attic, παρκαττίθεμαι would be written παρακατατίθεμαι (parakatatithemai) instead.) to cause Dionysophon to marry her instead. The text opens with the verb καταγράφω 'I register' followed by the objects of the curse, which seem to be the fulfillment (telos) and marriage (gamos) of the couple. The former may refer to any type of consummation, like that of a marriage, while the latter can refer to marriage as a ritual, as well as the couple's sexual union. Arius Didymus mentions that the Dorians referred to marriage as telos, a detail that might explain this somewhat unusual choice of words by the writer. Dagina writes that no woman should marry Dionysophon, unless she herself recovers and unrolls the scroll. The language of the spell suggests that the writer perceived herself as having been wronged, perhaps by Thetima, who appears to be forcefully cursed, while no curse throughout the text is explicitly directed to Dionysophon. The writer's wish to have her rival 'destroyed' and for herself to be 'happy and blessed' is a typical motif that is commonly found in curse tablets. On the other hand, her wish to grow old by Dionysophon's side (συνκαταγηρᾶσαι) appears to be a particular sign of tenderness that has no other parallel in epigraphic tradition. The tablet is described as a "mixed curse" due to the supplicative nature of the appeal. The word ΕΡΗΜΑ (Note: The adjective ἐρήμα erēma is a variation of ἐρήμη erēmē and Attic ἔρημος erēmos lit. 'lonely, desolate') "abandoned" referring to herself is quite common in appeals to divine powers, while the word ΙΚΕΤΙΣ 'suppliant' is expressly used when speaking to the daimones. The spell was intrusted to the body of a deceased man, named Macron (Μάκρων), reflecting the practice of Greek magicians to place their spells at the sanctuary of a deity or along a recently buried body, securing that the spell would be successfully carried to the underworld.

Magic practices in ancient Macedon are of particular interest, as they shed light on popular religious beliefs and not exclusively on the practices of the Macedonian elites. Though previously ignored as being of minor significance, magic has been proven to be widely practiced throughout the ancient Greek world in conjunction with official religious beliefs. That said, magic remained a marginal practice, largely performed in secret, and associated with the underworld and the daimones (lesser guiding spirits, navigating between the gods and the humans). It was not uncommon for professional sorcerers to provide their guidance for payment, helping individuals with the composition of their curse, which may have also been the case for the Pella tablet. Though not unlikely, it is noted that the text appears to be particularly personal, making it possible for it to have been composed by the woman herself. Whatever the case, the text seems to reflect the woman's local dialect, while the curse itself follows the traditional structure, as it was used throughout the Greek world. Katadesmoi or defixiones were spells written on non-perishable material, such as lead, stone or baked clay, and were secretly buried to ensure their physical integrity, which would then guarantee the permanence of their intended effects. The language of the Pella curse tablet is a distinct form of North-West Greek, and the low social status of its writer, as (arguably) evidenced by her vocabulary and belief in magic, strongly suggests that a unique form of West Greek was spoken by lower-class people in Pella at the time the tablet was written. This should not, however, be taken to indicate that only those of middling or low social status practiced magic in the Ancient Greek world; quite wealthy individuals would also use lead katadesmoi (curse tablets) for love, revenge, and to bind their opponents in athletic contests.

== Text and translation ==
=== Greek ===
1. [ΘΕΤΙ]ΜΑΣ ΚΑΙ ΔΙΟΝΥΣΟΦΩΝΤΟΣ ΤΟ ΤΕΛΟΣ ΚΑΙ ΤΟΝ ΓΑΜΟΝ ΚΑΤΑΓΡΑΦΩ ΚΑΙ ΤΑΝ ΑΛΛΑΝ ΠΑΣΑΝ ΓΥ-
2. [ΝΑΙΚ]ΩΝ ΚΑΙ ΧΗΡΑΝ ΚΑΙ ΠΑΡΘΕΝΩΝ ΜΑΛΙΣΤΑ ΔΕ ΘΕΤΙΜΑΣ ΚΑΙ ΠΑΡΚΑΤΤΙΘΕΜΑΙ ΜΑΚΡΩΝΙ^{1} ΚΑΙ
3. [ΤΟΙΣ] ΔΑΙΜΟΣΙ ΚΑΙ ΟΠΟΚΑ ΕΓΩ ΤΑΥΤΑ ΔΙΕΛΕΞΑΙΜΙ ΚΑΙ ΑΝΑΓΝΟΙΗΝ ΠΑΛΕΙΝ ΑΝΟΡΟΞΑΣΑ
4. [ΤΟΚΑ] ΓΑΜΑΙ ΔΙΟΝΥΣΟΦΩΝΤΑ ΠΡΟΤΕΡΟΝ ΔΕ ΜΗ ΜΗ ΓΑΡ ΛΑΒΟΙ ΑΛΛΑΝ ΓΥΝΑΙΚΑ ΑΛΛ᾽ Η ΕΜΕ
5. [ΕΜΕ Δ]Ε ΣΥΝΚΑΤΑΓΗΡΑΣΑΙ ΔΙΟΝΥΣΟΦΩΝΤΙ ΚΑΙ ΜΗΔΕΜΙΑΝ ΑΛΛΑΝ ΙΚΕΤΙΣ ΥΜΩΜ ΓΙΝΟ-
6. [ΜΑΙ ΦΙΛ]ΑΝ^{2} ΟΙΚΤΙΡΕΤΕ ΔΑΙΜΟΝΕΣ ΦΙΛ[ΟΙ] ΔΑΓΙΝΑ^{3} ΓΑΡΙΜΕ ΦΙΛΩΝ ΠΑΝΤΩΝ ΚΑΙ ΕΡΗΜΑ ΑΛΛΑ
7. [ΤΑΥΤ]Α ΦΥΛΑΣΣΕΤΕ ΕΜΙΝ ΟΠΩΣ ΜΗ ΓΙΝΗΤΑΙ ΤΑ[Υ]ΤΑ ΚΑΙ ΚΑΚΑ ΚΑΚΩΣ ΘΕΤΙΜΑ ΑΠΟΛΗΤΑΙ
8. [....]ΑΛ[-].ΥΝΜ .. ΕΣΠΛΗΝ ΕΜΟΣ ΕΜΕ Δ᾽ ΕΥ[Δ]ΑΙΜΟΝΑ ΚΑΙ ΜΑΚΑΡΙΑΝ ΓΕΝΕΣΤΑΙ
9. [-]ΤΟ[.].[-].[..]..Ε.Ε.Ω[?]Α.[.]Ε..ΜΕΓΕ [-]

=== English ===
Of Thetima and Dionysophon the ritual wedding and the marriage I bind by a written spell, as well as (the marriage) of all other women (to him), both widows and maidens, but above all of Thetima; and I entrust this spell to Macron and to the daimones. And were I ever to unfold and read these words again after digging (the tablet) up, only then should Dionysophon marry, not before; may he indeed not take another woman than myself, but let me alone grow old by the side of Dionysophon and no one else. I implore you: have pity for [Phila?], dear daimones, [for I am bereft] of all my dear ones and abandoned. But please keep this (piece of writing) for my sake so that these events do not happen and wretched Thetima perishes miserably [...] but let me become happy and blessed.

— Christesen & Murray 2010, p. 435, based on Voutiras 1998.

==== Points of interpretation ====
1. "Makron" (line 2) is most probably the name of the dead man in whose grave the tablet was deposited. This was commonly done in the belief that the deceased would "convey" the message to the Chthonic spirits of the Greek underworld (the "daimones" in lines 3 and 6).
2. The missing word in line 6 between "I am your supplicant" and "have pity" (here reconstructed as [Phil?]a) is carved at the edge of the tablet and the only things we can read of it are that it is a short word that ends in-AN. "PHILAN" is a likely reconstruction, but by no means the only one possible. If true, the word "PHILAN" could equally well be either the personal name "Phila", a familiar ancient Macedonian name, or the feminine adjective "phila", "friend" or "dear one". In the latter case, an alternative reading of line 6 would be: "Have pity on your dear one, dear daimones". In the former case, a personal name would be perfectly placed but, as the name of the person who wrote the curse is not mentioned elsewhere, it is impossible to know with certainty what the missing word is.
3. The word "DAGINA" (line 6) is inexplicable and previously unattested, even as a personal name. Dubois (1995) has suggested that the initial delta is a voiced tau, while the gamma should be seen as a misspelling of pi; as such, the writer may have intended to write "dapina" (the difference between Γ and Π being a single stroke). If true, this may mean that dapina is an (also unattested) Macedonian rendering of what would be written tapeina, and in standard Attic tapeinē (ταπεινή 'humble, lowly, brought low'). In this case the inscription reads: "for I am lowly from all my dear ones and abandoned" etc. Another possibility is that Dagina is perhaps related to δαγύς, a doll or puppet, especially as used in magic (cf. LSJ p. 364). Similarly, ΙΜΕ is also unexplained, but seems to be taken as a misspelling of ΕΜΙ (εμι); i.e. Attic εἰμί 'I am'.

== Dating and language ==
The Pella curse tablet is dated to the first half of the 4th century BC. Jordan (2000) says the tablet has been dated to the "Mid-IV [century] or slightly earlier"; Engels (2010) writes that it is dated from mid- to early 4th century BC. In particular, the tablet is most commonly dated between 380 and 350 BC, such as by Hall (2014), Brixhe (2018), Foxhall (2020), Van Beek (2022), and Lamont (2023).

The text is written in a distinct Doric Greek idiom. It shares the typical features that appear in other Northwest Greek dialects, such as Epirote or Locrian Greek, a portion of which is also shared with Thessalian. It also displays a number of distinct Doric features that do not coincide with other Doric or Northwest varieties. Among the typical Northwest features of the curse tablet are the apocope in the proverbs κατ- and παρ-, the dative pronoun εμίν for εμοί, the temporal adverbs in -κα (τόκα, ὁπόκα, which cannot be Thessalian, i.e. Aeolic), the genitive pronoun ὑμῶμ for ὑμῶν, contraction of a: + o: to a: (πασᾶν for πασῶν), and an indication of spirantization of aspirates (γενέσται for γενέσθαι); the last two and the apocope also being features of Thessalian. The variety displays instances of alternative spellings between <Ε, Ι, ΕΙ> and <Ο, Υ>, such as in words διελέξαιμι for διελίξαιμι, ἰμέ for εἰμί, πάλειν for πάλιν, and ἀνορόξασα for ἀνορύξασα. Among these examples may be the word ΔΑΠΙΝΑ (δαπινά), a potential alternative spelling of ταπεινά, which displays the occasional phenomenon of voicing the unvoiced consonants; also shared with Thessalian.

Additional features, like the dative case in δαίμοσι and the assimilation of /g/ in γίνο[μαι, may be an indication of some Attic-Ionic influence on this Doric variety. Based on the dating of the tablet, a degree of Attic influence can be seen as plausible, as by the 4th century BC a common koine dialect based on Attic began to be favored over local dialects, including in the territory of Macedon. Nevertheless, Attic influence on the text remains limited, visible mostly in syntax, and much less in morphology and phonetics. Regardless of potential influences, the features attested in this variety remain unique within the Doric family, as they are not documented anywhere else, indicating that a Doric dialect was not imported, but proper to Macedon.

== Significance ==
The discovery of the Pella curse tablet, according to Olivier Masson, substantiates the view that the ancient Macedonian language was a form of North-West Greek:

Yet in contrast with earlier views which made of it [i.e. Macedonian] an Aeolic dialect (O. Hoffmann compared Thessalian) we must by now think of a link with North-West Greek (Locrian, Aetolian, Phocidian, Epirote). This view is supported by the recent discovery at Pella of a curse tablet (4th cent. BC), which may well be the first 'Macedonian' text attested [...] the text includes an adverb "opoka" which is not Thessalian.

Of the same opinion is James L. O'Neil's (University of Sydney) presentation at the 2005 Conference of the Australasian Society for Classical Studies, entitled "Doric Forms in Macedonian Inscriptions" (abstract):

A fourth‐century BC curse tablet from Pella shows word forms which are clearly Doric, but a different form of Doric from any of the west Greek dialects of areas adjoining Macedon. Three other, very brief, fourth century inscriptions are also indubitably Doric. These show that a Doric dialect was spoken in Macedon, as we would expect from the West Greek forms of Greek names found in Macedon. And yet later Macedonian inscriptions are in Koine avoiding both Doric forms and the Macedonian voicing of consonants. The native Macedonian dialect had become unsuitable for written documents.

Professor Johannes Engels of the University of Cologne argues that the Pella curse tablet provides evidence to support that Macedonian was a North-West Greek dialect:

Another very important testimony comes from the so-called Pella curse tablet. This is a text written in Doric Greek and found in 1986 [...] This has been judged to be the most important ancient testimony to substantiate that Macedonian was a north-western Greek and mainly a Doric dialect.

Lamont (2023) notes that the discovery of the tablet supports the view that the Macedonian language was a variety of Northwest Doric. Besides that, the tablet provides significant cultural insight, as it suggests that the Macedonians were familiar with Greek social and ritual practices well before Philip II conquered the southern Greek mainland and exposed his kingdom to wider Greek influence.

== See also ==
- Curse tablet
- Mandaic lead rolls
- Phiale of Megara
- Pydna curse tablets

== Sources ==
- Bloomer, Martin (2005). The Contest of Language: Before and Beyond Nationalism. Notre Dame, Indiana: University of Notre Dame Press. ISBN 0-268-02190-2.
- Brixhe, Claude (2018). "Macedonian". In Joseph, Brian; Klein, Jared; Wenthe, Mark; Fritz, Matthias (eds.). Handbook of Comparative and Historical Indo-European Linguistics. Vol. 3. De Gruyter. ISBN 9783110542431.
- Crespo, Emilio (2023). "Dialects in Contact in the Ancient Kingdom of Macedon". In Cassio, Albio Cesare; Kaczko, Sara (eds.). Alloglōssoi: Multilingualism and Minority Languages in Ancient Europe. De Gruyter. ISBN 978-3-11-077968-4.
- Christesen, Paul; Murray, Sarah (2010). "Macedonian Religion". In Roisman, Joseph; Worthington, Ian (eds.). A Companion to Ancient Macedonia. Malden, MA: John Wiley and Sons. ISBN 978-1-4051-7936-2.
- Curbera, Jaime; Jordan, David (2002–2003). "Curse Tablets from Pydna". Greek, Roman, and Byzantine Studies. 43 (2). Duke University: 109–128. ISSN 0017-3916.
- Damon, Cynthia; Miller, John F.; Myers, K. Sara; Courtney, Edward (2002). Vertis in Usum: Studies in Honor of Edward Courtney. München and Leipzig, Germany: Walter de Gruyter. ISBN 3-598-77710-8.
- Dubois, Laurent (1995). "Une Tablette de Malediction de Pella: S'Agit-il du Premier Texte Macédonien". Revue des Études Grecques. 108: 190–197. doi:10.3406/reg.1995.2649.
- Engels, Johannes (2010). "Macedonians and Greeks". In Roisman, Joseph; Worthington, Ian (eds.). A Companion to Ancient Macedonia. Malden, MA: John Wiley and Sons. ISBN 978-1-4051-7936-2.
- Fantuzzi, Marco; Hunter, Richard L. (2004). Tradition and Innovation in Hellenistic Poetry. Cambridge, United Kingdom: Cambridge University Press. ISBN 0-521-83511-9.
- Fortson, Benjamin W. (2010). Indo-European Language and Culture: An Introduction (Second ed.). West Sussex, United Kingdom: John Wiley and Sons Limited. ISBN 978-1-4051-8896-8.
- Foxhall, Lin (2020). "In Private: The Individual and the Domestic Community". In Cairns, Douglas (ed.). A Cultural History of the Emotions in Antiquity. Bloomsbury Publishing. ISBN 9781350091641.
- Hammond, Nicholas G.L. (1993) [1989]. The Macedonian State: Origins, Institutions and History (Reprint ed.). Oxford: Oxford University Press. ISBN 0-19-814927-1.
- Hall, Edith (2014). Introducing the Ancient Greeks, From Bronze Age Seafarers to Navigators of the Western Mind. W. W. Norton. ISBN 9781448161621.
- Hornblower, Simon (2002). "Macedon, Thessaly and Boiotia". The Greek World, 479–323 BC (Third ed.). Routledge. ISBN 0415163269.
- Jordan, D. R. (2000). "New Greek Curse Tablets (1985–2000)". Greek, Roman, and Byzantine Studies. 41. Duke University: 5–46. Archived from the original on 2019-01-30.
- Lamont, Jessica (2023). In Blood and Ashes, Curse Tablets and Binding Spells in Ancient Greece. Oxford University Press. ISBN 9780197517789.
- Masson, Olivier; Dubois, Laurent (2000). Onomastica Graeca Selecta. Geneva, Switzerland: Librairie Droz. ISBN 2-600-00435-1.
- Masson, Olivier (2003) [1996]. "Macedonian Language". In Hornblower, Simon; Spawforth, Antony (eds.). The Oxford Classical Dictionary (Revised 3rd ed.). Oxford: Oxford University Press. pp. 905–906. ISBN 0-19-860641-9.
- Masson, Olivier (2014). "Macedonian language". In Spawforth, Antony; Eidinow, Esther; Hornblower, Simon (eds.). The Oxford Companion to Classical Civilization (2nd ed.). Oxford University Press. ISBN 9780191016769.
- Meier-Brügger, Michael (2003). Indo-European Linguistics. Berlin: Walter de Gruyter. ISBN 978-3-11-017433-5.
- Méndez-Dosuna, Julián (2012). "Ancient Macedonian as a Greek dialect: A critical survey on recent work (Greek, English, French, German text)". In Giannakis, Georgios K. (ed.). Ancient Macedonia: Language, History, Culture. Centre for Greek language. ISBN 978-960-7779-52-6.
- O'Neil, James L. (2006). "Doric Forms in Macedonian Inscriptions". Glotta. 82. Göttingen, Germany: Vandenhoeck und Ruprecht: 192–210.
- Van Beek, Lucien (2022). "Greek". In Olander, Thomas (ed.). The Indo-European Language Family. Cambridge University Press. ISBN 9781108499798.
- Voutiras, Emmanuel (1998). Dionysophōntos Gamoi: Marital Life and Magic in Fourth Century Pella. Amsterdam, the Netherlands: J.C. Gieben. ISBN 90-5063-407-9.
- Voutiras, Emmanouel (1993). "A dialectal curse tablet from Pella" [Ένας διαλεκτικός κατάδεσμος από την Πέλλα]. In Katsanis, Nikolaos (ed.). Hellenic Dialectology (in Greek). Vol. 3. Thessaloniki: Αφοί Κυριακίδη. pp. 43–48. ISBN 960-343-226-1.
