= Epirote Greek =

Variety of Northwest Doric Greek

Epirote
- Ancient Greek dialects per Woodard (2008), with Epirotic included in the chestnut brown area north of the Ambracian Gulf.
- Region: Epirus
- Ethnicity: Ancient Epirotes
- Era: c. 1st millennium BCE – 2nd century CE
- Language family: Indo-European: Hellenic; Greek; (disputed); Doric; Northwest; Epirote
- Early form: Proto-Greek
- Writing system: Greek alphabet

Language codes
- ISO 639-3: –

The Epirote dialect is a variety of Northwest Doric that was spoken in the ancient Greek state of Epirus during the Classical Era. It outlived most other Greek dialects that were replaced by the Attic-based Koine, surviving until the first or second century CE, in part due to the existence of a separate Northwest Doric koine.

== Classification ==
The Greek population of Epirus proper (not including colonies founded on or near the coast by southern Greeks) spoke a dialectal variety of Northwest Doric, joining Epirotic with Locrian, Phocian, Delphic, Aenanian, Aetolian, Acarnian, and possibly Ancient Macedonian. Doric, including Northwest Doric and its sister branches, may also be called "West Greek" or "North Greek".

Nevertheless, Epirote lacked some of the features that are described as salient diagnostics of Northwest Doric, including the athematic dative plural -ois, the third person imperative -nton, and the mediopassive participle forms in -ei-. Likewise, the uncontracted Doric -eo- sequence is barely attested in Epirus, because it was usually sidelined by the contraction of -ou--, though it does appear in anthroponyms in Epirus.

Méndez Dosuna argued for a distinction of four subgroups within Northwest Doric, in which Epirote, Eastern Locrian, Epizephyrian Locrian and Acarnian were "Medial Northwest" (on the other hand, the "most Northwest" were Delphic, Aetolian, Elean, and West Locrian). Dosuna argues that North-West Greece was an area of dialectal convergence that became increasingly homogenous from the fifth century BCE onwards, coinciding with the rise of different koinai and political integration.

== History of study ==
Epirote is considered to be under-investigated. Speaking in a broad sense of the history of Epirus, as of 2018, a number of advances have been made in the last few decades, largely powered by ongoing progress in archaeological research in both Greece and Southern Albania. However, there is no up-to-date comprehensive work incorporating all the recent archaeological advances, meaning the least outdated summary is Hammond 1967. Likewise, despite newly available epigraphic corpora from Dodona and Bouthroton (modern Butrint), Greek linguist Filos notes that there remains no holistic linguistic account of Epirus at all that extends beyond a "non-piecemeal description of the epichoric variety", though Filos himself offers a summarized account.

In 2013, a collection of over 4000 texts from the Dodona lamellae was published.

== History ==
=== Attestation ===
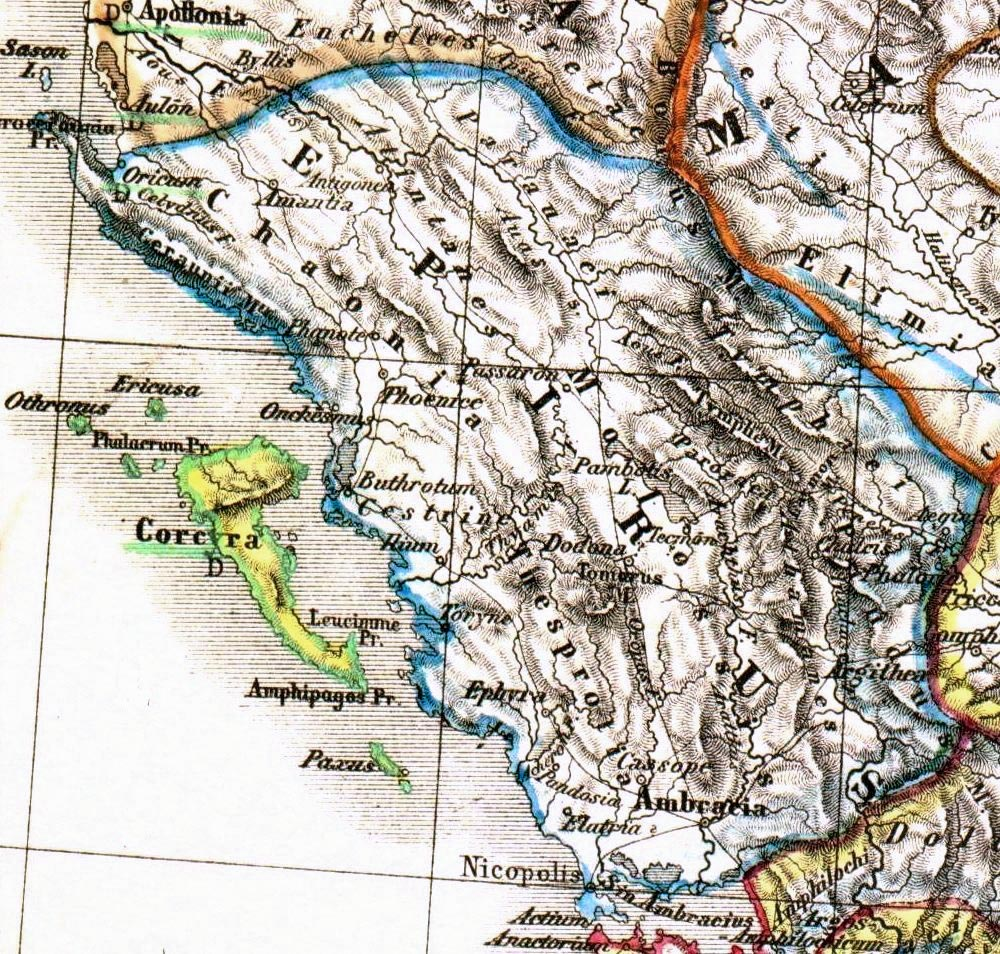
Ancient Epirus as per Kleipert 1902

Evidence from epigraphy starting in the late Archaic period (sixth to fifth centuries BCE) as well as ancient literary evidence indicates that the people of Epirus spoke a dialectal variety of Northwest Doric. On the other hand, southern Greek dialects were spoken by some of the coastal colonies established by southern Greeks, while in the north, there was a language border with Illyrian. There is earlier attestation of texts from the southern Greek colonies on the coast, but these spoke different varieties of Greek (Corinthian in Ambracia, Elean in Pandosia, etc.). The variety manifested in the early texts of Dodona is also not representative of Epirotic Greek.

Except for the unrepresentative oracular tablets at Dodona, Epirus was among a set of Greek regions that practically lacked documentation until the Classical period, this set also including Macedonia, Pamphylia, and Aetolia. In terms of early written records, Epirus and the rest of north-west Greece also lagged behind other Northwest-Doric speaking areas, with areas such as Delphi and West Locris providing earlier sources.

The (numerous) Northwest Doric oracular tablets from Dodona (the latter of which are indeed Epirotic) are typically short texts written on small lead plates, whose small size caused the text to be written in an elliptic style.

=== Influences ===
A number of scholars have asserted a possible partial Hellenization of pre-classical Epirus, wherein Greek elites would have engendered a language shift by elite dominance over an originally non-Greek-speaking population, including Nilsson (1909), Crossland (1982), and Kokoszko & Witczak (2009) However, such views largely relied on subjective ancient testimonies and are not supported by the earliest evidence (epigraphic, etc.). On the other side, Hammond (1982) argued the converse, wherein it was southward and eastward Illyrian expansions that intruded upon an originally Greek Epirus. Filos (2017) notes that due to the limitations of our linguistic knowledge of Epirus during the relevant period, which is entirely lacking except for the onomastic evidence of anthronyms, tribe names, and toponyms, any assumptions either way about which element (Illyrian, Greek) was intrusive is "tantamount to plain guesswork", but one may reasonably assume a degree of bidialectalism along its coastline (cf. Corinthian and Elean colonies) and of bilingualism in its northern part which interacted with Illyria likely did exist, but this is hardly traceable nowadays. Filos does not posit which languages were specifically substrate, adstrate or superstrate. According to Crossman it is also possible that the region on the north of Epirus that became latter known as southern Illyria was home to proto-Greek populations for some generations or centuries before they moved southward into Greece.

The distribution of epigraphic evidence would remain unequally distributed geographically; in later periods, sources still tend to come from Ambracia and Dodona, as well as Bouthrotos. The Corinthian and Elean colonies on the coast were gradually integrated into the emerging pan-Epirote political formations, resulting in increasing linguistic homogenization of the region.

=== Hellenistic and Roman periods ===
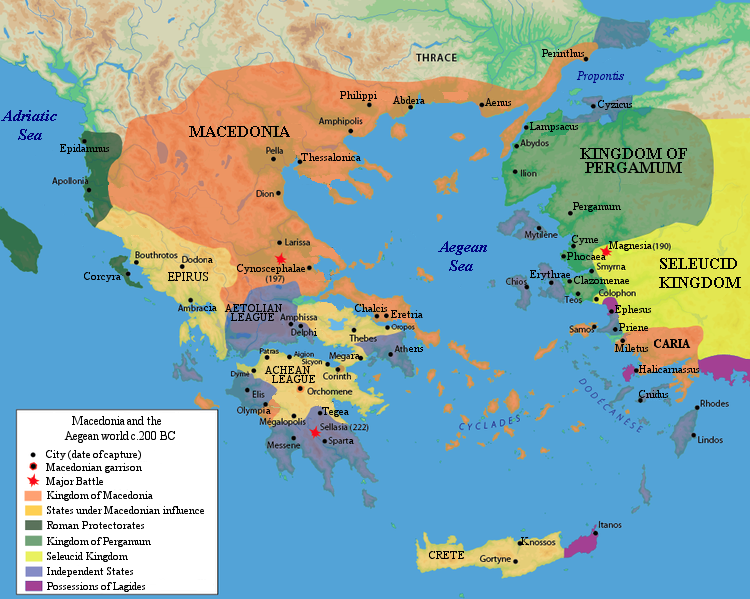
Political situation in the Greek world during the Hellenistic period

While the origins of Epirotic Greek are disputed, it is more certain that during the attested period, with its better studied corpora, there was a degree of bilingualism in the borderlands of Epirus that was likely not symmetrical in nature, and that Epirotic Greek expanded northward beyond the boundaries of Epirus proper, into former Illyrian territory. Though the distribution of texts would remain skewed in favor of Dodona and the coast, the peak of Epirote texts would occur in the late Hellenistic period, when the impact of the supraregional Northwest Doric koina began to be felt. Although the distribution remains skewed, texts from outside Dodona and Ambracia become markedly more common between the third century BCE and the Roman conquest in 167 BCE.

==== The Northwest Doric koina ====
The Northwest Doric koina was a supraregional North-West common variety that emerged in the third and second centuries BCE, and was used in the official texts of the Aetolian League. It contained a mix of native Northwest Doric dialectal elements and Attic forms. It was apparently based on the most general features of Northwest Doric, eschewing less common local traits. Its rise was driven by both linguistic and non-linguistic factors, with non-linguistic motivating factors including the spread of the rival Attic-Ionic koine after it was recruited by the Macedonian state for administration, and the political unification of a vast territories by the Aetolian League and the state of Epirus. The Northwest Doric koina was thus both a linguistic and a political rival of the Attic-Ionic koina.

The Northwest Doric koina was politically linked to the Aetolian league, which had long had a mutually hostile relationship with Epirus. As such, some have argued that Epirotic during the Hellenistic period was marked by a tendency to avoid the use of features that marked an "Aetolian" identity, such as the use of ἐν + accusative.

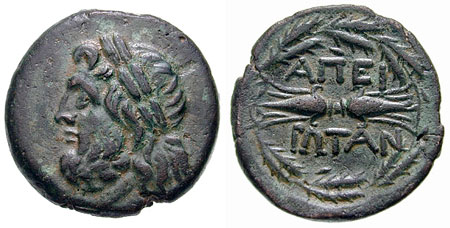
Coin of the Epirote League, depicting Zeus (left) and a lightning bolt with the word "ΑΠΕΙΡΩΤΑΝ" lit. 'of the Epirotes' (right).

==== Replacement by the Attic koine ====
Despite its success in halting the spread of Attic for a time, the Northwest Doric koina would ultimately be a mere intermediary stage before the final Atticization of Epirus. In the third and second centuries BCE texts are already encountered showing increasing influence of the Attic-Ionic koine. Statistical analyses have corroborated that Attic was slowly supplanting the native dialect during the end of this period, while the record also shows texts of Epirote embedded in Attic during this period. The Attic-Ionic koine eventually decisively established itself in Epirus firmly during the first century CE.

== Phonology ==
Our understanding of Epirote phonology is limited; epigraphic data, glosses, and contemporary sources are often uncorroborated. However the existing evidence from the limited inscriptions is still considered to have certain insights.

Epirote shared with Thessalian, Elean, and Ancient Macedonian, an "oddity" of cases where voiced stops (/b d g/, written ⟨β ð ɣ⟩) appear to correspond to Proto-Indo-European voiced aspirates, /bʰ dʰ ɡʰ/. In most Greek, the Proto-Indo-European aspirates were devoiced to voiceless aspirates /pʰ tʰ kʰ/, written ⟨ɸ θ χ⟩ (though these would later become fricatives in Attic Koine around the first century CE). As with Macedonian, this phenomenon is sometimes attributed to non-Greek substrate and adstrate influence, with some linguists attributing such an influence on Epirote to Illyrian. Filos, however, notes, that the attribution of ⟨β⟩, ⟨ð⟩ and ⟨ɣ⟩ for specifically voiced stops is not secure.

Other proposed phonological characteristics based on inscriptions include:

- regular apocope in prepositions
- no shortening for ⟨ηι⟩ (< -ēϝy-)
- early closing of /eː/ > /iː/
- short /i/ > /e/, though Filos notes that the evidence for this is particularly suspect
- early dropping of /j/ (⟨ι⟩) when it is the second element in diphthongs.
- Unlike most other NW Doric varieties, a regular shift of ⟨ɛο⟩ > ⟨ου⟩

Epirote, like Corinthian, belonged to Doris mitior, having an arsenal of seven long vowels and five short vowels. Epirote had a phonemic difference between a long front mid-open vowel /ɛ:/ and a long front mid-close vowel /e:/, and an analogous difference between /ɔ:/ and /o:/.

== Alphabet ==
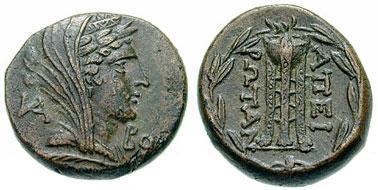
Coin depicting Dione wearing a stephane (left) and a tripod with the word "ΑΠΕΙΡΩΤΑΝ" lit. 'of the Epirotes' (right).

Because the earliest scripts from the region of Epirus (not the earliest Epirote scripts) hail from Ambracia, the letters resemble those of Corinth, because Ambracia was founded by Corinthians. Another early example using the Corinthian alphabet is the inquiry of a citizen of Orikos (Orikum), but Filos argues that this is of little use because Orikos is rather far from the center of Epirus. We do not know how many alphabets were in use in Epirus in the sixth to fourth centuries BCE.

The diversity of alphabets among the Dodona lamellae merely reflects the diverse origins of the inquirers. Although the earliest oracular sources feature the "blue" alphabet elsewhere seen in Corinth and Attica, the later instances primarily manifest what would become the local Epirote alphabet, which was a "red" Euboean system, in which the letter ⟨Ψ⟩ indicated the velar aspirate /kʰ/, which would later become /x/, while /ps/ (for which ⟨Ψ⟩ was used in Attic's "blue" alphabet) was simply written ⟨ΦΣ⟩, and ⟨X⟩ represented /ks/. From the end of the fifth century BCE onwards, this local alphabet became increasingly consistent.

Because Epirote distinguished between mid-close and mid-open round vowels, ⟨E⟩ was used for /e:/, while the mid-open /ɛ:/ was represented by a vowel letter (despite its resemblance to beta), and was also used for the short front mid vowel /e/. On the other hand, ⟨O⟩ was used for all three mid back vowels, regardless of length or whether they were mid-open or mid-close. For /i/, ⟨I⟩ was not used, but ⟨ϟ⟩ or variously ⟨Σ⟩ were instead. Many of these characteristics were shared with Corinth, or with Corfu.

The Attic alphabet made its appearance in Epirote texts (again) in the fourth century BCE. Over time, it drove all other Greek alphabets, in Epirus and elsewhere, out of usage.

== Morphology, Morphosyntax, Syntax ==
Epirote features a rather "Doric" contract future as seen in the third person active plural praksounti and the future mediopassive lachoumai. Whereas the Northwest Doric koina frequently used ἐν + accusative formations, Epirote preferred εἰς + accusative formations instead. The archaic formation of ἀνά + dative, which is elsewhere found mostly in poetry, has been found to occur a few times in Epirus. Scientific inquiry on the syntax and morphosyntax of Epirote is, to date, too weak in general to make strong statements.

== Language contact ==
Due to its geographic position and its history, Epirus had an internal linguistic diversity. Epirus' northern regions, such as Chaonia, bordered on southern Illyrian territory, and likely featured bilingualism with many (likely more) Illyrians tending to adopt Greek as well as a second language. Ultimately this would lead to language replacement with Illyrian as substrate in these regions. The extent of Illyrian participation in life in Epirus proper is uncertain; although only about a dozen names in the Dodona corpus are confirmedly Illyrian, onomastics is not necessarily a safe way to ascertain ethnic or linguistic identity in this case. On the other hand, penetration of Greek speech, including Epirote, was much more evident among the adjacent Illyrian tribes. On the Epirote coast, colonies of southern Greek provenance often spoke different dialects of Greek, but their incorporation into Epirote polities brought linguistic homogenization.

Epirote also experienced interaction with other NW Doric varieties, as well as Macedonian, as adstrates.

The war with Rome, ending in the Roman conquest of Epirus in 167 BCE, featured large-scale destruction and depopulation of Epirus, especially to the south of the Thyamis River. Further destruction was inflicted by king Mithridates VI's Thracian mercenaries in 88-87 BCE as well as during cases (such as 31 BCE) where Epirus served as a theatre for Roman civil wars. Such depopulation was followed by the settlement by Latin speakers. Although the Greek language was not effaced from the region as a result of these changes and continued to demonstrate vitality, language contact effects are demonstrated, including interference, accommodation, code-switching, hybridization, and Greco-Latin interaction in onomastics and funerary inscriptions. Latinized place names became especially common on the coastline; the impact of Latin became especially strong in Southern Illyria's urban centers of Dyrrhachium and Apollonia, and was far heavier than that of Epirus proper.

== Examples ==
=== Vocabulary ===
- ἀγχωρίξαντας anchôrixantas having transferred, postponed Chaonian (Attic metapherô, anaballô) (anchôrizo anchi near +horizô define and Doric x instead of Attic s) (Cf. Ionic anchouros neighbouring) not to be confused with Doric anchôreô Attic ana-chôreô go back, withdraw.
- ἀκαθαρτία akathartia impurity (Attic/Doric akatharsia) (Lamelles Oraculaires 14)
- ἀποτράχω apotrachô run away (Attic/Doric apotrechô)
- ἄσπαλοι aspaloi fishes Athamanian (Attic ichthyes) (Ionic chlossoi) (Cf.LSJ aspalia angling, aspalieus fisherman, aspalieuomai I angle metaph. of a lover, aspalisai: halieusai, sagêneusai. (hals sea)
- Ἄσπετος Aspetos divine epithet of Achilles in Epirus (Homeric aspetos 'unspeakable, unspeakably great, endless' (Aristotle F 563 Rose; Plutarch, Pyrrhus 1; SH 960,4)
- γνώσκω gnôskô know (Attic gignôskô) (Ionic/Koine ginôskô) (Latin nōsco)(Attic gnôsis, Latin notio knowledge) (ref. Orion p. 42.17)
- δάξα daksa, cited by Hesychius, argued by one Greek scholar to be an Illyrian loan
- διαιτός diaitos (Hshc. judge kritês) (Attic diaitêtês arbitrator) Lamelles Oraculaires 16
- ἐσκιχρέμεν eskichremen lend out πὲρ τοῖ ἀργύρροι (Lamelles Oraculaires 8 of Eubandros) (Attic eis + inf. kichranai from chraomai use)
- Ϝεῖδυς Weidus knowing (Doric Ϝειδώς) weidôs) (Elean ϝειζός weizos) (Attic εἰδώς) eidôs) (PIE *weid- "to know, to see", Sanskrit veda I know) Cabanes, L'Épire 577,50
- κάστον kaston wood Athamanian (Attic xylon from xyô scrape, hence xyston); Sanskrit kāṣṭham ("wood, timber, firewood") (Dialectical kalon wood, traditionally derived from kaiô burn kauston sth that can be burnt, kausimon fuel)
- λῃτῆρες lêïtêres Athamanian priests with garlands Hes.text ἱεροὶ στεφανοφόροι. Ἀθαμᾶνες(LSJ: lêitarchoi public priests) (hence Leitourgia
- μανύ manu small Athamanian (Attic mikron, brachu) (Cf. manon rare) (PIE *men- small, thin) (Hsch. banon thin) (manosporos thinly sown manophullos with small leaves Thphr.HP7.6.2-6.3)
- Νάϊος Naios or Naos epithet of Dodonaean Zeus (from the spring in the oracle) (cf. Naiades and Pan Naios in Pydna SEG 50:622 (Homeric naô flow, Attic nama spring) (PIE *sna-)
- παγάομαι pagaomai 'wash in the spring' (of Dodona) (Doric paga Attic pêgê running water, fountain)
- παμπασία pampasia (to ask peri pampasias cliché phrase in the oracle) (Attic pampêsia full property) (Doric paomai obtain)
- πέλειοι peleioi "old people", cited by Hesychius
- Πελιγᾶνες Peliganes or Peligones (Epirotan, Macedonian senators)
- πρᾶμι prami do optative (Attic πράττοιμι prattoimi) Syncope (Lamelles Oraculaires 22)
- τίνε tine (Attic/Doric tini) to whom (Lamelles Oraculaires 7)
- τριθυτικόν trithutikon triple sacrifice tri + thuo (Lamelles Oraculaires 138)

=== Excerpts ===
The following is one of the earliest public inscriptions in Epirote Greek. It is an honorary decree in which the Molossian citizenship is awarded to a certain Simias from Apollonia and his family:

Ἀγαθᾶι (-αῖ) τύχαι· βασ[ι]|λεύοντος Ἀλεξ|άνδρου, ἐπὶ προσ|τάτα Μολοσσῶν ||

Ἀριστομάχου Ὄμ|φαλος, γραμματ|ιστᾶ δὲ Μενεδά|μου Ὄμφαλος ἔδω|<μ>καν ἰσοπολιτε||ίαν Μολοσσῶν τ|ὸ κοινὸν Σιμίαι Ἀ|πολλωνιάται κα|τοικοῦντι ἐν Θε|πτίνωι, αὐτῶι κα||15[ὶ] γενεᾶι (-αῖ) καὶ γέν|[ει ἐκ] γενεᾶς.

"For good fortune. During the reign of Alexander, when Aristomachos from the Omphales was prostates and Menedamos from the Omphales was grammatistas, the koinon of the Molossoi awarded citizenship(-like) rights to Simias from Apollonia, who lives in Theptinos/-on, to him, his family and his descendants'."

The following is an inquiry by the diaotoi (local magistrates?), dated to either the late 5th to early 4th century BCE, or the 4th to 3rd century BCE:

ἐπερετῶντι τοὶ διαιτοὶ τὸν Δία τὸν Νάϊον καὶ τὰ̣[ν Διώναν πότερον τὰ χρήμα]|τα ἰς τὸ πρυτανῆον τὰ πὰρ τα̑ς πόλιος ἔλαβε δικαί[ως - - -] | διαιτοὺς ἀναλῶσαι ἰς τὸ πρυτανῆον δικαίως τοῦτα.

‘The diatoi ask Zeus Naios and Diona whether they lawfully received the money from the city for the prytaneion’ […] – [response] ‘The diatoi must expend that (money) for the prytaneion lawfully’
