= Carolina López-Ruiz =

Spanish classicist

Carolina López-Ruiz is a Spanish and American classicist specializing in comparative mythology, Ancient Mediterranean religions, Greek language and literature, North-West Semitic languages and literatures, and cultural exchange. She has authored several works on Phoenician civilization, and contacts between Greek and Near Eastern cultures.

López-Ruiz was born on April 21, 1972, in Chapel Hill, North Carolina (USA). She received her Licenciatura (BA-MA) in classical philology from the Autonomous University of Madrid in 1995, attended the Hebrew University of Jerusalem from 1995 to 1996, and completed her PhD at the University of Chicago in the Committee on the Ancient Mediterranean World, between 1996 and 2005.

Between 2005 and 2022, López-Ruiz was a professor in the Department of Classics and the Ohio State University. Since 2022 she is a professor of Ancient Mediterranean Religions and Mythologies at the University of Chicago Divinity School, the Department of Classics, and the Institute for the Study of Ancient Cultures (former Oriental Institute).

A leading scholar of Greek and Near Eastern mythology and Phoenician studies, some of her books have been translated into Turkish and Spanish. Her monograph Phoenicians and the Making of the Mediterranean (Harvard University Press, 2021; Spanish: Los fenicios y la construcción del Mediterráneo, Bellaterra, 2025) received three book awards, from ASOR, the Mediterranean Seminar, and the Phi Alpha Theta History Honor Society.

Since 2022 she co-directs the University of Chicago excavations at Cerro del Villar, Málaga, with David Schloen, as part of an international team headed by José Súarez Padilla of the University of Málaga.

== Selected publications ==
- López-Ruiz, Carolina; Dietler, Michael (2009). Colonial Encounters in Ancient Iberia: Phoenician, Greek, and Indigenous Relations. University of Chicago Press. ISBN 978-0-226-14848-9.
- López-Ruiz, Carolina (2010). When the Gods Were Born: Greek Cosmogonies and the Near East. Harvard University Press. ISBN 978-0-674-04946-8.
- Celestino, Sebastián; López-Ruiz, Carolina (2016). Tartessos and the Phoenicians in Iberia. Oxford University Press. ISBN 978-0-19-165337-7.
- López-Ruiz, Carolina (2018). Gods, Heroes, and Monsters: A Sourcebook of Greek, Roman, and Near Eastern Myths in Translation. Oxford University Press. ISBN 978-0-19-064481-9.
- López-Ruiz, Carolina (2020). Tarteso y los fenicios de occidente (in Spanish). ISBN 9788418578540.
- López-Ruiz, Carolina; Doak, Brian R. (2019). The Oxford Handbook of the Phoenician and Punic Mediterranean. Oxford University Press. ISBN 978-0-19-049934-1.
- López-Ruiz, Carolina (2021). Phoenicians and the Making of the Mediterranean. Harvard University Press. ISBN 978-0-674-98818-7.
- López-Ruiz, Carolina (2025). Greek Mythology: From Creation to First Humans. Oxford University Press. ISBN 9780190944803.
