= Archaeological Museum of Kozani =

Museum in Kozani, Greece

Coordinates: 40°18′8″N 21°47′7.6″E

The Archaeological Museum of Kozani is a museum in Kozani, Greece.

The museum's collection includes finds from archaeological excavations as well as from individuals from all over Kozani prefecture, apart from the Aiani area. It includes sculptures, inscriptions, statues, reliefs, clay vessels, figurines, and gold, silver, and bronze jewellery, all dating from the Palaeolithic to the Roman period.

== Gallery ==
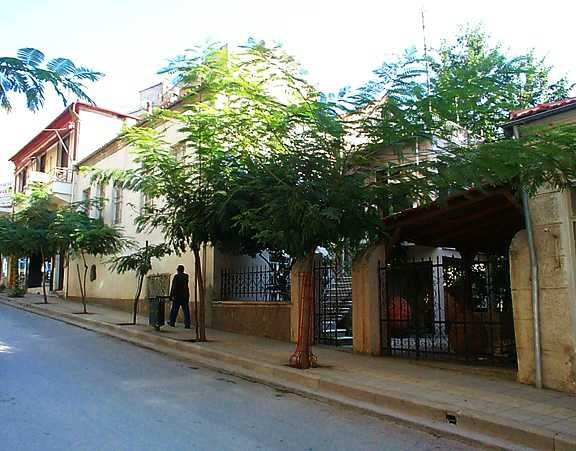
view from outside

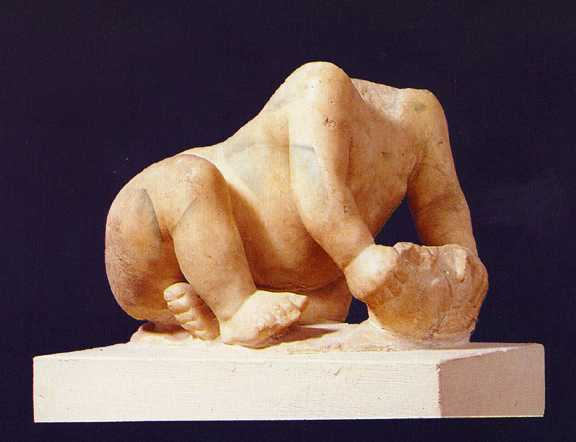
Marble statue of a boy from Mesovaio, dated to the Roman period

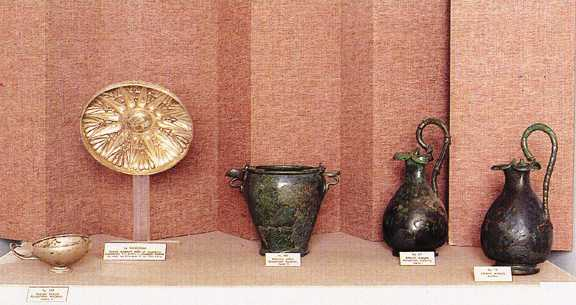
metal exhibits mainly from the necropolis of Kozani dating from the Iron Age to the 3rd century BC

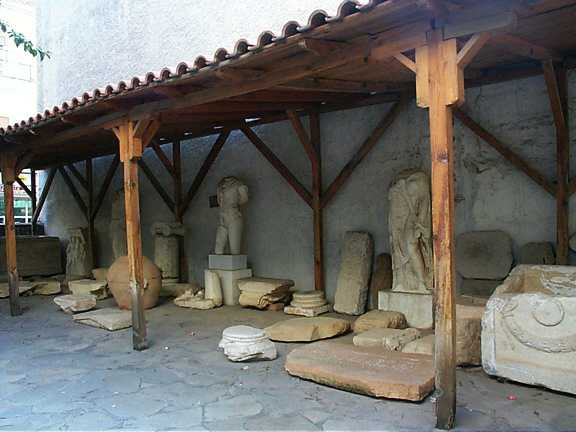
exhibits at the yard

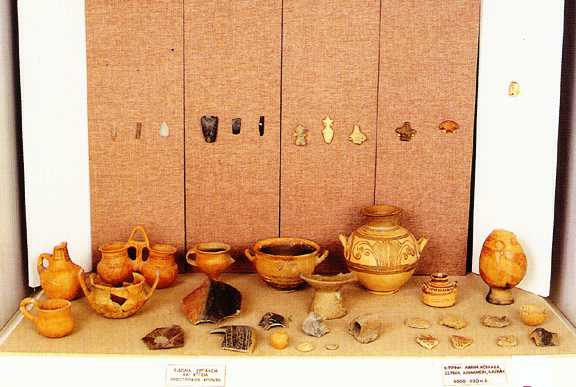
Examples of pottery, stonework, and koroplastics from all periods from Kozani prefecture

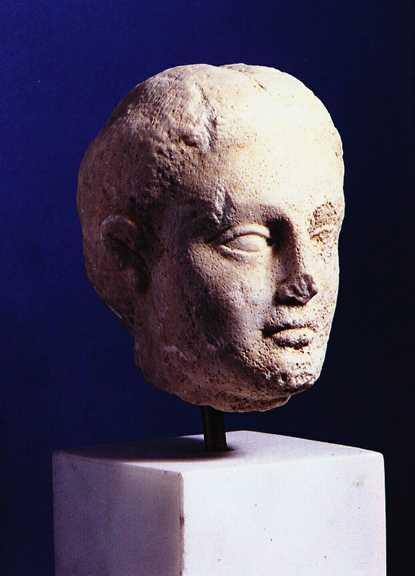
Marble head of a female statue from Elane dated to the 4th century B.C.
