= Makrygialos, Pieria =

Village in Central Macedonia, Greece

Makrygialos Μακρύγιαλος
- Community
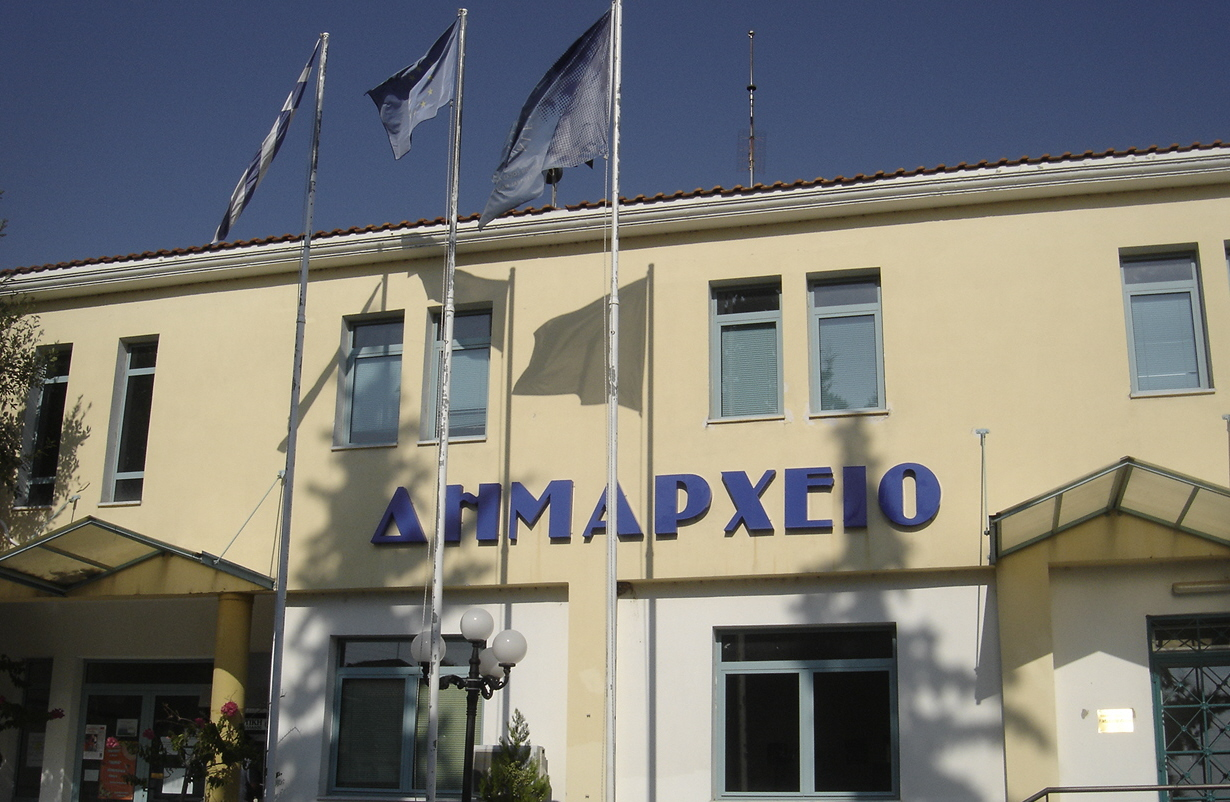
- The community hall in Makrygialos

- Location within Greece
- Coordinates: 40°25′N 22°36′E
- Country: Greece
- Administrative region: Central Macedonia
- Regional unit: Pieria
- Municipality: Pydna-Kolindros
- Municipal unit: Methoni
- Elevation: 40 m (130 ft)

Population (2021)
  - Community: 1,495
- Time zone: UTC+2 (EET)
  - Summer (DST): UTC+3 (EEST)
- Postal code: 602 00
- Area code: +30-2353
- Vehicle registration: KN

Makrygialos (Greek: Μακρύγιαλος, 'Long Beach') is a coastal village and a former municipal district in Pieria regional unit, Greece. It lies 21 km away from the town of Katerini Since the 2011 local government reform it has been part of the municipality Pydna-Kolindros, of which it is a municipal community. The 2021 census recorded 1,495 people in Makrygialos. The village is a tourist resort and many of the inhabitants are Pontians.
