= Countries in the International Organization for Standardization =

Members of ISO

There are, as of 2026, 175 members of the International Organization for Standardization. Three types of membership status can be distinguished:

- Full member (member body): sets the course for ISO standards development and strategy: participates and votes in ISO technical and policy meetings; sells and adopts ISO standards nationally.
- Correspondent member: attends ISO technical and policy meetings as an observer; sells and adopts ISO standards nationally or within their membership territory.
- Subscriber member: keeps up to date with ISO’s work, but cannot participate in it; does not sell or adopt ISO standards nationally.

== Members ==
ISO members by country
Country A2 code	Country A3 code	Country code No.	Country name (English)	Standards body	ISO status
AF	AFG	004	Afghanistan	ANSA	Member body
AL	ALB	008	Albania	DPS	Correspondent member
DZ	DZA	012	Algeria	IANOR	Member body
AO	AGO	024	Angola	IANORQ	Correspondent member
AG	ATG	028	Antigua and Barbuda	ABBS	Subscriber member
AR	ARG	032	Argentina	IRAM	Member body
AM	ARM	051	Armenia	ARMSTANDARD	Member body
AU	AUS	036	Australia	SA	Member body
AT	AUT	040	Austria	ASI	Member body
AZ	AZE	031	Azerbaijan	AZSTAND	Member body
BS	BHS	044	Bahamas	BBSQ	Correspondent member
BH	BHR	048	Bahrain	BSMD	Member body
BD	BGD	050	Bangladesh	BSTI	Member body
BB	BRB	052	Barbados	BNSI	Member body
BY	BLR	112	Belarus	BELST	Member body
BE	BEL	056	Belgium	NBN	Member body
BZ	BLZ	084	Belize	BZBS	Correspondent member
BJ	BEN	204	Benin	CEBENOR	Member body
BT	BTN	064	Bhutan	SQCA	Correspondent member
BO	BOL	068	Bolivia, Plurinational State of	IBNORCA	Correspondent member
BA	BIH	070	Bosnia and Herzegovina	BASMP	Member body
BW	BWA	072	Botswana	BOBS	Member body
BR	BRA	076	Brazil	ABNT	Member body
BN	BRN	096	Brunei Darussalam	CPRU	Correspondent member
BG	BGR	100	Bulgaria	BDS	Member body
BF	BFA	854	Burkina Faso	FASONORM	Member body
BI	BDI	108	Burundi	BBN	Correspondent member
KH	KHM	116	Cambodia	ISC	Correspondent member
CM	CMR	120	Cameroon	CDNQ	Member body
CA	CAN	124	Canada	SCC	Member body
CV	CPV	132	Cape Verde	—	
CF	CAF	140	Central African Republic	—	
TD	TCD	148	Chad	ATNOR	Correspondent member
CL	CHL	152	Chile	INN	Member body
CN	CHN	156	China	SAC	Member body
CO	COL	170	Colombia	ICONTEC	Member body
KM	COM	174	Comoros	—	
CG	COG	178	Congo	ACONOQ	Member body
CD(ZR)	COD	180	Congo, Democratic Republic of the	OCC	Member body
CR	CRI	188	Costa Rica	INTECO	Member body
CI	CIV	384	Côte d'Ivoire	CODINORM	Member body
HR	HRV	191	Croatia	HZN	Member body
CU	CUB	192	Cuba	NC	Member body
CY	CYP	196	Cyprus	CYS	Member body
CZ	CZE	203	Czech Republic	ÚNMZ	Member body
DK	DNK	208	Denmark	DS	Member body
DJ	DJI	262	Djibouti	ADN	Correspondent member
DM	DMA	212	Dominica	DBOS	Correspondent member
DO	DOM	214	Dominican Republic	INDOCAL	Member body
EC	ECU	218	Ecuador	INEN	Member body
EG	EGY	818	Egypt	EOS	Member body
SV	SLV	222	El Salvador	CONACYT	Member body
GQ	GNQ	226	Equatorial Guinea	—	
ER	ERI	232	Eritrea	ESI	Correspondent member
EE	EST	233	Estonia	EVS	Member body
SZ	SWZ	748	Eswatini	SWASA	Correspondent member
ET	ETH	231	Ethiopia	IES	Member body
FJ	FJI	242	Fiji	FTSQCO	Member body
FI	FIN	246	Finland	SFS	Member body
FR	FRA	250	France	AFNOR	Member body
GA	GAB	266	Gabon	CNTT	Member body
GM	GMB	270	Gambia	TGSB	Correspondent member
GE	GEO	268	Georgia	GEOSTM	Correspondent member
DE	DEU	276	Germany	DIN	Member body
GH	GHA	288	Ghana	GSB	Member body
GR	GRC	300	Greece	ELOT	Member body
GD	GRD	308	Grenada	GDBS	Subscriber member
GT	GTM	320	Guatemala	COGUANOR	Correspondent member
GN	GIN	324	Guinea	INNM	Correspondent member
GW	GNB	624	Guinea-Bissau	DSNPQ	
GY	GUY	328	Guyana	GNBS	Correspondent member
HT	HTI	332	Haiti	BHN	Correspondent member
HN	HND	340	Honduras	OHN	Correspondent member
HK	HKG	344	Hong Kong (China)	ITCHKSAR	Correspondent member
HU	HUN	348	Hungary	MSZT	Member body
IS	ISL	352	Iceland	IST	Member body
IN	IND	356	India	BIS	Member body
ID	IDN	360	Indonesia	BSN	Member body
IR	IRN	364	Iran, Islamic Republic of	ISIRI	Member body
IQ	IRQ	368	Iraq	COSQC	Member body
IE	IRL	372	Ireland	NSAI	Member body
IL	ISR	376	Israel	SII	Member body
IT	ITA	380	Italy	UNI	Member body
JM	JAM	388	Jamaica	JBS	Member body
JP	JPN	392	Japan	JISC	Member body
JO	JOR	400	Jordan	JISM	Member body
KZ	KAZ	398	Kazakhstan	KAZMEMST	Member body
KE	KEN	404	Kenya	KEBS	Member body
KI	KIR	296	Kiribati	—	
KP	PRK	408	Korea, Democratic People's Republic of	CSK	Member body
KR	KOR	410	Korea, Republic of	KATS	Member body
KW	KWT	414	Kuwait	KOWSMD	Member body
KG	KGZ	417	Kyrgyzstan	KYRGYZST	Correspondent member
LA	LAO	418	Lao People's Democratic Republic	DOSM	Correspondent member
LV	LVA	428	Latvia	LVS	Member body
LB	LBN	422	Lebanon	LIBNOR	Member body
LS	LSO	426	Lesotho	LSQAS	Correspondent member
LR	LBR	430	Liberia	LiSA	Correspondent member
LY	LBY	434	Libya	LNCSM	Member body
LI	LIE	438	Liechtenstein	—	
LT	LTU	440	Lithuania	LSD	Member body
LU	LUX	442	Luxembourg	ILNAS	Member body
MO	MAC	446	Macao (China)	CPTTM	Correspondent member
MG	MDG	450	Madagascar	BNM	Correspondent member
MW	MWI	454	Malawi	MBS	Member body
MY	MYS	458	Malaysia	DSM	Member body
MV	MDV	462	Maldives	—	
ML	MLI	466	Mali	MLIDNI	Member body
MT	MLT	470	Malta	MSA	Member body
MH	MHL	584	Marshall Islands	—	
MR	MRT	478	Mauritania	ONANOR	Correspondent member
MU	MUS	480	Mauritius	MSB	Member body
MX	MEX	484	Mexico	DGN	Member body
FM	FSM	583	Micronesia, Federated States of	—	
MD	MDA	498	Moldova, Republic of	ISM	Correspondent member
MC	MCO	492	Monaco	AMNOR	Member body
MN	MNG	496	Mongolia	MASM	Member body
ME	MNE	499	Montenegro	ISME	Correspondent member
MA	MAR	504	Morocco	SNIMA	Member body
MZ	MOZ	508	Mozambique	INNOQ	Correspondent member
MM	MMR	104	Myanmar	MSTRD	Correspondent member
NA	NAM	516	Namibia	NSIQO	Member body
NR	NRU	520	Nauru	—	
NP	NPL	524	Nepal	NBSM	Member body
NL	NLD	528	Netherlands	NEN	Member body
NZ	NZL	554	New Zealand	SNZ	Member body
NI	NIC	558	Nicaragua	DTNM	Correspondent member
NE	NER	562	Niger	DNQM	Correspondent member
NG	NGA	566	Nigeria	SON	Member body
MK	MKD	807	North Macedonia	ISRM	Member body
NO	NOR	578	Norway	SN	Member body
OM	OMN	512	Oman	DGSM	Member body
PK	PAK	586	Pakistan	PSQCA	Member body
PW	PLW	585	Palau	—	
PS	PSE	275	Palestine, State of	PSI	Correspondent member
PA	PAN	591	Panama	COPANIT	Member body
PG	PNG	598	Papua New Guinea	NISIT	Correspondent member
PY	PRY	600	Paraguay	INTN	Correspondent member
PE	PER	604	Peru	INACAL	Member body
PH	PHL	608	Philippines	BPS	Member body
PL	POL	616	Poland	PKN	Member body
PT	PRT	620	Portugal	IPQ	Member body
QA	QAT	634	Qatar	QS	Member body
RO	ROU	642	Romania	ASRO	Member body
RU	RUS	643	Russian Federation	GOST R	Member body
RW	RWA	646	Rwanda	RBS	Member body
KN	KNA	659	Saint Kitts and Nevis	SKNBS	Member body
LC	LCA	662	Saint Lucia	SLBS	Member body
VC	VCT	670	Saint Vincent and the Grenadines	SVGBS	Subscriber member
WS	WSM	882	Samoa	MCIL-NSS	Correspondent member
SM	SMR	674	San Marino	—	
ST	STP	678	Sao Tome and Principe	SENAPIQ STP	Correspondent member
SA	SAU	682	Saudi Arabia	SASO	Member body
SN	SEN	686	Senegal	ASN	Member body
RS	SRB	891	Serbia	ISS	Member body
SC	SYC	690	Seychelles	SBS	Correspondent member
SL	SLE	694	Sierra Leone	SLSB	Correspondent member
SG	SGP	702	Singapore	SPRING SG	Member body
SK	SVK	703	Slovakia	UNMS SR	Member body
SI	SVN	705	Slovenia	SIST	Member body
SB	SLB	090	Solomon Islands	—	
SO	SOM	706	Somalia	SoBS	Correspondent member
ZA	ZAF	710	South Africa	SABS	Member body
SS	SSD	728	South Sudan	SSNBS	Correspondent member
ES	ESP	724	Spain	AENOR	Member body
LK	LKA	144	Sri Lanka	SLSI	Member body
SD	SDN	729	Sudan	SSMO	Member body
SR	SUR	740	Suriname	SSB	Correspondent member
SE	SWE	752	Sweden	SIS	Member body
CH	CHE	756	Switzerland	SNV	Member body
SY	SYR	760	Syrian Arab Republic	SASMO	Member body
TW	TWN	158	Taiwan	BSMI/TAF	
TZ	TZA	834	Tanzania, United Republic of	TBS	Member body
TJ	TJK	762	Tajikistan	TJKSTN	Correspondent member
TH	THA	764	Thailand	TISI	Member body
TL	TLS	206	Timor-Leste	—	
TG	TGO	768	Togo	ATN	Member body
TO	TON	776	Tonga	MCCTIL-TSCC	Subscriber member
TT	TTO	780	Trinidad and Tobago	TTBS	Member body
TN	TUN	788	Tunisia	INNORPI	Member body
TR	TUR	792	Turkey	TSE	Member body
TM	TKM	795	Turkmenistan	MSST	Correspondent member
TV	TUV	798	Tuvalu	—	
UG	UGA	800	Uganda	UNBS	Member body
UA	UKR	804	Ukraine	SE UkrNDNC	Member body
AE	ARE	784	United Arab Emirates	ESMA	Member body
GB	GBR	826	United Kingdom of Great Britain and Northern Ireland	BSI	Member body
US	USA	840	United States of America	ANSI	Member body
UY	URY	858	Uruguay	UNIT	Member body
UZ	UZB	860	Uzbekistan	UZSTANDARD	Member body
VU	VUT	548	Vanuatu	VBS	Member body
VA	VAT	336	Vatican City	—	
VE	VEN	862	Venezuela, Bolivarian Republic of	SENCAMER	Correspondent member
VN	VNM	704	Viet Nam	TCVN	Member body
EH	ESH	732	Western Sahara	—	
YE	YEM	887	Yemen	YSMO	Member body
ZM	ZMB	894	Zambia	ZABS	Correspondent member
ZW	ZWE	816	Zimbabwe	SAZ	Member body

== Map ==
A map of standards bodies who are ISO members as of November 2020 Key: Members Correspondent members Subscriber members Other places with an ISO 3166-1 code who are not members of ISO

== See also ==
- International Organization for Standardization
- ISO country code
- List of technical standard organizations
