= List of technical standard organizations =

This is a list of technical standardization organizations.

== International standards organizations ==
- 3GPP – 3rd Generation Partnership Project
- 3GPP2 – 3rd Generation Partnership Project 2
- ABYC – The American Boat & Yacht Council (ABYC is an international organization, despite its name)
- Accellera – Accellera Organization
- A4L – Access for Learning Community (formerly known as the Schools Interoperability Framework)
- AES – Audio Engineering Society
- AHRI – Air-conditioning, Heating, and Refrigeration Institute
- ASAM – Association for Automation and Measuring Systems
- ASHRAE – American Society of Heating, Refrigerating and Air-Conditioning Engineers (ASHRAE is an international organization, despite its name)
- ASME – American Society of Mechanical Engineers
- ASTM International – American Society for Testing and Materials
- ATIS – Alliance for Telecommunications Industry Solutions
- AUTOSAR – AUTomotive Open System ARchitecture
- BIPM, CGPM, and CIPM – Bureau International des Poids et Mesures and the related organizations established under the Metre Convention of 1875
- CableLabs – Cable Television Laboratories
- CCC – Car Connectivity Consortium
- CCSDS – Consultative Committee for Space Data Sciences
- CIE – International Commission on Illumination
- CISPR – International Special Committee on Radio Interference
- CFA – Compact flash association
- DCMI – Dublin Core Metadata Initiative
- DDEX – Digital Data Exchange
- DMSC – Digital Metrology Standards Consortium
- DMTF – Distributed Management Task Force
- Ecma International – Ecma International (previously called ECMA)
- EKOenergy – EKOenergy Network managed by environmental NGOs
- FAO – Food and Agriculture Organization of the United Nations
- FAI – Fédération Aéronautique Internationale
- GS1 – Global supply chain standards (identification numbers, barcodes, electronic commerce transactions, RFID)
- HGI – Home Gateway Initiative
- HFSB – Hedge Fund Standards Board
- HROpen – Human Resource (HR) data exchange standards body
- IABTL – IAB Tech Lab (Advertising Technology Standards)
- IATA – International Air Transport Association
- ICAO – International Civil Aviation Organization
- IEC – International Electrotechnical Commission
- IEEE – Institute of Electrical and Electronics Engineers
  - IEEE-SA – IEEE Standards Association
- IETF – Internet Engineering Task Force
- IFOAM – International Federation of Organic Agriculture Movements
- IFSWF – International Forum of Sovereign Wealth Funds
- IMO – International Maritime Organization
- IMS – IMS Global Learning Consortium
- ISO – International Organization for Standardization
- ISSN -International Standard Serial Number centre
- IPTC – International Press Telecommunications Council
- ITU – The International Telecommunication Union
  - ITU-R – ITU Radiocommunications Sector (formerly known as CCIR)
  - ITU-T – ITU Telecommunications Sector (formerly known as CCITT)
  - ITU-D – ITU Telecom Development (formerly known as BDT)
- IUPAC – International Union of Pure and Applied Chemistry
- Khronos Group – Khronos Group
- Liberty Alliance – Liberty Alliance
- Media Grid – Media Grid Standards Organization
- NACE International – Formerly known as National Association of Corrosion Engineers
- NEMA – National Electrical Manufacturers Association
- OASIS – Organization for the Advancement of Structured Information Standards
- OCF – Open Connectivity Foundation
- OGC – Open Geospatial Consortium
- OHICC – Organization of Hotel Industry Classification & Certification
- OIF – Optical Internetworking Forum
- OMA – Open Mobile Alliance
- OMG – Object Management Group
- OGF – Open Grid Forum (merger of Global Grid Forum (GGF) and Enterprise Grid Alliance (EGA))
- OpenTravel Alliance – OpenTravel Alliance (previously known as OTA)
- OSGi – OSGi Alliance
- PESC – P20 Education Standards Council
- RISC-V International — develops and maintains the open RISC-V instruction set architecture
- SAE – SAE International, formerly named the Society of Automotive Engineers
- SAI – Social Accountability International
- SDA – Secure Digital Association
- SNIA – Storage Networking Industry Association
- SMPTE – Society of Motion Picture and Television Engineers
- SSDA – Solid State Drive Alliance
- The Open Group – The Open Group
- TIA – Telecommunications Industry Association
- TM Forum – Telemanagement Forum
- UIC – International Union of Railways
- UL – Underwriters Laboratories
- Unicode Consortium – Unicode Consortium
- UPU – Universal Postal Union
- WMO – World Meteorological Organization
- W3C – World Wide Web Consortium
- WSA – Website Standards Association
- WHO biological standards – Mostly developed by NIBSC
- XSF – The XMPP Standards Foundation

== Regional standards organizations ==
=== Africa ===
- ARSO – African Organization for Standardisation
- SADCSTAN – Southern African Development Community (SADC) Cooperation in Standardization
- SON – Standard Organization of Nigeria

=== Americas ===
- COPANT – Pan American Standards Commission
- AMN – MERCOSUR Standardization Association
- CROSQ – CARICOM Regional Organization for Standards and Quality
- AAQG – America's Aerospace Quality Group

=== Asia Pacific ===
- PASC – Pacific Area Standards Congress
- ACCSQ – ASEAN Consultative Committee for Standards and Quality

=== Europe ===
- CEN – European Committee for Standardization
- CENELEC – European Committee for Electrotechnical Standardization
- ECSS – European Cooperation for Space Standardization
- EIGA – European Industrial Gases Association
- ETSI – European Telecommunications Standards Institute
- EURAMET – European Association of National Metrology Institutes
- IRMM – Institute for Reference Materials and Measurements (European Union)
- EASC – Euro-Asian Council for Standardization, Metrology and Certification
- RoyalCert International Registrars
- WELMEC – European Cooperation in Legal Metrology

=== Middle East ===
- AIDMO – Arab Industrial Development and Mining Organization
- IAU* – International Arabic Union

== Nationally-based standards organizations ==
This list is not limited to ISO members.

- Afghanistan – ANSA – Afghan National Standard Authority
- Algeria – IANOR – Institut algérien de normalisation
- Argentina – IRAM – Instituto Argentino de Normalización
- Armenia – SARM – National Institute of Standards and Quality
- Australia – SA – Standards Australia
- Austria – ASI – Austrian Standards International
- Bahrain – BSMD
- Bangladesh – BSTI – Bangladesh Standards and Bangladesh Standards and Testing Institution
- Barbados – BNSI – Barbados National Standards Institution
- Belarus – BELST – Committee for Standardization, Metrology and Certification of Belarus
- Belgium – NBN – Bureau voor Normalisatie/Bureau de Normalisation (formerly: IBN/BIN)
- Belgium – BEC / CEB – The Belgian Electrotechnical Committee – Belgisch Elektrotechnisch Comité – Comité Electrotechnique Belge
- Bolivia – IBNORCA – Instituto Boliviano de Normalización y Calidad
- Botswana – BOBS – Botswana Bureau of Standards
- Bosnia and Herzegovina – BASMP – Institute for Standards, Metrology and Intellectual Property of Bosnia and Herzegovina
- Brazil – ABNT – Associação Brasileira de Normas Técnicas
- Brunei Darussalam – CPRU – Construction Planning and Research Unit, Ministry of Development
- Bulgaria – BDS – Bulgarian Institute for Standardization
- Canada
  - SCC – Standards Council of Canada
  - CSA – Canadian Standards Association
  - Centre for Study of Insurance Operations
- Chile – INN – Instituto Nacional de Normalizacion
- China – SAC – Standardization Administration of China
- China – CSSN – China Standards Information Center
- Colombia – ICONTEC – Instituto Colombiano de Normas Tecnicas y Certificación
- Costa Rica – INTECO – Instituto de Normas Técnicas de Costa Rica
- Croatia – DZNM – State Office for Standardization and Metrology
- Cuba – NC – Oficina Nacional de Normalización
- Czech Republic – CSNI – Czech Standards Institute
- Denmark – DS – Dansk Standard
- Ecuador – INEN – Instituto Ecuatoriano de Normalización
- Egypt – EO – Egyptian Organization for Standardization and Quality Control
- El Salvador – CONACYT – Consejo Nacional de Ciencia y Tecnología
- Estonia – EVS – Eesti Standardikeskus
- Ethiopia – QSAE – Quality and Standards Authority of Ethiopia
- Finland – SFS – Finnish Standards Association
- France – AFNOR – Association française de normalisation
- Germany
  - DIN – Deutsches Institut für Normung
  - DKE – Deutsche Kommission für Elektrotechnik Elektronik Informationstechnik in DIN und VDE
  - Deutsches Institut für Bautechnik
- Georgia – GEOSTM – Georgian National Agency for Standards, Technical Regulations and Metrology
- Ghana GSA- Ghana Standards Authority
- Greece – ELOT – Hellenic Organization for Standardization
- Grenada – GDBS – Grenada Bureau of Standards
- Guatemala – COGUANOR – Comisión Guatemalteca de Normas
- Guyana – GNBS – Guyana National Bureau of Standards
- Hong Kong – ITCHKSAR – Innovation and Technology Commission
- Hungary – MSZT – Magyar Szabványügyi Testület
- Iceland – IST – Icelandic Council for Standardization
- India – BIS – Bureau of Indian Standards
- Indonesia – BSN – Badan Standardisasi Nasional
- Iran – INSO – Iran National Standards Organization
- Ireland – NSAI – National Standards Authority of Ireland
- Israel – SII – The Standards Institution of Israel
- Italy – UNI – Ente Nazionale Italiano di Unificazione
- Jamaica – BSJ – Bureau of Standards, Jamaica
- Japan – JISC – Japan Industrial Standards Committee
- Jordan – JISM – Jordan Institution for Standards and Metrology
- Kazakhstan – KAZMEMST – Committee for Standardization, Metrology and Certification
- Kenya – KEBS – Kenya Bureau of Standards
- Republic of Korea – KATS – Korean Agency for Technology and Standards
- Kuwait – KOWSMD – Public Authority for Industry, Standards and Industrial Services Affairs
- Kyrgyzstan – KYRGYZST – State Inspection for Standardization and Metrology
- Latvia – LVS – Latvian Standard
- Lebanon – LIBNOR – Lebanese Standards Institution
- Lithuania – LST – Lithuanian Standards Board
- Luxembourg – SEE – Service de l'Energie de l'Etat, Organisme Luxembourgeois de Normalisation
- Malaysia – DSM – Department of Standards Malaysia
- Malta – MSA – Malta Standards Authority
- Mauritius – MSB – Mauritius Standards Bureau
- Mexico – DGN – Dirección General de Normas
- Moldova – MOLDST – Department of Standardization and Metrology
- Morocco – SNIMA – Service de Normalisation Industrielle Marocaine
- Nepal – NBSM— Nepal Bureau of Standards and Metrology
- Netherlands – NEN – Nederlandse Norm, maintained by the Nederlands Normalisatie Instituut (NNI)
- New Zealand – SNZ – Standards New Zealand
- Nicaragua – DTNM – Dirección de Tecnología, Normalización y Metrología
- Nigeria – SON – Standards Organisation of Nigeria
- Norway – SN – Standards Norway (Standard Norge)
- Oman – DGSM – Directorate General for Specifications and Measurements
- Pakistan – PSQCA – Pakistan Standards and Quality Control Authority
- Palestine – PSI – Palestine Standards Institution
- Panama – COPANIT – Comisión Panameña de Normas Industriales y Técnicas
- Papua New Guinea – NISIT – National Institute of Standards and Industrial Technology
- Paraguay – INTN – Instituto Nacional de Tecnología, Normalización
- Peru – INDECOPI – Instituto Nacional de Defensa de la Competencia y de la Protección de la Propiedad Intellectual
- Philippines – BPS – Bureau of Product Standards
- Poland – PKN – Polish Committee for Standardization
- Portugal – IPQ – Instituto Português da Qualidade
- Romania – ASRO – Asociatia de Standardizare din România
- Russian Federation – Rosstandart – Federal Technical Regulation and Metrology Agency
- Saint Lucia – SLBS – Saint Lucia Bureau of Standards
- Saudi Arabia – SASO & SABER Certificate – Saudi Arabian Standards Organization
- Serbia and Montenegro – ISSM -Institution for Standardization of Serbia and Montenegro
- Seychelles – SBS – Seychelles Bureau of Standards
- Singapore – SPRING SG – Standards, Productivity and Innovation Board
- Slovakia – SUTN – Slovak Standards Institute
- Slovenia – SIST – Slovenian Institute for Standardization
- Somalia – SOBS – Somali Bureau of Standards
- South Africa – SABS – South African Bureau of Standards
- Spain – UNE— Asociación Española de Normalización y Certificación (AENOR)
- Sri Lanka – SLSI – Sri Lanka Standards Institution
- Suriname – SSB – Suriname Standards Bureau
- Sweden – SIS – Swedish Standards Institute
- Switzerland – SNV – Swiss Association for Standardization
- Syrian Arab Republic – SASMO – The Syrian Arab Organization for Standardization and Metrology
- Taiwan (Republic of China) – BSMI – The Bureau of Standards, Metrology and Inspection
- Tanzania – TBS – Tanzania Bureau of Standards
- Thailand – TISI – Thai Industrial Standards Institute
- Trinidad and Tobago – TTBS – Trinidad and Tobago Bureau of Standards
- Turkey – TSE – Türk Standardlari Enstitüsü
- Uganda – UNBS – Uganda National Bureau of Standards
- Ukraine – DSSU – State Committee for Technical Regulation and Consumer Policy of Ukraine
- United Arab Emirates – ESMA – Emirates Standardization and Metrology Association
- United Kingdom
  - BSI – British Standards Institution aka BSI Group
  - DStan – UK Defence Standardization
- United States of America
  - ANSI – American National Standards Institute
  - ACI – American Concrete Institute
  - NISO – National Information Standards Organization
  - NIST – National Institute of Standards and Technology
- Uruguay – UNIT – Instituto Uruguayo de Normas Técnicas
- Venezuela – FONDONORMA – Fondo para la Normalización y Certificación de la Calidad
- Vietnam – TCVN – Directorate for Standards and Quality

== See also ==
- List of free and open-source software organizations
- Standards organization
- Technical Standard
