= Standards organization =

Organization that develops standards

A standards organization, standards body, standards developing organization (SDO), or standards setting organization (SSO) is an organization whose primary function is developing, coordinating, promulgating, revising, amending, reissuing, interpreting, or otherwise contributing to the usefulness of technical standards to those who employ them. Such an organization works to create uniformity across producers, consumers, government agencies, and other relevant parties regarding terminology, product specifications (e.g. size, including units of measure), protocols, and more. Its goals could include ensuring that Company A's external hard drive works on Company B's computer, an individual's blood pressure measures the same with Company C's sphygmomanometer as it does with Company D's, or that all shirts that should not be ironed have the same icon (a clothes iron crossed out with an X) on the label.

Most standards are voluntary in the sense that they are offered for adoption by people or industry without being mandated in law. Some standards become mandatory when they are adopted by regulators as legal requirements in particular domains, often for the purpose of safety or for consumer protection from deceitful practices.

The term formal standard refers specifically to a specification that has been approved by a standards setting organization. The term de jure standard refers to a standard mandated by legal requirements or refers generally to any formal standard. In contrast, the term de facto standard refers to a specification (or protocol or technology) that has achieved widespread use and acceptance – often without being approved by any standards organization (or receiving such approval only after it already has achieved widespread use). Examples of de facto standards that were not approved by any standards organizations (or at least not approved until after they were in widespread de facto use) include the Hayes command set developed by Hayes, Apple's TrueType font design and the PCL protocol used by Hewlett-Packard in the computer printers they produced.

Normally, the term standards organization is not used to refer to the individual parties participating within the standards developing organization in the capacity of founders, benefactors, stakeholders, members or contributors, who themselves may function as or lead the standards organizations.

== History ==
=== Standardization ===
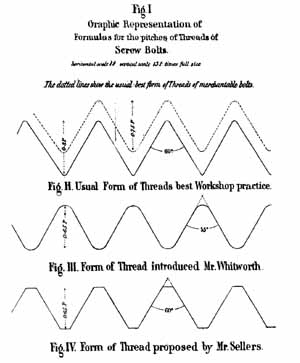
Graphic representation of formulae for the pitches of threads of screw bolts

The implementation of standards in industry and commerce became highly important with the onset of the Industrial Revolution and the need for high-precision machine tools and interchangeable parts. Henry Maudslay developed the first industrially practical screw-cutting lathe in 1800, which allowed for the standardization of screw thread sizes for the first time.

Maudslay's work, as well as the contributions of other engineers, accomplished a modest amount of industry standardization; some companies' in-house standards also began to spread more widely within their industries. Joseph Whitworth's screw thread measurements were adopted as the first (unofficial) national standard by companies around Britain in 1841. It came to be known as the British Standard Whitworth, and was widely adopted in other countries.

=== Early standards organizations ===
By the end of the 19th century differences in standards between companies was making trade increasingly difficult and strained. For instance, in 1895 an iron and steel dealer recorded his displeasure in The Times: "Architects and engineers generally specify such unnecessarily diverse types of sectional material or given work that anything like economical and continuous manufacture becomes impossible. In this country no two professional men are agreed upon the size and weight of a girder to employ for given work".

The Engineering Standards Committee was established in London in 1901 as the world's first national standards body. It subsequently extended its standardization work and became the British Engineering Standards Association in 1918, adopting the name British Standards Institution in 1931 after receiving its Royal Charter in 1929. The national standards were adopted universally throughout the country, and enabled the markets to act more rationally and efficiently

, with an increased level of cooperation.

After the First World War, similar national bodies were established in other countries. The Deutsches Institut für Normung was set up in Germany in 1917, followed by its counterparts, the American National Standard Institute and the French Commission Permanente de Standardisation, both in 1918.

=== International organizations ===
Several international organizations create international standards, such as Codex Alimentarius in food, the World Health Organization Guidelines in health, or ITU Recommendations in ICT and being publicly funded, are freely available for consideration and use worldwide.

=== International standards associations ===
In 1904, Crompton represented Britain at the Louisiana Purchase Exposition in St. Louis, Missouri, as part of a delegation by the Institute of Electrical Engineers. He presented a paper on standardization, which was so well received that he was asked to look into the formation of a commission to oversee the process. By 1906, his work was complete and he drew up a permanent terms for the International Electrotechnical Commission. The body held its first meeting that year in London, with representatives from 14 countries. In honour of his contribution to electrical standardization, Lord Kelvin was elected as the body's first President.

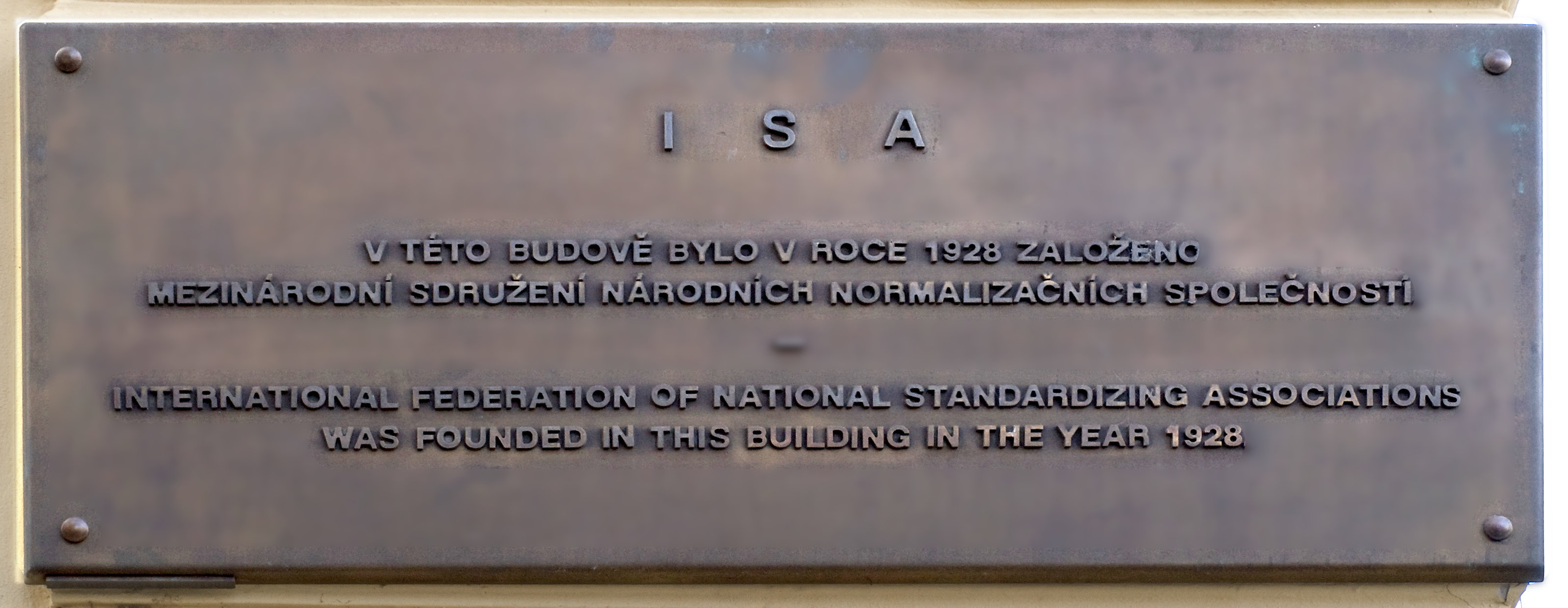
Memorial plaque of founding ISA in Prague

The International Federation of the National Standardizing Associations (ISA) was founded in 1926 with a broader remit to enhance international cooperation for all technical standards and specifications. The body was suspended in 1942 during World War II.

After the war, ISA was approached by the recently formed United Nations Standards Coordinating Committee (UNSCC) with a proposal to form a new global standards body. In October 1946, ISA and UNSCC delegates from 25 countries met in London and agreed to join forces to create the new International Organization for Standardization; the new organization officially began operations in February 1947.

== Overview ==
Standards organizations can be classified by their role, position, and the extent of their influence on the local, national, regional, and global standardization arena.

By geographic designation, there are international, regional, and national standards bodies (the latter often referred to as NSBs). By technology or industry designation, there are standards developing organizations (SDOs) and also standards setting organizations (SSOs) also known as consortia. Standards organizations may be governmental, quasi-governmental or non-governmental entities. Quasi- and non-governmental standards organizations are often non-profit organizations.

=== International standards organizations ===
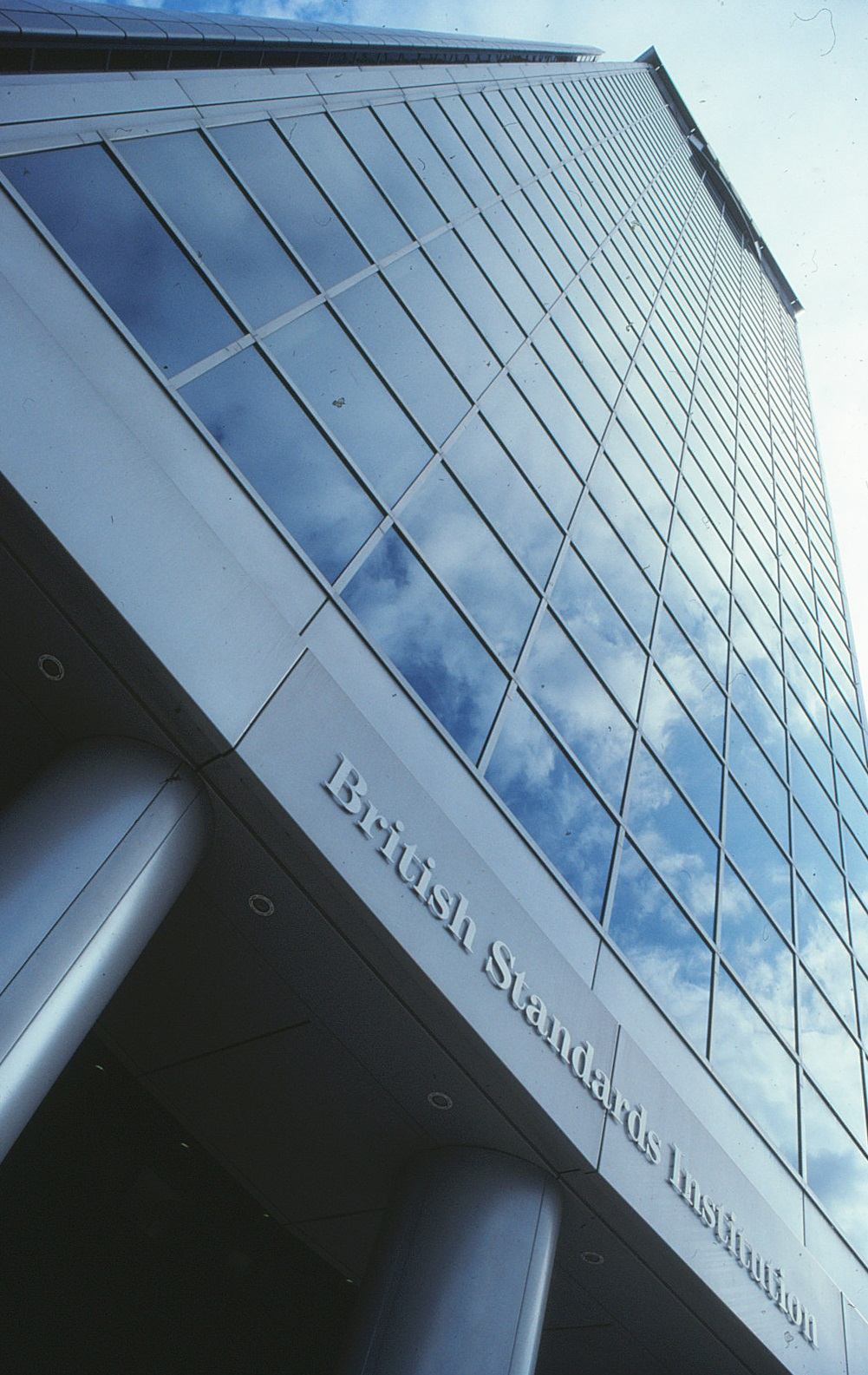
The British Standards Institution building as it appeared in 1997

Broadly, an international standards organization develops international standards (this does not necessarily restrict the use of other published standards internationally).

There are many international standards organizations. The three largest and most well-established such organizations are the International Organization for Standardization (ISO), the International Electrotechnical Commission (IEC), and the International Telecommunication Union (ITU), which have each existed for more than 50 years (founded in 1947, 1906, and 1865, respectively) and are all based in Geneva, Switzerland. They have established tens of thousands of standards covering almost every conceivable topic. Many of these are then adopted worldwide replacing various incompatible "homegrown" standards. Many of these standards are naturally evolved from those designed in-house within an industry, or by a particular country, while others have been built from scratch by groups of experts who sit on various technical committees (TCs). These three organizations together comprise the World Standards Cooperation (WSC) alliance.

ISO is composed of the national standards bodies (NSBs), one per member economy. The IEC is similarly composed of national committees, one per member economy. In some cases, the national committee to the IEC of an economy may also be the ISO member from that country or economy. ISO and IEC are private international organizations that are not established by any international treaty. Their members may be non-governmental organizations or governmental agencies, as selected by ISO and IEC (which are privately established organizations).

The ITU is a treaty-based organization established as a permanent agency of the United Nations, in which governments are the primary members, although other organizations (such as non-governmental organizations and individual companies) can also hold a form of direct membership status in the ITU as well. Another example of a treaty-based international standards organization with government membership is the Codex Alimentarius Commission.

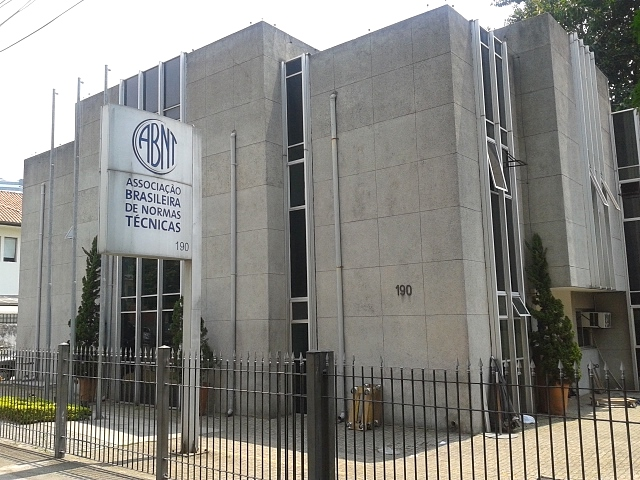
Associação Brasileira de Normas Técnicas building, as seen in 2014

In addition to these, a large variety of independent international standards organizations such as the ASME, ASTM International, the International Commission on Illumination (CIE), the IEEE, the Internet Engineering Task Force (IETF), SAE International, TAPPI, the World Wide Web Consortium (W3C), and the Universal Postal Union (UPU) develop and publish standards for a variety of international uses. In many such cases, these international standards organizations are not based on the principle of one member per country. Rather, membership in such organizations is open to those interested in joining and willing to agree to the organization's by-laws – having either organizational/corporate or individual technical experts as members.

The Airlines Electronic Engineering Committee (AEEC) was formed in 1949 to prepare avionics system engineering standards with other aviation organizations RTCA, EUROCAE, and ICAO. The standards are widely known as the ARINC Standards.

=== Regional standards organizations ===
Regional standards bodies also exist, such as the European Committee for Standardization (CEN), the European Committee for Electrotechnical Standardization (CENELEC), the European Telecommunications Standards Institute (ETSI), and the Institute for Reference Materials and Measurements (IRMM) in Europe, the Pacific Area Standards Congress (PASC), the Pan American Standards Commission (COPANT), the African Organisation for Standardisation (ARSO), the Arabic industrial development and mining organization (AIDMO), and others.

In the European Union, only standards created by CEN, CENELEC, and ETSI are recognized as European standards (according to Regulation (EU) No 1025/2012), and member states are required to notify the European Commission and each other about all the draft technical regulations concerning ICT products and services before they are adopted in national law. These rules were laid down in Directive 98/34/EC with the goal of providing transparency and control with regard to technical regulations.

Sub-regional standards organizations also exist such as the MERCOSUR Standardization Association (AMN), the CARICOM Regional Organisation for Standards and Quality (CROSQ), and the ASEAN Consultative Committee for Standards and Quality (ACCSQ), EAC East Africa Standards Committee www.eac-quality.net, and the GCC Standardization Organization (GSO) for Arab States of the Persian Gulf.

=== National standards bodies ===
In general, each country or economy has a single recognized national standards body (NSB). A national standards body is likely the sole member from that economy in ISO; ISO currently has 161 members. National standards bodies usually do not prepare the technical content of standards, which instead is developed by national technical societies.

Example national standards bodies
Organization	Initials	Country
American National Standards Institute	ANSI	United States
Asociación Española de Normalización y Certificación, Spanish Association for Standardization and Certification	AENOR	Spain
Association Française de Normalisation, French Association for Standardization	AFNOR	France
Badan Standardisasi Nasional	BSN	Indonesia
Bangladesh Standards and Testing Institution	BSTI	Bangladesh
Belize Bureau of Standards	BBS	Belize
Brazilian National Standards Organization	ABNT	Brazil
British Standards Institution	BSI	United Kingdom
Bulgarian Institute for Standardization	BDS	Bulgaria
Bureau voor Normalisatie/Bureau de Normalisation	NBN	Belgium
Bureau of Indian Standards	BIS	India
Bureau of Standards Jamaica	BSJ	Jamaica
Dirección General de Normas	DGN	Mexico
Deutsches Institut für Normung	DIN	Germany
Eesti Standardimis- ja Akrediteerimiskeskus, Estonian Centre for Standardisation	EVS	Estonia
Ente Nazionale Italiano di Unificazione	UNI	Italy
Euro-Asian Council for Standardization, Metrology and Certification	GOST	Russia (Soviet Union) and CIS
Finnish Standards Association	SFS	Finland
Institut Luxembourgeois de la normalisation, de l’Accréditation, de la Sécurité et qualité des produits et services, Luxembourg Institute for Standardization, Accreditation, Security, and Quality of Products and Services	ILNAS	Luxembourg
Instituto Argentino de Normalización y Certificación	IRAM	Argentina
Instituto Colombiano de Normas Técnicas y Certificación, Colombian Institute of Technical Standards and Certification	ICONTEC	Colombia
Japanese Industrial Standards Committee	JISC	Japan
Koninklijk Nederlands Normalisatie Instituut	NEN	Netherlands
Korean Agency for Technology and Standards	KATS	South Korea
Magyar Szabványügyi Testület, Hungarian Standards Institution	MSZT	Hungary
Organismul Național de Standardizare, Romanian Standards Association	ASRO	Romania
Polski Komitet Normalizacyjny, Polish Committee for Standardization	PKN	Poland
South African Bureau of Standards	SABS	South Africa
Standardization Administration of China	GB	China
Standards Council of Canada	SCC	Canada
Standards New Zealand	SNZ	New Zealand
Standards Norway	SN	Norway
Standards Organisation of Nigeria	SON	Nigeria
Swedish Standards Institute	SIS	Sweden
Swiss Association for Standardization	SNV	Switzerland
Turkish Standards Institution	TSE	Turkey
Standards Australia	SAI	Australia
Jabatan Standard Malaysia	DSM	Malaysia
Instituto Português da Qualidade, Portuguese Institute for Quality	IPQ	Portugal
Vietnam National Standards & Quality Institute	TCVN	Vietnam

NSBs may be either public or private sector organizations, or combinations of the two. For example, the Standards Council of Canada is a Canadian Crown Corporation, Dirección General de Normas is a governmental agency within the Mexican Ministry of Economy, and ANSI is a 501(c)(3) non-profit U.S. organization with members from both the private and public sectors. The National Institute of Standards and Technology (NIST), the U.S. government's standards agency, cooperates with ANSI under a memorandum of understanding to collaborate on the United States Standards Strategy. The determinates of whether an NSB for a particular economy is a public or private sector body may include the historical and traditional roles that the private sector fills in public affairs in that economy or the development stage of that economy. Besides that, NSBs are not necessarily known or operating under the same name and designation to the standard systems that they govern, for example, the Euro-Asian Council for Standardization, Metrology and Certification (EASC) overseeing GOST, or Standardization Administration of PR China (SAC) overseeing the National Standards of China(GB).

=== Standards developing organizations (SDOs) ===
A national standards body (NSB) generally refers to one standardization organization that is that country's member of the ISO. A standards developing organization (SDO) is one of the thousands of industry- or sector-based standards organizations that develop and publish industry specific standards. Some economies feature only an NSB with no other SDOs. Large economies like the United States and Japan have several hundred SDOs, many of which are coordinated by the central NSBs of each country (ANSI and JISC in this case). In some cases, international industry-based SDOs such as the CIE, the IEEE and the Audio Engineering Society (AES) may have direct liaisons with international standards organizations, having input to international standards without going through a national standards body. SDOs are differentiated from standards setting organizations (SSOs) in that SDOs may be accredited to develop standards using open and transparent processes.

=== Scope of work ===
Developers of technical standards are generally concerned with interface standards, which detail how products interconnect with each other, and safety standards, which established characteristics ensure that a product or process is safe for humans, animals, and the environment. The subject of their work can be narrow or broad. Another area of interest is in defining how the behavior and performance of products is measured and described in data sheets.

Overlapping or competing standards bodies tend to cooperate purposefully, by seeking to define boundaries between the scope of their work, and by operating in a hierarchical fashion in terms of national, regional and international scope; international organizations tend to have as members national organizations; and standards emerging at national level (such as BS 5750) can be adopted at regional levels (BS 5750 was adopted as EN 29000) and at international levels (BS 5750 was adopted as ISO 9000).

Unless adopted by a government, standards carry no force in law. However, most jurisdictions have truth in advertising laws, and ambiguities can be reduced if a company offers a product that is "compliant" with a standard.

=== Standards development process ===
When an organization develops standards that may be used openly, it is common to have formal rules published regarding the process. This may include:

- Who is allowed to vote and provide input on new or revised standards
- What is the formal step-by-step process
- How are bias and commercial interests handled
- How negative votes or ballots are handled
- What type of consensus is required

Though it can be a tedious and lengthy process, formal standard setting is essential to developing new technologies. For example, since 1865, the telecommunications industry has depended on the ITU to establish the telecommunications standards that have been adopted worldwide. The ITU has created numerous telecommunications standards including telegraph specifications, allocation of telephone numbers, interference protection, and protocols for a variety of communications technologies. The standards that are created through standards organizations lead to improved product quality, ensured interoperability of competitors' products, and they provide a technological baseline for future research and product development. Formal standard setting through standards organizations has numerous benefits for consumers including increased innovation, multiple market participants, reduced production costs, and the efficiency effects of product interchangeability. To support the standard development process, ISO published Good Standardization Practices (GSP) and the WTO Technical Barriers to Trade (TBT) Committee published the "Six Principles" guiding members in the development of international standards.

=== Standards distribution and copyright ===
Some standards—such as the SIF Specification in K12 education—are managed by a non-profit organization composed of public entities and private entities working in cooperation that then publish the standards under an open license at no charge and requiring no registration.

A technical library at a university may have copies of technical standards on hand. Major libraries in large cities may also have access to many technical standards.

Some users of standards mistakenly assume that all standards are in the public domain. This assumption is correct only for standards produced by certain central governments whose publications are not amenable to copyright or to organizations that issue their standard under an open license. Any standards produced by non-governmental entities remain the intellectual property of their developers (unless specifically designed otherwise) and are protected, just like any other publications, by copyright laws and international treaties. However, the intellectual property extends only to the standard itself and not to its use. For instance if a company sells a device that is compliant with a given standard, it is not liable for further payment to the standards organization except in the special case when the organization holds patent rights or some other ownership of the intellectual property described in the standard.

It is, however, liable for any patent infringement by its implementation, just as with any other implementation of technology. The standards organizations give no guarantees that patents relevant to a given standard have been identified. ISO standards draw attention to this in the foreword with a statement like the following: "Attention is drawn to the possibility that some of the elements of this document may be the subject of patent rights. ISO and IEC shall not be held responsible for identifying any or all such patent rights". If the standards organization is aware that parts of a given standard fall under patent protection, it will often require the patent holder to agree to reasonable and non-discriminatory licensing before including it in the standard. Such an agreement is regarded as a legally binding contract, as in the 2012 case Microsoft v. Motorola.

== Trends ==
The accelerating pace of technological evolution is increasingly affecting how new standards are proposed, developed, and implemented.

=== Standards setting organizations ===
Since traditional, widely respected standards organizations tend to operate at a slower pace than technology evolves, many standards they develop are becoming less relevant because of the inability of their developers to keep abreast with the technological innovation. As a result, a new class of standards setters appeared on the standardization arena: the industry consortia or standards setting organizations (SSOs), which are also referred to as private standards. Despite having limited financial resources, some of them enjoy truly international acceptance. One example is the World Wide Web Consortium (W3C), whose standards for HTML, CSS, and XML are used universally. There are also community-driven associations such as the Internet Engineering Task Force (IETF), a worldwide network of volunteers who collaborate to set standards for internet protocols.

=== Informal standards ===
Some industry-driven standards development efforts don't even have a formal organizational structure. They are projects funded by large corporations. Among them are the OpenOffice.org, an Apache Software Foundation-sponsored international community of volunteers working on an open-standard software that aims to compete with Microsoft Office, and two commercial groups competing fiercely with each other to develop an industry-wide standard for high-density optical storage. Another example is the Global Food Safety Initiative where members of the Consumer Goods Forum define benchmarking requirements for harmonization and recognize scheme owners using private standards for food safety. Also, editors of Wikipedia follow their own self-imposed rules for editing.

=== Proposed legislation ===
The 118th and 119th U.S. Congress considered a bill to clarify copyright protection of standards called the Pro Codes Act. It aims to allow private copyright ownership of standards incorporated into law by reference. The bill would require limited, free public online access to standards, where they could be viewed, but not printed, downloaded or otherwise used.

== See also ==
- Harmonization (standards)
- International Organization for Standardization
- List of computer standards
- List of international common standards
- List of technical standard organizations
- Public.Resource.Org, non-profit corporation dedicated to publishing and sharing public domain materials
- Quality control
- Reasonable and non-discriminatory licensing
- Software standard
- Specification (technical standard)
- Standardization
- Technical standard
- Transport standards organisations
