= Ministry of Transport and Communications (Finland) =

Government ministry of Finland

- Finnish: liikenne- ja viestintäministeriö Swedish: kommunikationsministeriet

Ministry overview
- Formed: 13 September 1892
- Jurisdiction: Finnish Government
- Headquarters: Eteläesplanadi 16, Helsinki
- Annual budget: €3.363 billion (2018)
- Minister responsible: Lulu Ranne, Minister of Transport and Communications
- Ministry executive: Harri Pursiainen, Permanent Secretary
- Child agencies: FMI; Finnish Transport Agency; Trafi; FICORA; Finrail; Air Navigation Services Finland; Yle; Cinia

The Ministry of Transport and Communications (LVM, Finnish: liikenne- ja viestintäministeriö, Swedish: kommunikationsministeriet) is one of the twelve ministries which comprise the Finnish Government. LVM oversees Finland's transportation network and the country's communication services.

LVM's budget for 2018 is €3,362,555,000. The ministry employs 180 people.

== Key agencies and companies ==
Several agencies and state-owned companies operate under the Ministry of Transport and Communications, including:

- Finnish Transport Infrastructure Agency (Väylä)
- Finnish Transport and Communications Agency (Traficom)
- Finnish Meteorological Institute (Ilmatieteen laitos)
- VR Group
- Finavia
- Yle
- Trafi
- FICORA

== History ==
The ministry was founded in 1892 as a comitee before becoming the Ministry of Transport and Public Works. The ministry split into two, Ministry of Labour and the Ministry of Transport, the latter changing its name to Ministry of Transport and Communications in 2000.
