= CARICOM Regional Organisation for Standards and Quality =

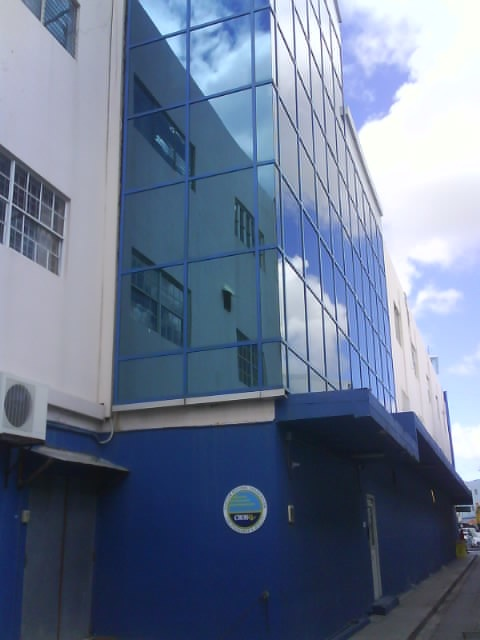
CROSQ (in Bridgetown)

The CARICOM Regional Organisation for Standards and Quality (CROSQ) is a regional standards body for the Caribbean Community CARICOM-bloc of countries formed by agreement in 2002 in Belize City, Belize. The body is presently headquartered in Bridgetown, Barbados. It replaced a prior regional institution known as the Caribbean Common Market Standards Council (CCMSC) formed in 1976.

== Partnering national bureaus ==
- Antigua and Barbuda – Antigua and Barbuda Bureau of Standards
- Barbados – Barbados National Standards Institution
- The Bahamas – Ministry of Lands and Local Government
- Belize – Belize Bureau of Standards
- Dominica – Dominica Bureau of Standards
- Guyana – Guyana National Bureau of Standards
- Grenada – Grenada Bureau of Standards
- Jamaica – Bureau of Standards Jamaica
- Montserrat – Ministry of Economic Development and Trade Department-Development Unit
- Saint Lucia – St. Lucia Bureau of Standards
- Saint Kitts and Nevis – St. Kitts and Nevis Bureau of Standards
- Saint Vincent and the Grenadines – St. Vincent and the Grenadines Bureau of Standards
- Suriname – Surinaams Standaarden Bureau
- Trinidad and Tobago – Trinidad and Tobago Bureau of Standards

== See also ==
- World Standards Day
- Bureau international des poids et mesures (BIPM)
- International Standards Organisation (ISO)
