= SSNB =

SSNB may refer to:

- Islamic Sultanate of Sulu and North Borneo (SSNB), see Moro National Liberation Front
- National Bureau of Statistics (NBS, ssnb.org), of South Sudan; see List of national and international statistical services

== See also ==
- SSN (hull classification symbol), a nuclear-powered general-purpose attack submarine
- SSBN (Ship, Submersible, Ballistic, Nuclear Powered), a type of ballistic missile submarine
- South Sudan National Bureau of Standards (SSNBS), a member of the Countries in the International Organization for Standardization
