= Sri Lanka Standards Institution =

- Abbreviation: SLSI
- Formation: 1964
- Type: government corporation
- Purpose: National standards
- Headquarters: Colombo
- Region served: Sri Lanka
- Official language: Sinhala
- Affiliations: ISO
- Website: www.slsi.lk

Sri Lanka Standards Institution also known as Sri Lanka Standards Institute (SLSI) is the National Standards Authority/Board of Sri Lanka as a subsidiary member of International Organization for Standardization was established in 1964 under the former Bureau of Ceylon Standards Act No. 38 of 1964. The institution later functioned under the new act of the Sri Lanka Standards Institution Act No. 6 of 1984 replacing the previous outdated act. The organisation works as a regulatory institution and it is a kind of state corporation on behalf of the government mainly to protect consumers from the unethical business trade malpractices. SLSI being the prominent National Standards Body in Sri Lanka is affiliated as a member to the International Organization for Standards since its inception in 1964. SLSI is currently under the administration of the Ministry of Science, Technology and Research. Governance of the SLSI is done by a Council appointed by the Minister of the said Ministry (Chrishantha Abeysena since 2024) per legislation.

== Motive ==
The institution implemented to establish national standards (SLS) and to protect the rights of consumers in Sri Lanka. It serves as one of the consumer oriented organisations in Sri Lanka along with Consumer Affairs Authority (CAA) and Central Environmental Authority (CEA).

=== Strategies ===
- Formulating National standards as required for the development of the national economy
- Promoting the use and application of national standards in all spheres of economic and social activity
- Promoting quality assurance in all sectors of the economy
- Providing consumer education and consumer protection
- Educating and training Industry and Service personnel on concepts, practices and techniques of Standardization and Quality management
- Providing test facilities and develop the national test capability

== Quality award ==
Sri Lanka Standards Institution implemented Sri Lanka National Quality Award which is an annual award provided to identify Sri Lankan organisations that exhibited superior performances in improving quality by maintaining quality management and quality achievement. It is organised and implemented by the Marketing and Promotion division of the Sri Lanka Standards Institution. Nestlé bagged the Sri Lanka National Quality Award from SLSI at the most recent 2017 Sri Lanka National Quality Awards ceremony.

=== Recent winners ===
- 2017 - Nestle Sri Lanka
- 2016 - AB securities
- 2015 - Maliban Biscuit Manufactories Limited
- 2014 - Sri Lanka Telecom
- 2013 - CEAT Kelani Holdings
