= Department of Standards Malaysia =

Logo for the Department of Standards Malaysia

The Department of Standards Malaysia (Standards Malaysia) is the National Standards Body and the National Accreditation Body, providing confidence to various stakeholders, through credible standardisation and accreditation services for global competitiveness. Governed by the Standard of Malaysia Act 1996 (Act 549), the Department of Standard Malaysia (Standards Malaysia) is an agency established on 28 August 1996 under the purview of Ministry of International Trade and Industry (MITI).

== History ==
- April 23, 1996 - Parliament of Malaysia passed the Standards of Malaysia Act 1996 (Act 549)
- August 28, 1996 - Establishment of Standards Malaysia through Standards of Malaysia Act 1996 (Act 549)
- September 1, 1996 - Standards Malaysia officially started its operation at 21st Floor, Wisma MBSA, Shah Alam, Selangor.
- September 3, 2001 - Standards Malaysia moved its operations from Shah Alam to the Federal Government Administrative Centre in Putrajaya.
- 2008 - Standards Malaysia moved its operation to Century Square, Cyberjaya.
- 5 April 2019 - Standards Malaysia moved to its own building at Tower 2, Menara Cyber Axis, Jalan Impact, Cyber 6, 63000 Cyberjaya, Selangor

== Director-General ==
- YBhg Dato' A Aziz Mat (1996 - 1999)
- YBrs Tn. Hj. Ir. Mah Lok Abdullah (March 2000 - September 2000)
- YBhg Dato' Mariani Mohammad (October 2000 - 29 September 2006)
- YBhg Datuk Fadilah Baharin (1 October 2006 - 31 January 2020)
- YBrs Tn. Hj. Shaharul Sadri Alwi (3 February 2020 - 12 Jun 2024)
- YBrs Mr. See Chee Kong (3 September 2025 - now)

== Function ==
=== National Standards Body ===
Develop and promote Malaysia Standard (MS)

As the National Standards Body, Standards Malaysia functions and roles are in line with the 11th Malaysia Plan.

=== National Accreditation Body ===
Accredit conformity assessment bodies consist of testing and calibration labs, inspection bodies and certification bodies.

As stipulated in the Act 549, the primary task of Standards Malaysia with respect to accreditation is to be responsible for the assessment and accreditation of conformity assessment bodies (CABs). CAB, as defined by the ISO/IEC 17011: Conformity assessment – Requirements for accreditation bodies accrediting conformity assessment bodies, is a body that performs conformity assessment services and that can be the object to or of accreditation, such as laboratories, certification bodies, inspection bodies, test facilities and proficiency testing providers. The Accreditation Division of Standards Malaysia carries out this specific task. Currently there are four accreditation schemes available, Skim Akreditasi Makmal Malaysia (SAMM), Scheme for the Accreditation of Certification Bodies (ACB), Malaysia Inspection Bodies Accreditation Scheme (MIBAS), Malaysia Proficiency Testing Provider Accreditation Scheme (MyPTP) and one compliance programme called Good Laboratory Practice Compliance Programme (GLP CP).

Malaysia, through Standards Malaysia has been accepted as a signatory to various regional and international arrangements. At the regional level Standards Malaysia is a signatory to the Asia Pacific Laboratory Accreditation Cooperation Mutual Recognition Arrangement (APLAC MRA) and Pacific Accreditation Cooperation Multilateral Recognition Arrangement (PAC MLA). As for at the international level, Standards Malaysia is a signatory to the International Laboratory Accreditation Cooperation Mutual Recognition Arrangement (ILAC MRA) and International Accreditation Forum Multilateral Recognition Arrangement (IAF MLA).

== Advisory Committees - Malaysian Standards and Accreditation Council (MSAC) ==
The main functions of the MSAC are:

- Subject to the direction and control of the Minister, the duties of the Council shall be to advise and submit recommendations for consideration and approval of the Minister relating to standardisation and accreditation based on Section 13 (3) Act 549.
- The council is responsible in ensuring continual implementation of activities required to accomplish duties and functions related to standardisation and accreditation and other relevant matters.
- Subject to Act 549 and any direction of the Minister, the Council may establish the rules for their own activities.

== Examples of MS standards ==
- MS 974 Specification for Rubber Swimming Fins
- MS 1722 Occupational Safety and Health Management Systems – Requirements

== See also ==
- Ministry of International Trade and Industry (Malaysia)
