= Finnish Transport Safety Agency =

Trafi Finnish Transport Safety Agency
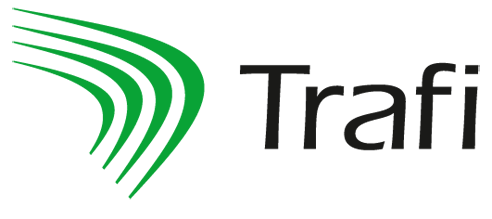

Agency overview
- Formed: 2010
- Preceding agencies: Finnish Civil Aviation Authority; Finnish Maritime Administration; Finnish Vehicle Administration
- Dissolved: 1 January 2019
- Superseding agency: Finnish Transport and Communications Agency
- Jurisdiction: Government of Finland
- Employees: 519
- Annual budget: 138 million EUR (2017)
- Parent department: Ministry of Transport and Communications
- Website: www.trafi.fi

The Finnish Transport Safety Agency (Finnish: Liikenteen turvallisuusvirasto, Swedish: Trafiksäkerhetsverket), shortened to Trafi, was a Finnish government agency responsible for the promotion of safety in the Finnish transport system. It was overseen by the Finland's Ministry of Transport and Communications. On 1 January 2019 it was merged with the Finnish Communications Regulatory Authority and parts of the Finnish Transport Agency to form the Finnish Transport and Communications Agency Traficom.

Trafi was created in 2010 through the merger of the Finnish Civil Aviation Authority, the Finnish Maritime Administration, and the Finnish Vehicle Administration. The agency's primary objective was to enhance the safety and environmental sustainability of Finland's transport systems, including air, sea, road, and rail. In 2019, Trafi merged with the Finnish Communications Regulatory Authority to form Traficom, a new agency responsible for regulating both transport and communications sectors in Finland.

== Responsibilities ==
1. Developing and implementing transport safety regulations and standards.
2. Issuing licenses, permits, and certificates for various transport activities and operators, including pilots, drivers, and ship captains.
3. Conducting inspections and audits to ensure compliance with transport safety regulations.
4. Investigating transport accidents and incidents to identify causes and develop recommendations for improving safety.
5. Promoting environmental sustainability and reducing emissions in the transport sector.
6. Conducting research and providing expert advice on transport safety matters.
