= Malta Standards Authority =

Maltese government agency

The Malta Standards Authority (MSA) is Malta's national standards body.

== Organization ==
The MSA is a government agency under the Office of the Prime Minister. The MSA consists of two divisions. The Legal Metrology Division is responsible for inspection and verification. The National Metrology Institute (MSA-NMS) is responsible for maintaining measurement standards for Malta.

== Metrology Institute ==
MSA-NMS is located at the Kordin Business Incubation Centre near Paola. As a national metrology institute, MSA-NMS is a member of EURAMET.

MSA-NMS has three goals.

- To provide a means of local knowledge transfer in the various measurement areas.
- To reduce the overall economic load for the acquisition of traceable measure in the same fields for all national stakeholders. In the medium to long term, MSA-NMS will be a net cost saver for Maltese stakeholders.
- To facilitate the fulfillment of traceable calibration requirements for laboratories intending to become accredited.

MSA-NMS maintains standards and is able to perform calibrations in the following measurement disciplines:

- Temperature
- Humidity
- Mass
- Dimension

== See also ==
- Malta
- Government of Malta
- List of technical standard organisations
