= IPQ =

IPQ or IPq may refer to:

- IPQ, label of South Korean boy band Omega X
- Instituto Portugues da Qualidade, a member body of the International Organization for Standardization
- Institute of Photonics und Quantum Electronics, 2018 Second Prize winner of the Berthold Leibinger Innovationspreis
- IPq, psychiatry Institute at the Hospital das Clínicas da Universidade de São Paulo, Brazil
- IPQ Entertainment, production company of 2023 South Korean television series A Shoulder to Cry On (TV series)
