= FICORA =

Former public authority in Finland

Finnish Communications Regulatory Authority FICORA
- Finnish: Viestintävirasto; Swedish: Kommunikationsverket

Agency overview
- Formed: 1988 (as THK); 2001 (as FICORA)
- Dissolved: 1 January 2019
- Superseding agency: Traficom
- Parent department: Ministry of Transport and Communications
- Website: www.viestintavirasto.fi/en/

The Finnish Communications Regulatory Authority, abbreviated to FICORA (Finnish: Viestintävirasto, Swedish: Kommunikationsverket), was the public authority responsible for communication regulations in Finland. FICORA regulated radio frequencies and television broadcast permits, supervised the operation of Internet service providers, and managed the .fi domain zone. FICORA was headquartered in Helsinki.

FICORA acted as the national telecommunications regulatory body, representing Finland in ITU and ETSI. It was one of the standards writing bodies working with the Finnish Standards Association. It was founded in 1988 as the State Agency for Telecommunications Administration (THK; Finnish: Telehallintokeskus, Swedish: Teleförvaltningscentralen) by combining the regulatory divisions of the Finnish PTT agency (fi) and that of Yleisradio (YLE) into a single agency, and adopted its name in 2001.

FICORA, the Finnish Transport Safety Agency (Trafi), and certain functions of the Finnish Transport Agency were merged to form the new Finnish Transport and Communications Agency (Traficom) on 1 January 2019.
