= National Standardization Agency =

- Badan Standardisasi Nasional
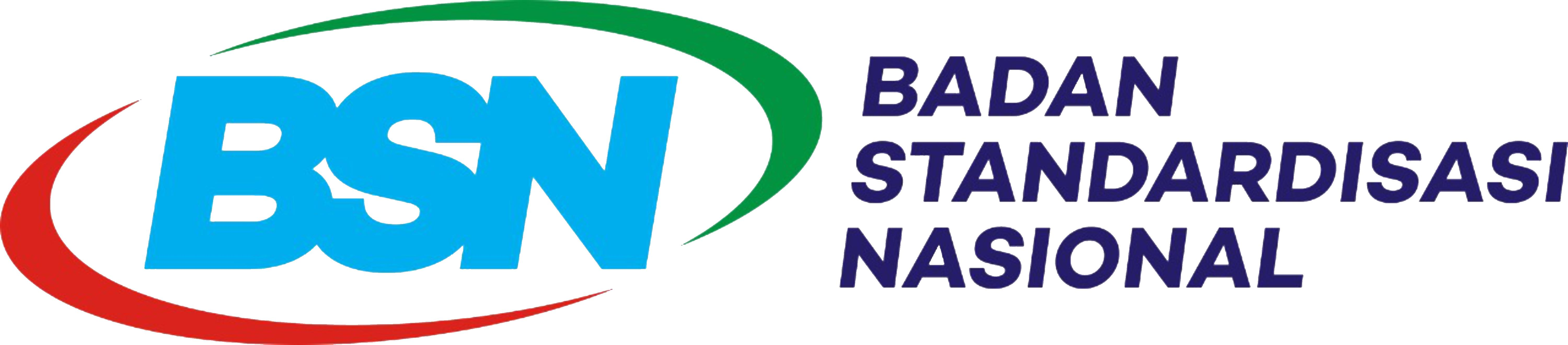

Agency overview
- Formed: March 27, 1997 (29 years ago)
- Jurisdiction: Indonesia
- Headquarters: BPPT I Building Floor 9-14; Jalan M.H. Thamrin 8, Kebon Sirih, Central Jakarta, Jakarta
- Website: www.bsn.go.id

The National Standardization Agency of Indonesia (Indonesian: Badan Standardisasi Nasional; BSN) is the International Organization for Standardization (ISO) member body for Indonesia. BSN is a non-ministerial Indonesian government agency with the main task of carrying out governmental tasks in the field of standardization and conformity assessment in Indonesia. The agency is also responsible to develop and maintain the Indonesian National Standard.

== Tasks ==
The following are the main tasks of BSN:

1. Facilitating stakeholders in developing and maintaining Indonesian National Standards, known as SNI (Standar Nasional Indonesia) in Indonesian. The process is carried out by the SNI Formulation Technical Committee consisting of representatives from producers, consumers, experts / universities, and the government. Determination of SNI is carried out by the Head of BSN through the Decree of the Head of BSN.
2. Actively involved in various International Organizations such as ISO, IEC, CAC, APEC, APLAC, ILAC, PAC, ASEAN, and so on. Active participation of BSN can be in the form of attending international standard formulation sessions in order to fight for the interests of Indonesia, as well as hosting the session / hosting.
3. As the secretariat of the National Accreditation Committee (KAN), which continues to develop accreditation and certification schemes and fight for mutual recognition internationally, allowing the results of certification and laboratory tests conducted by the Indonesian Conformity Assessment Agency to be recognized worldwide.
4. Encouraging the central government, regional governments, associations, industry, and universities to participate actively in developing and promoting SNI. The efforts of BSN to encourage stakeholders to jointly conduct standardization and conformity assessment activities, are formally formulated through the signing of the Cooperation Text (MOU).
5. Empowering business practitioners to implement SNI with various incentive and promotion programs as well as SNI Award for consistent and excellent business practitioners in applying SNI
6. Conducting research and testing of SNI products in the market, of which the results can be inputs for relevant Ministries that have the capacity to be market supervisors. The research activities conducted by BSN can also be included for SNI development and maintenance activities.
7. Providing standard information and sales services, both SNI and international standards
8. Organizing National Standards of Measurement Unit that enable metrological activities in Indonesia to be recognized by the world.

== Function ==
1. Assessment and formulation of national policies in the field of national standardization;
2. Coordination of functional activities in implementing BSN tasks;
3. Facilitating and fostering the activities of government agencies in the field of national standardization;
4. Carrying out domestic and international cooperation activities in the field of standardization, and;
5. Implementation of guidance and general administrative services in the fields of general planning, administration, organization and governance, staffing, finance, filing, coding, equipment and household.

== Authority ==
In carrying out these functions, BSN has the authority of:

1. Macro national planning in the field;
2. Formulation of policies in its field to support macro development;
3. Determination of information systems in their fields;
4. Other authorities in accordance with the provisions of the applicable laws and regulations, namely:
  1. formulation and implementation of certain policies in the field of national standardization;
  2. formulation and stipulation of accreditation system policy of certification bodies, inspection bodies and laboratories;
  3. stipulation of Indonesian National Standard (SNI);
  4. conducting research and development in its fields;
  5. organizing education and training in its fields.

== History ==
The establishment of BSN is closely related to the long history of standardization in Indonesia. The development and application of standards began during the Dutch and Japanese colonial periods and continued after Indonesia declared independence and became officially sovereign. Standardization was initially used to support colonial economic activities and ensure their smooth operation.

The official institution responsible for standardization activities began in 1928 in the Dutch East Indies, with the establishment of the Stichting Fonds voor de Normalisatie in Nederlands Indie (Normalization Foundation in the Indies) and the Normalization Road (Normalization Council) located in Bandung, Indonesia. Dutch engineers, who were mostly civil engineers, began to set standards for building materials, transportation equipment, and electrical installation standards, as well as requirements for external lines.

During World War II and the Japanese occupation (1942-1945), formal standardization activities were halted. However, on August 17, 1945, Indonesia proclaimed its independence. The country immediately formed a government and planned for development to improve the standard of living and welfare of the people, with the goal of achieving equality with other countries.

In 1951 the amendment to the "Raad Normalization" statute was formed and the Indonesian Normalization Fund Foundation (YDNI) was formed. In 1955 YDNI represented Indonesia as a member of the ISO international standards organization and in 1966 YDNI successfully represented Indonesia as a member of the International Electrotechnical Commission / IEC.

In the field of standardization Law No. 10 of 1961 known as the "Goods Act". It turns out that this law has not been able to be a means of managing overall standardization activities. At that time, standardization activities were still sectoral, carried out by various departments, including the Ministry of Industry (Indonesian Industrial Standards), the Ministry of Trade (Trade Standards), the Ministry of Public Works (Indonesian Construction and Building Standards), the Ministry of Agriculture (Indonesian-Agriculture Agricultural Standards; Indonesian Agricultural Standards-Animal Husbandry), Ministry of Forestry (Indonesian Forestry Standards), as well as several government institutions / agencies.

The government began to place standardization as a strategic function in supporting national development. In 1973, the "National System Development for Standardization" program was established as a priority. In 1976, the National Standardization System Preparation Committee was formed. In 1984, with the Decree of the President of the Republic of Indonesia the National Standardization Board (DSN) was formed with the main task of establishing standardization policies, coordinating and fostering cooperation in the field of national standardization. The Chairperson of the National Standardization Board is held by the State Minister for Research and Technology, Prof. Dr. Ing. H. Bacharuddin Jusuf Habibie, FREng.

Through the struggle of the previous leadership, Alm. Ir. Herudi Kartowisastro, on March 27, 1997, the government dissolved the DSN which subsequently changed to the National Standardization Body. BSN itself is a Non-Ministry Government Institution (LPNK) that is given the task by the government to foster and coordinate all standardization and conformity assessment activities in Indonesia. The establishment of BSN was based on Presidential Decree No. 13 of 1997 perfected by Presidential Decree No. 166 of 2000 concerning Position, Duties, Functions, Authority, Organizational Structure and Work Procedures of Non-Departmental Government Institutions as amended several times, and the most recent by Presidential Decree No. 4 of 2018, concerning the National Standardization Agency.

In order to enhance the development of the Indonesian National Standard (SNI), the government established Government Regulation No. 102 of 2000 concerning National Standardization. On September 14, 2014, Law No. 20 of 2014 concerning Standardization and Conformity Assessment was stipulated. With the existence of this Law, the government will further strengthen the existence and role of BSN in the development process in Indonesia both in the context of physical development, efficient management of natural resources, and the development of highly competitive Indonesian people. Welcoming the era of globalization which demands high competitiveness, as well as the implementation of Law No. 20 of 2014, the BSN successfully reorganized itself to include a new structure namely the Deputy for the National Standard Measuring Unit (SNSU) in 2018. With the Deputy, BSN was more able to optimally implement the quality infrastructure (Standardization, Conformity Assessment, Metrology) in order to actualize a system that allows products to meet the quality and requirements of Safety, Security, Health, and Environmental Sustainability (K3L); life can be more comfortable, safe and orderly; the dignity of the nation will be lifted because Indonesia can compete more internationally.

== Organization ==
The National Standardization Agency Organization consists of the Chairman, Main Secretariat, Deputy for Standards Development, Deputy for Application of Standards and Conformity Assessment, Deputy for Accreditation, Deputy for National Standards for Measuring Units, Inspectorates, Research and Development Center for Human Resources, and Data and Systems Center Information. The chairman of BSN is under and directly responsible to the President of Indonesia.
