= Algerian Institute of Standardization =

Standards organization based in Algeria

Algerian Institute of Standardization المعهد الجزائري للتقييس
- المعهد الجزائري للتقييس
- Abbreviation: ANSI
- Type: ...
- Legal status: ...
- Purpose: National standards
- Headquarters: Algiers
- Official language: English, Arabic
- Website: www.ianor.dz

The Algerian Institute of Standardization (Arabic: المعهد الجزائري للتقييس) (AIOS-IANOR), was erected in a public industrial and commercial fields (EPIC) by Executive Decree No. 98-69 of February 21, 1998, as part of restructuring INAPI (Algerian Institute of Standardization and Industrial Property).

== See also ==
- ASCII
- Fortran
- ANSI C
- ANSI ASC X9
- ANSI ASC X12
- ANSI escape code
- ANSI-SPARC Architecture
- Institute of Nuclear Materials Management (INMM)
- National Institute of Standards and Technology (NIST)
- Institute of Environmental Sciences and Technology (IEST)
- Accredited Crane Operator Certification
- Open standards
