= General Directorate of Standards =

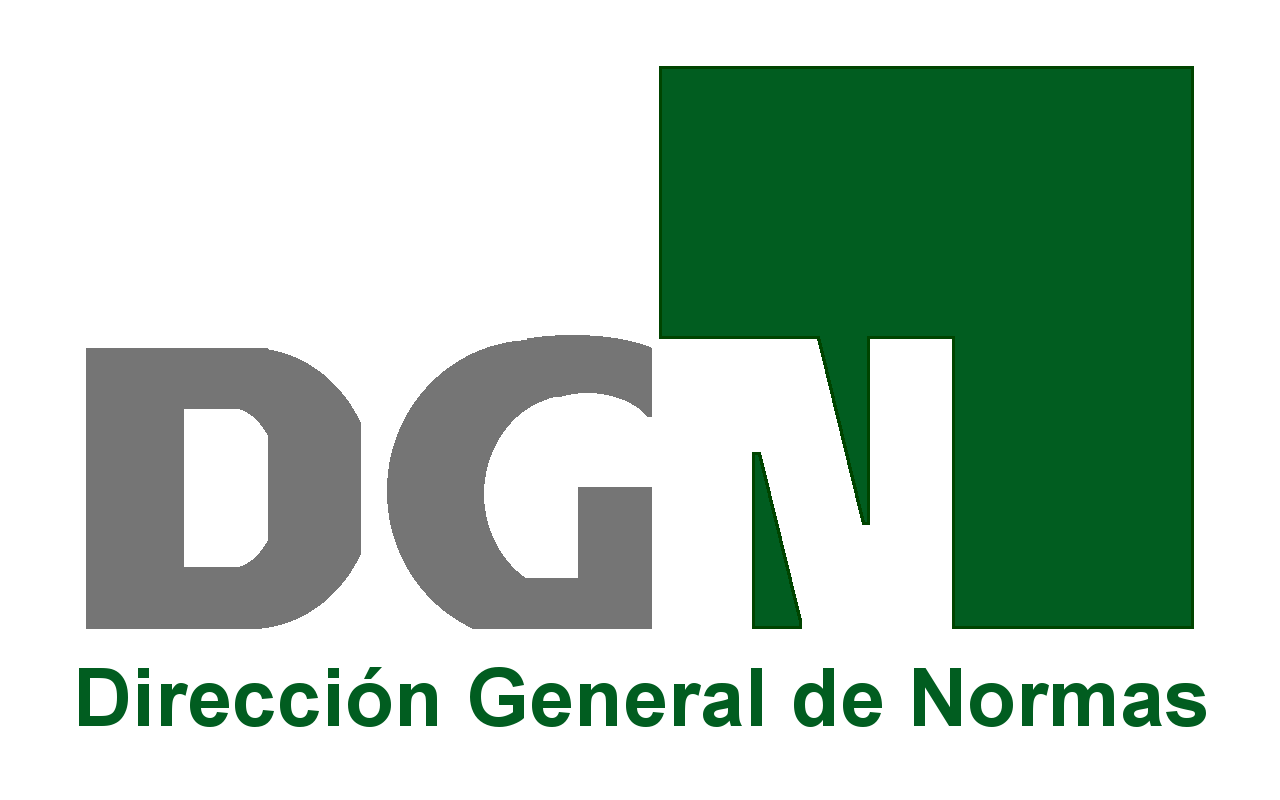
- Headquarters: Cuauhtémoc, Mexico City
- Website: https://www.sinec.gob.mx/SINEC/

The Dirección General de Normas (General Directorate of Standards) is an administrative unit under the Normativity, Competitiveness, and Competition Unit of the Secretariat of Economy in Mexico. It is responsible for exercising the powers conferred by the Federal Law on Metrology and Standardization (repealed), the Law on Quality Infrastructure, the Federal Law on Consumer Protection, the Hydrocarbons Law, the Federal Law on Telecommunications and Broadcasting, as well as the regulations and other applicable provisions in the field of standardization, metrology, and conformity assessment, including international agreements and treaties in that regard.

Therefore, it establishes through the mandatory Mexican Official Standards (NOM), the minimum quality standards for products and services offered to the population. Through the voluntary Mexican Standards (NMX), it determines the quality of specific products and services, particularly for the protection and guidance of consumers. These standards must not contain specifications lower than those established in the Mexican Official Standards.

In Mexico, the mandatory Mexican Official Standards (NOM) are developed by Federal Government Agencies according to their attributions through the Consultative Committees for National Standardization, and they are of public nature.

On the other hand, the voluntary Mexican Standards (NMX) are promoted by the private sector through the National Standardization Organizations according to their competence. For areas not covered by these organizations, the standards are developed and promoted by the Secretariat of Economy through its National Technical Standardization Committees.

To ensure maximum efficiency in standardization matters, the Secretariat of Economy participates in international forums and organizations such as the Codex Alimentarius, the Pan American Standards Commission (COPANT), the International Electrotechnical Commission (IEC), and the International Organization for Standardization (ISO).
