= Trinidad and Tobago Bureau of Standards =

Trinidad and Tobago standards organization

- Logo of the TTBS

Department overview
- Formed: July 8, 1974
- Jurisdiction: Government of Trinidad and Tobago
- Headquarters: 1-2 Century Drive, Trincity Industrial Estate, Macoya, Tunapuna, Trinidad and Tobago
- Department executive: Jose Edwardo Trejo, Executive Director
- Parent department: Ministry of Trade and Industry
- Website: gottbs.com

The Trinidad and Tobago Bureau of Standards (TTBS) the International Organization for Standards member body of Trinidad and Tobago. Founded on July 8, 1974, the organization is responsible for establishing and maintaining the quality of all goods in the country, excluding medicine, food, and cosmetics, which are the responsibility of the Chemistry, Food and Drug Division of the Ministry of Health. Where possible, the TTBS will adopt international standards. The TTBS operates under the Standards Act No. 18 of 1997. It is a subordinate body within the Ministry of Trade and Industry. The TTBS is led by an executive director and a board of between nine and fifteen members. The members must have experience or qualifications in relevant fields (i.e. standards or business). The current executive director of the organization is Jose Edwardo Trejo.

In November 2022, the TTBS launched the Energy Efficient Lighting Lab (EEL Lab), which was tasked by Minister of Trade and Industry Paula Gopee-Scoon with providing testing services for lighting products while also raising awareness of energy efficiency.
