= Finnish Transport and Communications Agency =

Finnish government agency

- Liikenne- ja viestintävirasto (Finnish), Transport- och kommunikationsverket (Swedish)

Agency overview
- Formed: 1 January 2019
- Preceding agencies: FICORA; Finnish Transport Safety Agency
- Jurisdiction: Government of Finland
- Employees: 900
- Annual budget: 258 million EUR (2022)
- Website: www.traficom.fi

The Finnish Transport and Communications Agency (Finnish: Liikenne- ja viestintävirasto, Swedish: Transport- och kommunikationsverket), shortened to TRAFICOM, is a Finnish government agency dealing with transport and communication in Finland.

The agency expected to employ 900 people across 15 branches in Finland. The main office is located in Helsinki.
