= The Belize Bureau of Standards =

Belize Bureau of Standards

Agency overview
- Formed: 1997; 29 years ago
- Jurisdiction: Standards organization
- Headquarters: 763C+G6Z, Belmopan, Belize; 17.2536086°N 88.7793155°W
- Parent department: Ministry of Economic Development, Petroleum, Investment, Trade and Commerce
- Website: bbs.gov.bz

The Belize Bureau of Standards is a government of Belize department that develops, promotes and implements standards for goods, services and processes.

Established in 1992, the Bureau is under the Ministry of Economic Development, Petroleum, Investment, Trade and Commerce.

== History ==
The Bureau was established under the Standards Act Chapter 295 of the substantive Law of Belize revised edition 2000-2003. Its goal is to develop, promote and implement standards associated with goods, services and processes within Belize. Three other units makes up the department; namely, Supplies Control, Consumer Protection and Metrology Units. With these units operating under the department there are additional responsibilities.

The Supplies Control Unit is responsible for managing both import and export licenses and price controlled regulated goods. Under the Metrology Units, the department is responsible for the verification of weighing and measuring instruments use for trade within Belize. Lastly, the department has the responsibility of ensuring the health, safety and life of the Belizean population under the Consumer Protection Unit. This unit is currently operating without establish legislated framework hence enforcement is a challenge in carrying out this mandate.

Before October 2015, the Bureau was under the Ministry of Trade, Investment Promotion, Private Sector Development and Consumer Protect. The department worked closely with the ministry as a stakeholder in trade negotiation and other closely related mandates.

== Additional information ==
Some key legislation that this department to carry out its mandates are:

- Government policies
- National Metrology Act
- Standards Act
- Supplies Control Act
- Consumer Protection Bill Draft
- Standard Advisory Council [SAC] policies, and
- The World Trade Organization Technical Barrier to Trade Agreement [WTO/TBT]

The Belize Bureau of Standards collaborates with the following organization:

- The CARICOM Regional Organization for Standards and Quality [CROSQ]
- The World Trade Organization Technical Barrier to Trade Agreement [WTO/TBT]
- Beltraide

== See also ==
- Codex Alimentarius
