= Finnish Standards Association =

The Finnish Standards (SFS Suomen Standardit rt, Finnish: Suomen Standardisoimisliitto SFS ry, Swedish: Finlands Standardiseringsförbund) is the central standards organization in Finland. It is a member organization of the ISO and CEN, representing Finland in these organizations. SFS is responsible for both international and national standards, with the former being translated from ISO standards. The organization acts as a central organization for 13 different national standards writing bodies, such as SESKO and FICORA.
