= Malaysian Standard 1722:2011 =

MS 1722:2011 – Occupational Safety and Health Management Systems – Requirements (FIRST REVISION) is a Malaysian Standard that provides requirements on Occupational Safety and Health Management Systems (OSHMS) and basis for the development OSH systems in an organisation. The MS 1722 standard enable an organization to manage its OHS risks and improve its OHS performance. The requirements of the standard are intended to address OHS for employees, temporary employees, contractors and other personnel on site rather than the safety of products and services. The standards provide a more effective method of protecting employees and others from workplace injuries and illnesses and demonstrate management commitment in meeting OHS requirements.

== Introduction ==
The basic principles used in MS is POPEA which consists of five main elements in the system. The elements are policy, organizing, planning and implementation, evaluation and action for improvement:

1. Policy – include activities related to the development of the organization's OSH policy statement and structures and practices that insure active and meaningful worker participation in OSH arrangement.
2. Organizing – focuses on the establishment of OSH responsibilities and accountabilities structures, a training system, competency definitions, documentation practices and a communication system.
3. Planning and implementation – addresses the activities associated with the fulfilment of the principles expressed in the OSH policy statement. These activities include the initial assessment of the OSH arrangement that then support the actual system planning, development and implementation functions.
4. Evaluation – describes those functions associated with measuring the management system's performance which involves the development of performance monitoring and measurement protocols, investigation practices for accidents, auditing methods and management review arrangement.
5. Action for Improvement – addresses issues associated with preventive/corrective actions and continual improvement. Investigations, audits, and management review, appropriate prevention/corrective and continual improvement actions can be taken with the information obtained from performance monitoring and measurement.

== Evaluation ==
Evaluation is the fourth important elements in the MS 1722:2011. It involves Performance Monitoring and Measurement, Incident Investigation, Audit and Management Review. This part is where the organisations are able to evaluate their performance in implementing the OSH management system and show the commitment of the employer towards the continual improvement of the organisations by complying with legal requirement.

=== Performance monitoring and measurement ===
Performance monitoring and measurement is a measureable results of an organisation's management of its occupational management system (OSH) risks. OSH performance measurement includes measuring the effectiveness of the organisation's controls. In the context of OSHMS, results can also be measured against the organisation's OSH policy, OSH objectives, and other OSH performance requirements.

Performance monitoring and measurement should be used as a means of determining the extent to which OSH policy and objectives are being implemented and risks are controlled, include both active and reactive monitoring and not be based only upon near misses, work-related fatalities, injuries, ill health, diseases, disabilities statistics and must be recorded.

Active monitoring should contain the elements necessary to have a proactive system and should include monitoring of the achievement of specific plans, established performance criteria and objectives, the systematic inspection of work systems, premises, plant and equipment. The monitoring also should include surveillance of the working environment, surveillance of employees' health, where appropriate, through suitable medical monitoring or follow-up of employees for early detection of signs and symptoms of harm to health in order to determine the effectiveness of prevention and control measures, and compliance with applicable national laws and regulations, collective agreements and other commitments on OSH to which the organisation subscribes.

While for reactive monitoring should include the identification, reporting and investigation of work-related fatalities, injuries, disabilities, ill health including monitoring of aggregate sickness absence records, diseases and near misses, other losses, such as damage to property, deficient safety and health performance, and OSHMS failures and employees' rehabilitation and health-restoration programmes. The organization should establish qualitative measurement which has no numerical value or quantitative measurement which has numerical value.

=== Incident Investigation ===
Incident is where any work-related event(s) in which an injury or ill-health (regardless of severity) or fatality or damage to property or could have occurred

Investigation is the action of investigating something or someone; formal or systematic examination or research.

Incident investigation provides employers and employees the opportunity to identify hazards in their operations and shortcomings in their safety and health programs where it enables employers and employees to identify and implement the corrective actions necessary to prevent future incidents.

Based on MS, all organisations should establish, implement and maintain procedures to notify, investigate record, analyse and document all OSH related incidents.

All work-related incidents shall be notified to relevant authorities in accordance to national laws for it to be investigated by the organisation. As stated in the Occupational Safety and Health (Notification of Accident, Dangerous Occurrence, Occupational Poisoning and Occupational Disease) Regulations 2004, Regulation 5, where the employer or self-employed is responsible to notify accidents, dangerous occurrence, occupational poisoning and occupational disease to Director General of the nearest Department of Occupational Safety and Health office as per required.

Those who are going to carry out the investigations shall be competent. Participation from employees and its representatives are encouraged for the benefits of the investigation. No person shall, unless authorized to do so, remove or in any way interfere with or disturb any plant, substance, article or thing related to the incident except for certain purposes.

The investigation must be carried out as soon as possible and the full report must be documented and where applicable reported to the relevant authorities which are Director General of the nearest Department of Occupational Safety and Health office within the required time frame stated in national law.

The results of the investigation shall be communicated to appropriate persons such safety and health committee, if exists and come out with appropriate recommendations. If there is no safety and health committee, the employer are responsible to take the necessary action(s).

If there are reports produced by external investigative authorities or agencies, it shall be acted upon in the same way as internal investigation and the issues must be keeping as confidential.

All investigation reports and related action(s) taken must be recorded, documented, maintained and included in the management review and considered for continual improvement.

=== Audit ===
A systematic, independent and documented process for obtaining evidence and evaluating it objectively to determine the extent to which the defined criteria are fulfilled. Independent does not necessarily mean external to the organization. In many cases, particularly in smaller organizations, independence can be demonstrated by the freedom from responsibility for the activity being audited.

The objective of audit is to determine whether the OSHMS and its elements are in place, adequate, and effective in protecting the safety and health of employees and preventing incidents in the organisation. The audit should identify the audit objectives, criteria and cover all areas and activities within the scope of the OSHMS.

An audit programme should be planned, established, implemented and maintained by the organisation, based on the results of risk assessments of the organisation's activities and the results of previous audits. Audits should be conducted by competent persons, internal or external to the organisation that is independent of the activity being audited. The OSHMS audit process consists of series of well planned phases. Each phase is intended to achieve certain objectives and is dependent on the results of the preceding phase. The OSHMS audit phases can be divided into before audit, during (site) audit, after audit and conducting audit follow up.

The audit findings and conclusions should be submitted to the management or appropriate and responsible committee who would deliberate on the findings. The necessary recommendations should be communicated to all relevant parties as soon as possible, that are responsible for preventive and corrective actions to be taken.

=== Management Review ===
Management review is conducted to ensure the suitability, adequacy and effectiveness of the OSH management system in the organisation to meet the needs and conditions of the organisation. It should be carried out by the Top Management which is employer and senior management regularly. It can be held frequently if needed as different review may address different elements of the overall management review.

The findings of the management reviews of the OSH management system have been recorded, documented and communicated to relevant persons such as employer, safety and health committee, its representative or other person who are appropriate. So, any necessary action can be taken to improve the OSH management systems in the organisation.

== Organizing ==
The second element of OSHMS is organizing which consists of element of establishment of OSH responsibilities, accountabilities, structures, a training system, competency definition, documentation practices and communication system.

=== Responsibility, Accountability and Authority ===
According to MS 1722:2011 – Occupational Safety and Health Management System – Requirement (First Revision), the involved clauses are as follows:

3.2.1.1 The employer shall have overall responsibility for the protection of employees’ safety and health and provide leadership for OSH activities in the organization.

3.2.1.2 The employer shall allocate responsibility, accountability and authority for the development, implementation and performance of OSHMS and achievement of the relevant OSH objectives

3.2.1.3 The responsibilities and accountabilities of all personnel on OSH shall be clearly defined, documented and communicated to respective personnel.

3.2.1.4 The employer shall be provided appropriate resources to ensure that persons responsible for OSH can perform their functions effectively.

3.2.1.5 A person(s) at the senior management level shall be appointed as OSH management representative(s), with responsibility, accountability and authority for:

- the development, implementation, periodic review and evaluation of OSHMS;
- periodic reporting to the top management on the performance of the OSHMS; and
- promoting the participation of all members of the organization.

Based on the Guidelines of Occupational Safety and Health Management System 2011, the responsibility, accountability and authority are referred as the matters as follows;

- The role, responsibility, accountability and authority of all employees who perform duties that are part of the OSHMS shall be clearly defined, documented and communicated to respective employees. These can be described in job descriptions, manuals and procedures.
- The executive ownership and accountability of OSH performance is a critical feature, where the employer is held directly accountable for each aspect of the OSH programmed, e.g., anticipation, recognition, evaluation, and control of OSH hazards.

=== Communication ===
According to MS 1722:2011 – Occupational Safety and Health Management System – Requirement (First Revision), the involved clauses are as follows:

3.2.4.1 Arrangement shall be established and maintained for:

- Receiving, documenting and responding appropriately to internal and external communications related to OSH;
- Ensuring the internal communication of OSH information between relevant levels and functions of the organisation shall also cover contractors, vendors and visitors; and
- Ensuring that the concerns, ideas and inputs of employees and their representatives on OSH matters are received, considered and responded to.

Based on the Guidelines of Occupational Safety and Health Management System 2011, the OSHMS are referred as the matters follows:

The organisation should have a mechanism in place for receiving, documentation and responding to relevant communication from external interested parties such as neighbouring community and authorities.

The employer should set up a communication system to draft, update and disseminate OSH related information across the organisation. Communication system includes all communications channels whether verbal, written or electronic communication. Communication can be in the form such as:

- OSH briefings for employees and other interested parties,
- Notice boards containing OSH performance data, news letter, poster, etc.
- Providing coaching session(s) and demonstrations
- Organisation's booklets
- Sending memos
- Intranet/internet

In order for the communication to be effective, processes of information flow need to be established and relevant workers need to be trained. The organisation should ensure that the content and methods of OSH related communications are timely, useful and easily understood by the intended recipients. The employer also should set up and maintain communication system to disseminate OSH related information across the organisation.

=== Competence, Training and Awareness ===
According to MS 1722:2011 – Occupational Safety and Health Management System – Requirement (First Revision), the involved clauses are as follows:

- 3.2.2.1 OSH competence requirements, unless defined by authorities, shall be defined by the employer. Arrangements shall be established and maintained to ensure that all persons are competent to carry out the safety and health aspects of their duties and responsibilities.
- 3.2.2.2 The employer shall have, or shall have access to sufficient OSH competence to implement the OSHM.
- 3.2.2.3 The employer shall be identify training needs and conduct training programmes for all members of the organisation to effectively implement OSHMS. Training records shall be established and maintained.

Based on the Guidelines of Occupational Safety and Health Management System 2011, the competence, training and awareness are referred as the matters follows;

All employees should possess the necessary mental skills (e.g. knowledge capability), physical preparation, and knowledge to work safely. Management and employees should demonstrate competence to safely conduct or supervise work. This competence can be acquired through a combination of education, certification(s), experience, and workplace training. When necessary the organisation could engage competent consultant (s) from external sources.

The organisation should give specific consideration to the competency requirement for those person(s) who will be:

- the management representative
- performing hazard identification risk assessment and risk control (HIRARC)
- performing exposure assessment
- performing audit
- performing behavioural observation
- performing incident investigation
- performing high risk task
- others who may require competency in carrying out their work safely.

Training requirements, procedures and arrangements should be appropriate to the organization's OSH hazards/risks. Through proper and adequate training, managers, supervisors and workers will be able to manage worksite hazards. Regardless of the size of the organization, training should be used as a tool to prevent workplace accidents and possible injuries and illnesses. Up-to-date training records should be kept for legal purposes, and as references for future competency training needs and decision making.

There are some approaches that can be followed such as follows;

Step 1: Determine what training your organization need or prepare OSH Training matrix

The OSH Training matrix is a tool which can be used to assist employers and supervisors to identify what OSH training are required for their workers. The matrix aims to compile a list of OSH training modules necessary to equip workers with the skills, knowledge and information to effectively manage hazard exposures during their working day.

Step 2: Prepare your training plan

Prepare training plan by prioritising the training modules and develop a training schedule for the organization. It is recommended that the legislation and hazard management training modules are delivered first. The other modules listed within the OSH Training matrix can be delivered in an order appropriate to the worker‟s need.

Step 3: Deliver the training

Once the plan is developed, train the workers in accordance with the training plan and schedule. You may require developing your training modules for the topics covered within the workers specific elements. You must ensure that the information is easy to understand and try using variety of training methods to deliver your massage. Also, ensure that the trainer has enough time to prepare their resources and venue. Competency training should be conducted by competent person. Record the training particular (e.g. name and date) on the training form when training has been completed. Maintain the training records on file in a hard copy form or electronically.

Step 4: Evaluation of training

Check whether the training has worked or not. To make sure that the training program is accomplishing its goals, an evaluation of the training can be valuable. Training should have as one of its critical components, a method of measuring the effectiveness of the training. A plan for evaluating the training session(s), either written or thought-out by the employer, should be developed when the course objectives and content are developed. It should not be delayed until the training has been completed. Evaluation will help employers or supervisors determine the amount of learning achieved and whether an employee‟s performance has improved on the job.

=== OSHMS Documentation ===
According to MS 1722:2011 – Occupational Safety and Health Management System – Requirement (First Revision), the involved clauses are as follows:

3.2.3.1 OSHMS documentation shall be established and maintained. The documentation shall include:

- The OSH policy and objective of the organisation;
- The allocated key OSH management roles and responsibilities for the implementation of the OSHMS;
- The significant hazard/risk arising from the organisation's activities and the arrangements for their prevention and control; and
- Procedures, instructions or other internal documents used within the framework of the OSHMS.

3.2.3.3 The OSHMS documentation shall be:

- Clearly written and presented in a way that is understood by those who have to use it;
- Periodically reviewed, revised as necessary, communicated and readily accessible to all appropriate or affected members of the organisation; and
- Disposed off or removed from circulation when obsolete in accordance to procedure

3.2.3.3 OSH records shall be established and maintained according to the needs of the organisation. They shall be identified, traceable, retrieved and their retention times shall be specified.
