= AENOR =

Spanish Association for Standardization and Certification
- Asociación Española de Normalización y Certificación
- Abbreviation: AENOR
- Formation: 26 February 1986
- Purpose: National standardization
- Headquarters: Madrid, Spain
- Official language: Spanish
- Staff: 581
- Website: http://www.aenor.es/

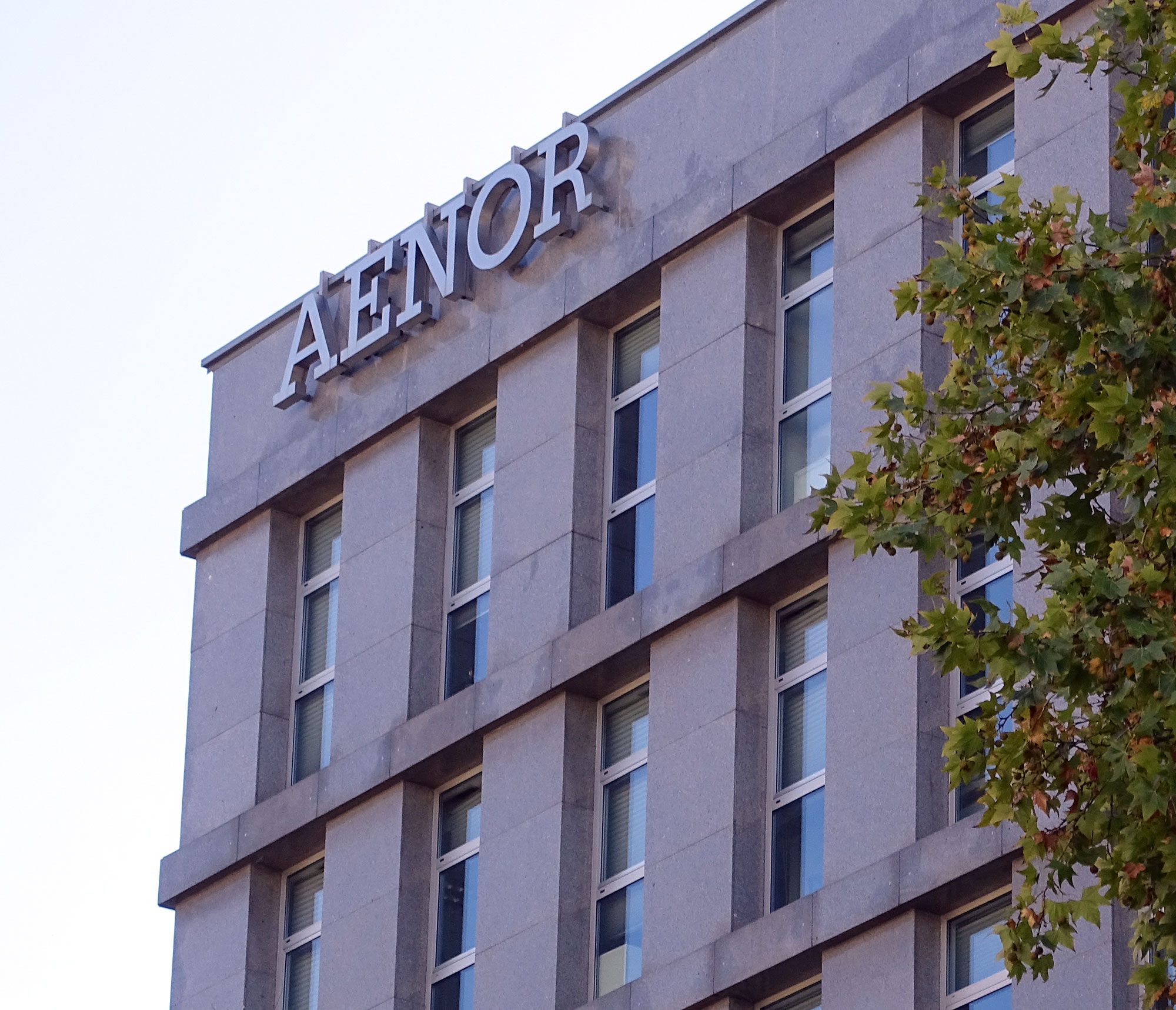
AENOR

The Spanish Association for Standardization and Certification (AENOR, Spanish: Asociación Española de Normalización y Certificación) is an entity dedicated to the development of Standardization and Certification in all Spanish industrial and service sectors.

== Description ==
Aenor is a private, independent, non-profit-making (although they charge to access their standards) Spanish institution which contributes through standardization and certification to improve technology produced by companies. It was created by order of the Ministry of Industry and Energy on 26 February 1986, in accordance with the Royal Decree 1614/1985 and was recognized as a standardization organization and as an entity of certification by Royal decree 2200/1995, following the law 21/1992 of industry.

== Functions ==
The functions of AENOR are:

1. Standardization: AENOR is the organization legally responsible of development and diffusion of technical standards in Spain.
2. Certification: AENOR certificates are one of the most valued in the international ambit, since it has emitted certificates in over 60 countries. Therefore, AENOR is situated between the ten most important certificatory in the world.
3. Publishment Activity: It offers a wide catalog of technical books, ebooks and magazines among others.
4. Software Design: AENOR designed Ceertol, which is family of computing solutions for the management of systems.
5. Training in different areas:

- Quality control
- Food quality and security
- Environmental Management
- Social responsibility and sustainable development
- Energy and climate change
- Security and health at work
- Information technology
- Human resources and training.

6. Information services: they provide general information about the following issues:

- UNE (Spanish: Una Norma Española; English: one spanish standard) standards and others national, european and international regulations documents.
- Systems, processes, applicable standards and AENOR certification marks, for products, services, quality systems, prevention of occupational risks, among others.
- Spanish legislation related to standardization activities.
- Commercial information on the different publications and services of AENOR.
- Information on current certifications.

== History ==
Coinciding with the incorporation of Spain to the European Economic Community, in 1986 AENOR was constituted. Until that date, standardization work was the responsibility of the Institute for Rationalization and Standardization (IRANOR).

=== First steps in standardization ===
In the first year 24 technical standards committees were created. A year later, AENOR assumed the representation of Spain before the European organizations (CENELEC, ETSI) and international (ISO, IEC).

Nowadays, AENOR has more than 200 technical standards committees involving nearly 6,000 experts in the field.

=== Milestones ===
-	Milestones
1986	Creation of AENOR
1987	First standard UNE edited
1988	First Brand N product certificate
1989	First quality of service certificate
1990	First International Cooperation project
1992	Creation of the Training Center
1993	Opening of the first delegation in Basque Country and the AENOR Agency in Andalusia
1995	First Certificate of Environmental Management System
1996	AENOR, The first Spanish entity accredited by the National Entity of Accreditation (ENAC)
1997	Opening of AENORMexico
1999	Opening of CEIS (Center for Testing, Innovation and Services)
2001	Opening of AENORinternational
2002	First Certificate of Management Systems en I+D
2004	First Certificate of Management Systems in Occupational Health and Safety
2005	Accreditation for the UN as Designated Operational Entity –Kyoto protocol. It was the first Spanish entity achieving it
2008	Opening of AENORlaboratory
2009	Opening of the last delegation in Castilla-La Mancha. AENOR is now present in the 17 Autonomous Communities
2010	Opening of offices in Ecuador, Dominican Republic and Morocco

== Members ==
Any entity that has interest in the develop of the standardization or certification can be member of AENOR, because of its associative character. Today, It has more than 800 members, among them are the main business associations, some of the first Spanish companies and a good representation of Public Administrations.

=== Categories ===
- Individual :Physical people
- Corporate members :business organizations and associations of customers of statal ambit.
- Members: Companies and institutions.
- Honor Members : Natural or legal persons who receive this consideration in recognition of the service of the purposes of the Association.

=== Governing bodies ===
1. All Governing Bodies are called and chaired by the President.
2. The General Assembly is the supreme body in which all members participate. Its function is to elect the Board of Directors, which is responsible for the representation and management of the Association.
3. The Board of Directors consists of a maximum of 70 members representing the different classes of members and the interested parties, who then elect the Permanent Commission.
4. The Standing Committee is composed of 10 members and is responsible for supervising and controlling the guidelines established by the Board of Directors.

== Participation in international and regional standardization bodies ==
AENOR is a Spanish member of the following international standardization organizations:

- International Organization for Standardization (ISO);
- International Electrotechnical Commission (IEC).

Likewise, at European level, AENOR is a Spanish member of the following recognized standardization organizations:

- European Committee for Standardization (CEN);
- European Committee for Electrotechnical Standardization (CENELEC).

AENOR is the official Spanish national standardization organization according to (ETSI).

== See also ==
- Standardization
- International Organization for Standardization (ISO)
  - Countries in the International Organization for Standardization
- European Committee for Standardization (CEN)
- European Committee for Electrotechnical Standardization (CENELEC)
- International Accreditation Forum (IAF)
