= Swiss Association for Standardization =

The Swiss Association for Standardization (SNV, German: Schweizerische Normen-Vereinigung, French: Association Suisse de Normalisation) is in charge of Switzerland's international cooperation and acceptance in the field of standardization. It is a founding member of both ISO and CEN.

The Swiss Association for Standardization liaises between experts of standardization and users of standards.
