= African Organization for Standardisation =

African intergovernmental organization

Logo

The African Organization for Standardisation (ARSO), formerly the African Regional Organisation for Standardisation, is an intergovernmental organization of 43 countries of Africa. It also led the continental program Eco Mark Africa.

== History ==
It was formed by United Nations Economic Commission for Africa and Organisation of African Unity in August 17, 1977 at Accra, Ghana, with 21 African governments.

== Purpose ==
The purpose of the organization is to facilitate trade between countries of Africa and other countries of the world and to maintain a framework for production of cocoa beans.

== Member Countries ==
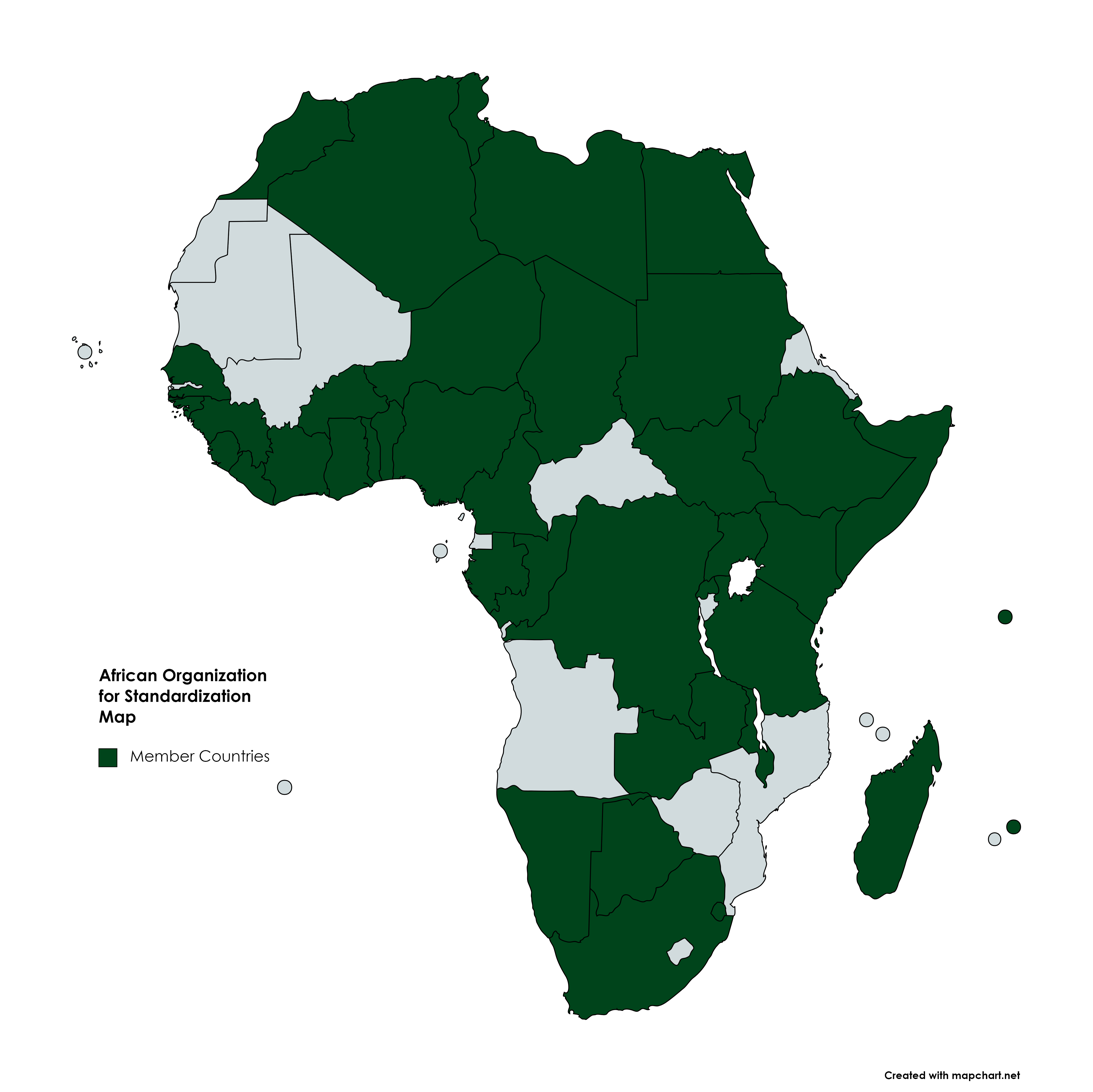
African Organization for Standardisation map

The 42 members of the African Organization for Standardisation are:

- Algeria
- Benin
- Burkina Faso
- Cameroon
- Chad
- Côte d'Ivoire
- Democratic Republic of Congo
- Djibouti
- Egypt
- Eswatini
- Ethiopia
- Gabon
- Ghana
- Guinea Bissau
- Guinea
- Kenya
- Liberia
- Libya
- Madagascar
- Malawi
- Mauritius
- Morocco
- Namibia
- Niger
- Nigeria
- Republic of the Congo
- Rwanda
- Senegal
- Seychelles
- Sierra Leone
- Somalia
- South Africa
- South Sudan
- Sudan
- Tanzania
- Togo
- Tunisia
- Uganda
- Zambia
- Zanzibar
- Zimbabwe
