= Colombian Institute of Technical Standards and Certification =

Colombian non-profit private organization

ICONTEC International
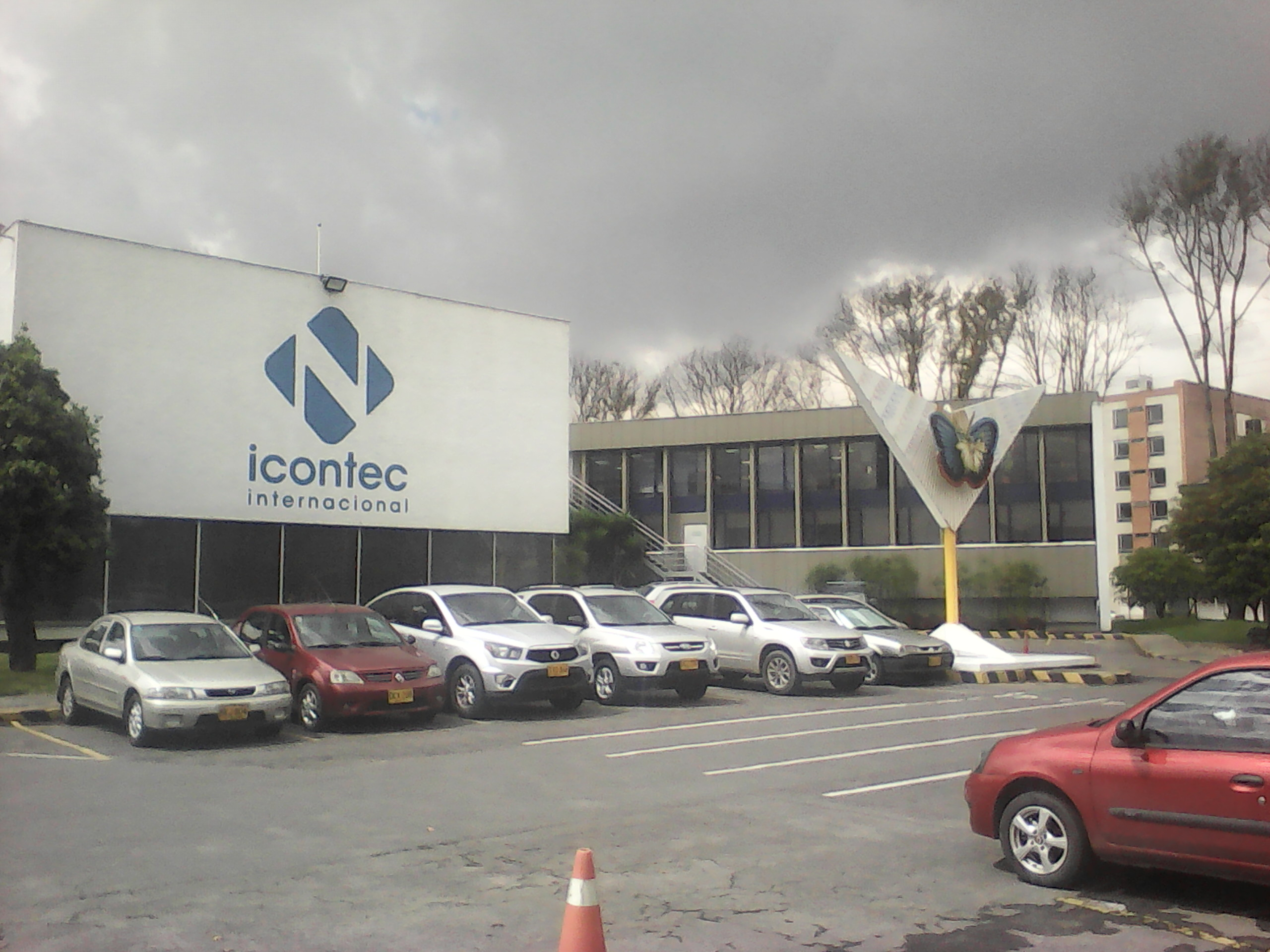
- Formation: May 10, 1963; 63 years ago
- Type: Private
- Legal status: Legal
- Purpose: Standards and International trade
- Headquarters: Bogotá, Colombia
- Location: Carrera 37 52-95,
- Region served: Colombia, South America, Central America and the Caribbean
- Members: Private and official persons
- Official language: Spanish - English
- Affiliations: International Organization for Standardization
- Website: https://www.icontec.org/

The Colombian Institute of Technical Standards and Certification (Spanish: Instituto Colombiano de Normas Técnicas y Certificación; ICONTEC) is a non-profit private organization in Colombia that oversees the compliance of national and international standards. It is an open organization with members from the Colombian government, private sector and any individuals interested in the compliance of standards in Colombia. Icontec works closely with other international organizations for standardization such as ANSI and DIN. Icontec accredits organizations, companies and individuals that engage in the manufacturing or development of products and industrial processes. Icontec is a member of the International Organization for Standardization ISO and is an active partner in regional standards organizations such as COPANT and IEC. Icontec is present in different countries of the Americas and the Caribbean. Its headquarters are in Bogotá, Colombia.
