= Ente Nazionale Italiano di Unificazione =

Italian organization for standardization

Ente Nazionale Italiano di Unificazione

Ente Nazionale Italiano di Unificazione (Italian National Unification, acronym UNI) is a private non-profit association that performs regulatory activities in Italy across industrial, commercial, and service sectors, with the exception of electrical engineering and electronic competence of CEI.

The UNI is recognised by the Italian State and by the European Union and represents Italian legislative activity at the International Standards Organization (ISO) and the European Committee for Standardization (CEN).

Giuseppe Rossi was the president of the organization until 2025, when Marco Spinetto assumed the position.

== History ==
The UNI was formed in 1921 with the initials "UNIM" in the face of demands for standardization of mechanical engineering at the time. At the 1928 General Confederation of Italian Industry (Confindustria), it was promoted to include all sectors of industry, becoming the current UNI.

== Description ==
The main tasks of UNI are:

- develop new standards in collaboration with all stakeholders;
- represent Italy in standardisation activities internationally (ISO) and within Europe (CEN) in order to promote the harmonisation of standards;
- publish and disseminate technical standards and editorial products related to them.

The UNI also avails of federated entities for specific fields of competence. Between them in the field of standardisation in the field of computer science is relevant UNINFO, which is the UNI, the areas of competence at the ISO, the ISO / IEC JTC1 (ISO / IEC Joint Technical Committee), and the CEN.

The other federated entity UNI is the CTI, Italian Committee on Thermo Energy and Environment, which deals with legislative activity in the areas of heating technology and the production and utilisation of thermal energy, both nationally and internationally, where he, on behalf of UNI, maintains the work of numerous groups, including CEN and ISO, and, for some of these, the relative answering techniques.

The most important federated entity, UNI, is today the Italian Gas Committee (CIG), which deals with regulation of the gas sector nationally and internationally and cooperates with many Italian and European institutions in the same sector. Currently, this committee is working on several initiatives with a strong impact on national energy issues, such as the introduction of biomethane in transport networks and the distribution of natural gas, and the European project on the quality of gas, the project of smart metres for natural gas.

The published standards can significantly affect the safety of workers, the public, or the environment, so the government refers to them by recalling them in legislative documents and attributing to them some level of cogency.

== UNI standard designation ==
The designation of a UNI standard shows its origin (# denotes a number):

- UNI # is used for Italian standards with primarily domestic significance or designed as a first step toward international status.
- UNI EN # is used for the Italian edition of European standards.
- UNI ISO # is used for the Italian edition of ISO standards.
- UNI EN ISO # is used if the standard has also been adopted as a European standard.

== See also ==
- World Standards Day
