= Instituto Argentino de Normalización y Certificación =

Official logo of IRAM.

The Argentine Normalization and Certification Institute (Spanish: Instituto Argentino de Normalización y Certificación, IRAM) is the International Organization for Standardization (ISO) member body for Argentina.

It was founded on May 2, 1935, under the name Instituto Argentino de Racionalización de Materiales, IRAM, and is still known as IRAM even though its name was changed in 1996 to Argentine Normalization and Certification Institute.

The organization has branches in various provinces throughout Argentina.
