= Standards Norway =

Norwegian standardization authority

Standards Norway (Norwegian: Standard Norge, SN) is the main standards organization of Norway. It claims responsibility for all standardization areas except for electrotechnical and telecommunication issues. Standards Norway holds the right to the Norwegian Standard trademark (Norwegian: Norsk Standard, abbreviated NS) and represents Norway in the European Committee for Standardization (CEN) and the International Organization for Standardization (ISO). Its headquarters are located in Lilleaker, Oslo.
