= Swedish Institute for Standards =

Swedish standards organization

The Swedish Institute for Standards logo introduced in 2019

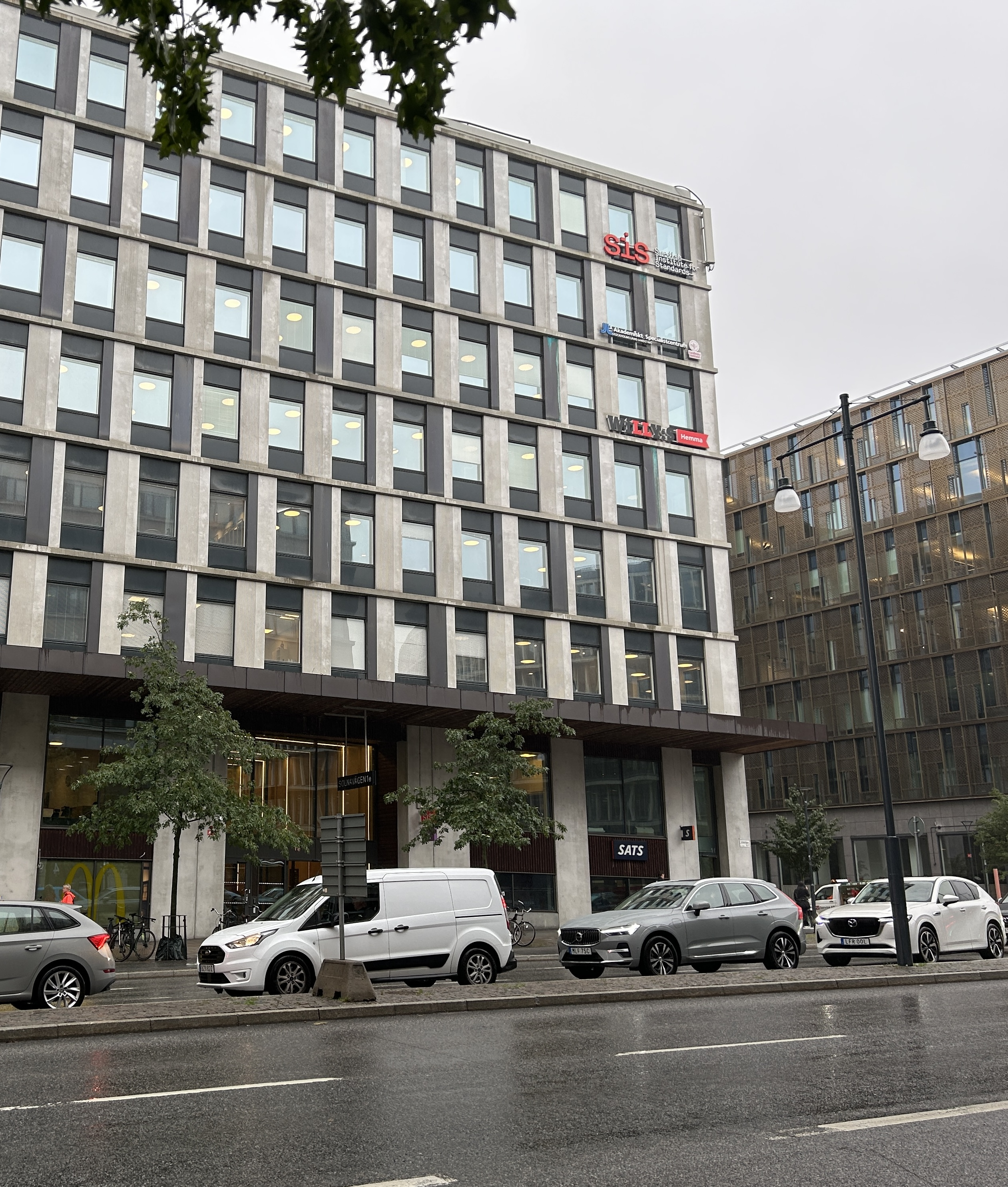
SIS headquarters in Stockholm, 2024

The Swedish Institute for Standards (SIS) Swedish: Svenska institutet för standarder, SIS, is an independent organization, founded in 1922, with members from the private and public sector.

In 2001, all industry standardization bodies in Sweden joined SIS with two exceptions—Svensk Elstandard (SEK) and Svenska informations- och telekommunikationsstandardiseringen (ITS) which were given the right to establish and issue Swedish standards in the areas of electricity, and information and communication technology, respectively.

== Activities ==
SIS and its members develop standards within different domains, including construction, safety, healthcare, consumer products, management systems, engineering, environmental issues and safety. SIS participates in the European and global network which develops international standards. SIS is a member of the European cooperative effort CEN as well as the global ISO. SIS was founded in 1922.

Earlier on, the SIS logotype was often used for indicating that a tool was compliant with Swedish standards, but this has been replaced with the CE mark.

== See also ==
- International Organization for Standardization (ISO)
- European Committee for Standardization (CEN)
- SEK Svensk Elstandard (SEK)
- Svenska informations- och telekommunikationsstandardiseringen (ITS)
