= Lectionary 201 =

Lectionary ℓ 201
- New Testament manuscript
- Text: Evangelistarium
- Date: 13th century
- Script: Greek
- Now at: Bodleian Library
- Size: 26.5 cm by 19.5 cm
- Hand: carelessly written

Lectionary 201, designated by siglum ℓ 201 (in the Gregory-Aland numbering) is a Greek manuscript of the New Testament, on parchment. Palaeographically it has been assigned to the 13th century. Scrivener labelled it by 209^{evl}.

== Description ==
The codex contains lessons from the Gospels of John, Matthew, Luke lectionary (Evangelistarium), with some lacunae. The text is written in Greek minuscule letters, on 187 parchment leaves (26.5 cm by 19.5 cm), in two columns per page, 27 lines per page. It is full of errors of itacism.

According to Scrivener the manuscript is "carelessly and ill written".

There are daily lessons from Easter to Pentecost.

== History ==
Scrivener and Gregory dated the manuscript to the 13th century. It is presently assigned by the INTF to the 13th century.

The manuscript was added to the list of New Testament manuscripts by Scrivener (number 209) and Gregory (number 201). Gregory saw it in 1883.

The manuscript is not cited in the critical editions of the Greek New Testament (UBS3).

Currently the codex is located in the Bodleian Library (E. D. Clarke 48) at Oxford.

== See also ==
- List of New Testament lectionaries
- Biblical manuscript
- Textual criticism

== Bibliography ==
- Gregory, Caspar René (1900). Textkritik des Neuen Testaments, Vol. 1. Leipzig. p. 404.
