= Ancient Greek phonology =

Sounds and pronunciation of Ancient Greek

Ancient Greek phonology is the reconstructed phonology or pronunciation of Ancient Greek. This article mostly deals with the pronunciation of the standard Attic dialect of the fifth century BC, used by Plato and other Classical Greek writers, and touches on other dialects spoken at the same time or earlier. The pronunciation of Ancient Greek is not known from direct observation, but determined from other types of evidence. Some details regarding the pronunciation of Attic Greek and other Ancient Greek dialects are unknown, but it is generally agreed that Attic Greek had certain features not present in English or Modern Greek, such as a three-way distinction between voiced, voiceless, and aspirated stops (such as /b p pʰ/, as in English "bot, spot, pot"); a distinction between single and double consonants and short and long vowels in most positions in a word; and a word accent that involved pitch.

Koine Greek, the variety of Greek used after the conquests of Alexander the Great in the fourth century BC, is sometimes included in Ancient Greek, but its pronunciation is described in Koine Greek phonology. For disagreements with the reconstruction given here, see below.

== Dialects ==
Distribution of Greek dialects in Greece in the classical period.
Western group:
- Doric proper
- Northwest Doric
- Achaean Doric (probably Northwest Doric)
Central group:
- Aeolic
- Arcado-Cypriot
Eastern group:
- Attic
- Ionic

Distribution of Greek dialects in Magna Graecia (Southern Italy and Sicily) in the classical period.
Western group:
- Doric proper
- Northwest Doric
- Achaean Doric (probably Northwest Doric)
Eastern group:
- Attic-Ionic

Ancient Greek was a pluricentric language, consisting of many dialects. All Greek dialects derive from Proto-Greek and they share certain characteristics, but there were also distinct differences in pronunciation. For instance, the form of Doric in Crete had a digraph ⟨θθ⟩, which likely stood for a sound not present in Attic. The early form of Ionic in which the Iliad and Odyssey were composed (Homeric), and the Aeolic dialect of Sappho, likely had the phoneme /w/ at the beginnings of words, sometimes represented by the letter digamma ⟨ϝ⟩, but it had been lost in the standard Attic dialect.

The pluricentric nature of Ancient Greek differs from that of Latin, which was composed of basically one variety from the earliest Old Latin texts until Classical Latin. Latin only formed dialects once it was spread over Europe by the Roman Empire; these Vulgar Latin dialects became the Romance languages.

The main dialect groups of Ancient Greek are Arcadocypriot, Aeolic, Doric, Ionic, and Attic. These form two main groups: East Greek, which includes Arcadocypriot, Aeolic, Ionic, and Attic, and West Greek, which consists of Doric along with Northwest Greek and Achaean.

Of the main dialects, all but Arcadocypriot have literature in them. The Ancient Greek literary dialects do not necessarily represent the native speech of the authors that use them. A primarily Ionic-Aeolic dialect, for instance, is used in epic poetry, while pure Aeolic is used in lyric poetry. Both Attic and Ionic are used in prose, and Attic is used in most parts of the Athenian tragedies, with Doric forms in the choral sections.

=== Early East Greek ===
Most of the East Greek dialects palatalized or assibilated /t/ to [s] before /i/. West Greek, including Doric, did not undergo this sound change in certain cases, and through the influence of Doric neither did the Thessalian and Boeotian dialects of Aeolic.

- Attic τίθησι, Doric τίθητι ('he places')

Attic εἰσί, Doric ἐντί ('they are')
Attic εἴκοσι, Doric ϝῑκατι ('twenty')

Arcadocypriot was one of the first Greek dialects in Greece. Mycenaean Greek, the form of Greek spoken before the Greek Dark Ages, seems to be an early form of Arcadocypriot. Clay tablets with Mycenaean Greek in Linear B have been found over a wide area, from Thebes in Central Greece, to Mycenae and Pylos on the Peloponnese, to Knossos on Crete. However, during the Ancient Greek period, Arcadocypriot was only spoken in Arcadia, in the interior of the Peloponnese, and on Cyprus. The dialects of these two areas remained remarkably similar despite the great geographical distance.

Aeolic is closely related to Arcadocypriot. It was originally spoken in eastern Greece north of the Peloponnese: in Thessaly, in Locris, Phocis, and southern Aetolia, and in Boeotia, a region close to Athens. Aeolic was carried to Aeolis, on the coast of Asia Minor, and the nearby island of Lesbos. By the time of Ancient Greek, the only Aeolic dialects that remained in Greece were Thessalian and Boeotian. The Aeolic dialects of Greece adopted some characteristics of Doric, since they were located near Doric-speaking areas, while the Aeolian and Lesbian dialects did not.

Boeotian underwent vowel shifts similar to those that occurred later in Koine Greek, converting /ai̯/ to [ɛː], /eː/ to [iː], and /oi̯/ to [yː]. These are reflected in spelling (see Boeotian Greek phonology). Aeolic also retained /w/.

Homeric or Epic Greek, the literary form of Archaic Greek used in the epic poems, Iliad and the Odyssey, is based on early Ionic and Aeolic, with Arcadocypriot forms. In its original form, it likely had the semivowel /w/, as indicated by the meter in some cases. This sound is sometimes written as ⟨Ϝ⟩ in inscriptions, but not in the Attic-influenced text of Homer.

=== West Greek ===
The Doric dialect, the most important member of West Greek, originated from western Greece. Through the Dorian invasion, Doric displaced the native Arcadocypriot and Aeolic dialects in some areas of central Greece, on the Peloponnese, and on Crete, and strongly influenced the Thessalian and Boeotian dialects of Aeolic.

Doric dialects are classified by which vowel they have as the result of compensatory lengthening and contraction: those that have η ω are called Severer or Old, and those that have ει ου, as Attic does, are called Milder or New. Laconian and Cretan, spoken in Laconia, the region of Sparta, and on Crete, are two Old Doric dialects.

Ancient Macedonian, Thessalian, Elean, and Epirote shared an "oddity" of cases where voiced stops (/b d g/, written ⟨β ð ɣ⟩) appear to correspond to Proto-Indo-European voiced aspirates /bʰ dʰ ɡʰ/. In most Greek, the Proto-Indo-European aspirates were devoiced to voiceless aspirates /pʰ tʰ kʰ/, written ⟨ɸ θ χ⟩ (though these would later become fricatives in Attic Koine around the first century AD). As with Macedonian, this phenomenon is sometimes attributed to non-Greek substrate and adstrate influence, with some linguists attributing such an influence on Epirote to Illyrian. Filos, however, notes, that the attribution of ⟨β⟩, ⟨ð⟩ and ⟨ɣ⟩ for specifically voiced stops is not secure. Emilio Crespo, a researcher at the Autonomous University of Madrid, wrote that "the voicing of voiceless stops and the development of aspirates into voiced fricatives turns out to be the outcome of an internal development of Macedonian as a dialect of Greek" without excluding "the presence of interference from other languages or of any linguistic substrate or adstrate", as also argued by M. Hatzopoulos.

=== Attic and Ionic ===
Attic and Ionic share a vowel shift not present in any other East or West Greek dialects. They both raised Proto-Greek long /aː/ to [æː] (see below). Later on, Attic lowered [æː] found immediately after /e i r/ back to [aː], differentiating itself from Ionic. This long vowel then merged with /ɛː/ and was noted ⟨Η⟩ in the Ionic alphabet (which became used by the Athenians in the classical era) All other East and West Greek dialects retain original /aː/.

Ionic was spoken around the Aegean Sea, including in Ionia, a region of Anatolia south of Aeolis, for which it was named. Ionic contracts vowels less often than Attic (see below).

Attic is usually the dialect taught in modern introductory Ancient Greek courses, and the one that has much of the most important literature written in it. It was spoken in Athens and Attica, the surrounding region. Old Attic, which was used by the historian Thucydides and the tragedians, replaced the native Attic /tt rr/ with the /ss rs/ of other dialects. Later writers, such as Plato, use the native Attic forms.

=== Later Greek ===
Koine, the form of Greek spoken during the Hellenistic period, was primarily based on Attic Greek, with some influences from other dialects. It underwent many sound changes, including development of aspirated and voiced stops into fricatives and the shifting of many vowels and diphthongs to [i] (iotacism). In the Byzantine period it developed into Medieval Greek, which later became standard Modern Greek or Demotic.

Tsakonian, a modern form of Greek mutually unintelligible with Standard Modern Greek, derived from the Laconian variety of Doric, and is therefore the only surviving descendant of a non-Attic dialect.

== Consonants ==
Attic Greek had about 15 consonant phonemes: nine plosives, two fricatives, and four or six sonorants. Modern Greek has about the same number of consonants. The main difference between the two is that Modern Greek has a voicing contrast in fricatives developed from the lenition of Ancient Greek voiced and aspirated plosives.

In the table below, the phonemes of standard Attic are unmarked, allophones are enclosed in parentheses. The sounds marked by asterisks appear in dialects or in earlier forms of Greek, but may not be phonemes in standard Attic.

Consonant phones
		Labial	Coronal	Palatal	Velar	Glottal
Plosive	aspirated	pʰ	tʰ		kʰ	
Plosive	tenuis	p	t		k	
Plosive	voiced	b	d		ɡ	
Nasal		m	n		(ŋ)	
Fricative	voiceless		s			h
Fricative	voiced		(z)			
Trill	voiceless		(r̥)			
Trill	voiced		r			
Approximant	voiceless		l̥*		w̥*	
Approximant	voiced		l	j*	w*	

=== Plosives ===
Triads of plosives
labial	ἔφη, ἔπη, ἔβη "he said, words, he stepped"
dental	θέσις, τάσις, δασύς "putting, stretching, hairy"
velar	χώρα, κόρη, ἀγορά "country, girl, assembly"

Ancient Greek had nine plosives. The grammarians classified them in three groups, distinguished by voice-onset time: voiceless aspirated, voiceless unaspirated (tenuis), and voiced. The aspirated stops are written /pʰ tʰ kʰ/. The tenuis stops are written /p˭ t˭ k˭/, with ⟨˭⟩ representing lack of aspiration and voicing, or /p t k/. The voiced stops are written /b d ɡ/. For the Ancient Greek terms for these three groups, see below; see also the section on spirantization.

English distinguishes two types of plosives: voiceless and voiced. Voiceless plosives have three main pronunciations (allophones): moderately aspirated at the beginning of a word before a vowel, unaspirated after /s/, and unaspirated, unreleased, glottalized, or debuccalized at the end of a word. English voiced plosives are often only partially voiced. Thus, some pronunciations of the English plosives are similar to the pronunciations of Ancient Greek plosives.

=== Fricatives ===
Attic Greek had only two fricative phonemes: the voiceless alveolar sibilant /s/ and the glottal fricative /h/.

/h/ is often called the aspirate (see below). Attic generally kept it, but some non-Attic dialects during the Classical period lost it (see below). It mostly occurred at the beginning of words, because it was usually lost between vowels, except in two rare words. Also, when a stem beginning with /h/ was the second part of a compound word, the /h/ sometimes remained, probably depending on whether the speaker recognized that the word was a compound. This can be seen in Old Attic inscriptions, where /h/ was written using the letterform of eta (see below), which was the source of ⟨H⟩ in the Latin alphabet:

- Old Attic inscriptional forms

ΕΥΗΟΡΚΟΝ /eú.hor.kon/, later εὔορκον /eú.or.kon/ ('faithful to an oath')
ΠΑΡΗΕΔΡΟΙ /pár.he.droi/, later πάρεδροι /pá.re.droi/ ('sitting beside, assessors')
ΠΡΟΣΗΕΚΕΤΟ /pros.hɛː.ké.tɔː/, later προσηκέτω /pro.sɛː.ké.tɔː/ ('let him be present')

- εὐαἵ /eu.haí/ ('yay!')
- ταὧς /ta.hɔ̂ːs/ ('peacock')

/s/ was a voiceless coronal sibilant. It was transcribed using the symbol for /s/ in Coptic and an Indo-Aryan language, as in Dianisiyasa for Διονυσίου ('of Dionysius') on an Indian coin. This indicates that the Greek sound was a hissing sound rather than a hushing sound: like English s in see rather than sh in she. It was pronounced as a voiced [z] before voiced consonants.

According to W.S. Allen, zeta ⟨ζ⟩ in Attic Greek likely represented the consonant cluster /sd/, phonetically [zd]. For metrical purposes it was treated as a double consonant, thus forming a heavy syllable. In Archaic Greek, when the letter was adopted from Phoenician zayin, the sound was probably an affricate [dz]. In Koine Greek, ⟨ζ⟩ represented /z/. It is more likely that this developed from [dz] rather than from Attic /sd/.

- Ζεύς ('Zeus') — Archaic /d͡zeús/, Attic /sdeús/ [zdeǔs], late Koine /zefs/

/p k/ in the clusters /ps ks/ were somewhat aspirated, as [pʰs] and [kʰs], but in this case the aspiration of the first element was not phonologically contrastive: no words distinguish /ps *pʰs *bs/, for example (see below for explanation).

=== Nasals ===
Ancient Greek has two nasals: the bilabial nasal /m/, written μ and the alveolar nasal /n/, written ν. Depending on the phonetic environment, the phoneme /n/ was pronounced as [m n ŋ]; see below. On occasion, the /n/ phoneme participates in true gemination without any assimilation in place of articulation, as for example in the word ἐννέα. Artificial gemination for metrical purposes is also found occasionally, as in the form ἔννεπε, occurring in the first verse of Homer's Odyssey.

=== Liquids ===
Ancient Greek has the liquids /l/ and /r/, written λ and ρ respectively.

The letter lambda λ probably represented a lateral ("clear") [l] as in Modern Greek and most European languages, rather than a velarized ("dark") [ɫ] as in English in coda position and in Balto-Slavic languages.

The letter rho ρ was pronounced as an alveolar trill [r], as in Italian or Modern Greek rather than as in standard varieties of English or French. At the beginning of a word, it was pronounced as a voiceless alveolar trill [r̥]. In some cases, initial ⟨ρ⟩ in poetry was pronounced as a geminate (phonemically /rr/, phonetically [r̥ː]), shown by the fact that the previous syllable is counted as heavy: for instance τίνι ῥυθμῷ must be pronounced as τίνι ρρυθμῷ in Euripides, Electra 772, τὰ ῥήματα as τὰ ρρήματα in Aristophanes' play The Frogs 1059, and βέλεα ῥέον as βέλεα ρρέον in the Iliad 12.159.

=== Semivowels ===
The semivowels /j w/ were not present in classical Attic Greek at the beginnings of words. However, diphthongs ending in /i u/ were usually pronounced with a double semivowel [jj ww] or [jː wː] before a vowel. Allen suggests that these were simply semivocalic allophones of the vowels, although in some cases they developed from earlier semivowels.

The labio-velar approximant /w/ at the beginning of a syllable survived in some non-Attic dialects, such as Arcadian and Aeolic; a voiceless labio-velar approximant /ʍ/ probably also occurred in Pamphylian and Boeotian. /w/ is sometimes written with the letter digamma ⟨Ϝ⟩, and later with ⟨Β⟩ and ⟨ΟΥ⟩, and /ʍ/ was written with digamma and heta ⟨ϜΗ⟩:

- Pamphylian ϜΗΕ /ʍe/, written as ἕ in Homer (the reflexive pronoun)
- Boeotian ϜΗΕΚΑΔΑΜΟΕ /ʍe.ka.daː.moe/ for Attic Ἑκαδήμῳ Akademos

Evidence from the poetic meter of Homer suggests that /w ʍ/ also occurred in the Archaic Greek of the Iliad and Odyssey, although they would not have been pronounced by Attic speakers and are not written in the Attic-influenced form of the text. The presence of these consonants would explain some cases of absence of elision, some cases in which the meter demands a heavy syllable but the text has a light syllable (positional quantity), and some cases in which a long vowel before a short vowel is not shortened (absence of epic correption).

In the table below the scansion of the examples is shown with the breve ⟨˘⟩ for light syllables, the macron ⟨¯⟩ for heavy ones, and the pipe ⟨|⟩ for the divisions between metrical feet. The sound /w/ is written using digamma, and /ʍ/ with digamma and rough breathing, although the letter never appears in the actual text.

Examples of /w/ in Homer
location	Iliad 1.30	Iliad 1.108	Iliad 7.281	Iliad 5.343
scansion	˘˘|¯¯	¯|¯˘˘	¯|¯˘˘|¯¯	˘|¯˘˘
standard text	ἐνὶ οἴκῳ	εἶπας ἔπος	καὶ ἴδμεν ἅπαντες	ἀπὸ ἕο
Attic pronunciation	/e.ní.oí.kɔː/	/ée.pa.sé.po.s/	/kaí.íd.me.ná.pan.tes/	/a.pó.hé.o/
original form	ἐνὶ ϝοίκῳ	εἶπας ϝέπος	καὶ ϝίδμεν ἅπαντες	ἀπὸ ῾ϝϝέο
Archaic pronunciation	/e.ní.woí.kɔːi̯/	/ée.pas.wé.po.s/	/kaí.wíd.me.ná.pan.tes/	/a.póʍ.ʍé.o/

=== Doubled consonants ===
Single and double (geminated) consonants were distinguished from each other in Ancient Greek: for instance, /p kʰ s r/ contrasted with /pː kʰː sː rː/ (also written /pp kkʰ ss rr/). In Ancient Greek poetry, a vowel followed by a double consonant counts as a heavy syllable in meter. Doubled consonants usually only occur between vowels, not at the beginning or the end of a word, except in the case of /r/, for which see above.

Gemination was lost in Standard Modern Greek, so that all consonants that used to be geminated are pronounced as singletons. Cypriot Greek, the Modern Greek dialect of Cyprus, however, preserves geminate consonants.

A doubled ⟨ττ⟩ /tː/ in Attic corresponds to a ⟨σσ⟩ /sː/ in Ionic and other dialects. This sound arose from historic palatalization (see below).

== Vowels ==
Archaic and Classical Greek vowels and diphthongs varied by dialect. The tables below show the vowels of Classical Attic in the IPA, paired with the vowel letters that represent them in the standard Ionic alphabet. The earlier Old Attic alphabet had certain differences. Attic Greek of the 5th century BC likely had 5 short and 7 long vowels: /a e i y o/ and /aː ɛː eː iː yː uː ɔː/. Vowel length was phonemic: some words are distinguished from each other by vowel length. In addition, Classical Attic had many diphthongs, all ending in /i/ or /u/; these are discussed below.

In standard Ancient Greek spelling, the long vowels /eː ɛː uː ɔː/ (spelled ει η ου ω) are distinguished from the short vowels /e o/ (spelled ε ο), but the long–short pairs /a aː/, /i iː/, and /y yː/ are each written with a single letter, α, ι, υ. This is the reason for the terms for vowel letters described below. In grammars, textbooks, or dictionaries, α, ι, υ are sometimes marked with macrons ⟨ᾱ, ῑ, ῡ⟩ to indicate that they are long, or breves ⟨ᾰ, ῐ, ῠ⟩ to indicate that they are short.

For the purposes of accent, vowel length is measured in morae: long vowels and most diphthongs count as two morae; short vowels, and the diphthongs /ai oi/ in certain endings, count as one mora. A one-mora vowel could be accented with high pitch, but two-mora vowels could be accented with falling or rising pitch.

=== Monophthongs ===
	Front				Central		Back	
	unrounded		rounded		Central		Back	
	short	long	short	long	short	long	short	long
Close	i ⟨ῐ⟩	iː ⟨ῑ⟩	y ⟨ῠ⟩	yː ⟨ῡ/υι⟩			(u) ⟨υ⟩	uː ⟨ου⟩
Close-mid	e ⟨ε⟩	eː ⟨ει⟩					o ⟨ο⟩	uː ⟨ου⟩
Open-mid	e ⟨ε⟩	ɛː ⟨η⟩					o ⟨ο⟩	ɔː ⟨ω⟩
Open					a ⟨ᾰ⟩	aː ⟨ᾱ⟩		

- /u/ is found only as the second element of diphthongs.

==== Close and open vowels ====
The close and open short vowels /i y a/ were similar in quality to the corresponding long vowels /iː yː aː/.

Proto-Greek close back rounded /u uː/ shifted to front /y yː/ early in Attic and Ionic, around the 6th or 7th century BC (see below). /u/ remained only in diphthongs; it did not shift in Boeotian, so when Boeotians adopted the Attic alphabet, they wrote their unshifted /u uː/ using ⟨ΟΥ⟩.

==== Mid vowels ====
The situation with the mid vowels was more complex. In the early Classical period, there were two short mid vowels /e o/, but four long mid vowels: close-mid /eː oː/ and open-mid /ɛː ɔː/. Since the short mid vowels changed to long close-mid /eː oː/ rather than long open-mid /ɛː ɔː/ by compensatory lengthening in Attic, E.H. Sturtevant suggests that the short mid vowels were close-mid, but Allen says this is not necessarily true.

By the mid-4th century BC, the close-mid back /oː/ shifted to /uː/, partly because /u uː/ had shifted to /y yː/. Similarly, the close-mid front /eː/ changed to /iː/, the change beginning in the late 4th century and becoming common in the 3rd. These changes triggered a shift of the open-mid vowels /ɛː ɔː/ to become mid or close-mid /eː oː/, and this is the pronunciation they had in early Koine Greek.

In Latin, on the other hand, all short vowels except for /a/ were much more open than the corresponding long vowels. This made long /eː oː/ similar in quality to short /i u/, and for this reason the letters ⟨I E⟩ and ⟨V O⟩ were frequently confused with each other in Roman inscriptions. This also explains the vocalism of New Testament Greek words such as λεγεών ('legion'; < Lat. legio) or λέντιον ('towel'; < Lat. linteum), where Latin ⟨i⟩ was perceived to be similar to Greek ⟨ε⟩.

In Attic, the open-mid /ɛː ɔː/ and close-mid /eː oː/ each have three main origins. Some cases of the open-mid vowels /ɛː ɔː/ developed from Proto-Greek *ē ō. In other cases they developed from contraction. Finally, some cases of /ɛː/, only in Attic and Ionic, developed from earlier /aː/ by the Attic–Ionic vowel shift.

In a few cases, the long close-mid vowels /eː oː/ developed from monophthongization of the pre-Classical falling diphthongs /ei ou/. In most cases, they arose through compensatory lengthening of the short vowels /e o/ or through contraction.

In both Aeolic and Doric, Proto-Greek /aː/ did not shift to /ɛː/. In some dialects of Doric, such as Laconian and Cretan, contraction and compensatory lengthening resulted in open-mid vowels /ɛː ɔː/, and in others they resulted in the close-mid /eː oː/. Sometimes the Doric dialects using the open-mid vowels are called Severer, and the ones using the close-mid vowels are called Milder.

=== Diphthongs ===
Attic had many diphthongs, all falling diphthongs with /i u/ as the second semivocalic element, and either with a short or long first element. Diphthongs with a short first element are sometimes called "proper diphthongs", while diphthongs with a long first element are sometimes called "improper diphthongs." Whether they have a long or a short first element, all diphthongs count as two morae when applying the accent rules, like long vowels, except for /ai oi/ in certain cases. Overall Attic and Koine show a pattern of monophthongization: they tend to change diphthongs to single vowels.

The most common diphthongs were /ai au eu oi/ and /ɛːi̯ aːi̯ ɔːi̯/. The long diphthongs /ɛːu̯ aːu̯ ɔːu̯/ occurred rarely. The short diphthongs /ei ou yi/ changed to /eː oː yː/ in the early Classical period in most cases, but /ei yi/ remained before vowels.

In the tables below, the diphthongs that were monophthongized in most cases are preceded by an asterisk, and the rarer diphthongs are in parentheses.

Diphthongs with short first element
Type	Front	Back
Close	*/yi̯/ υι	
Short mid	*/ei̯/ ει /eu̯/ ευ	/oi̯/ οι */ou̯/ ου
Open	/ai̯/ ᾰι /au̯/ ᾰυ	

Diphthongs with long first element
Type	Front	Back
Long open-mid	/ɛːi̯/ ῃ (/ɛːu̯/ ηυ)	/ɔːi̯/ ῳ (/ɔːu̯/ ωυ)
Open	/aːi̯/ ᾳ (/aːu̯/ ᾱυ)	

The second element of a diphthong /i u/ was often pronounced as a doubled semivowel [jj ww] or [jː wː] before vowels, and in other cases it was often lost:

- Ἀθηναῖοι /a.tʰɛɛ.nái.oi/ ('Athenians'): [a.tʰɛː.naĵ.joi]
- ποιῶ /poi.ɔ́ɔ/ ('I do'): either [poj.jɔ̂ː] or [po.jɔ̂ː]
- Doric στοιᾱ́ /stoi.aá/: [sto.jǎː]

Attic στοᾱ́ /sto.aá/: [sto.ǎː]

- κελεύω /ke.leú.ɔː/ ('I command'): [ke.lew̌.wɔː]
- σημεῖον /sɛɛ.méi.on/ ('sign'): [sɛː.meĵ.jon]

The diphthong /oi/ merged with the long close front rounded vowel /yː/ in Koine. It likely first became [øi]. Change to [øi] would be assimilation: the back vowel [o] becoming front [ø] because of the following front vowel [i]. This may have been the pronunciation in Classical Attic. Later it must have become [øː], parallel to the monophthongization of /ei ou/, and then [yː], but when words with ⟨οι⟩ were borrowed into Latin, the Greek digraph was represented with the Latin digraph ⟨oe⟩, representing the diphthong /oe/.

Thucydides reports the confusion of two words (2:54), which makes more sense if /oi/ was pronounced [øi]:

- λοιμός /loi.mós/ ('plague'): possibly [løi.mós]

λῑμός /lii.mós/ ('famine'): [liː.mós]

In the diphthongs /au̯ eu̯ ɛːu̯/, the offglide /u/ became a consonant in Koine Greek, and they became Modern Greek /av ev iv/. The long diphthongs /aːi̯ ɛːi̯ ɔːi̯/ lost their offglide and merged with the long vowels /aː ɛː ɔː/ by the time of Koine Greek. /ɔːu̯/, on the other hand, was extremely rare outside of Ionic Greek, though occurred in certain Hebrew transcriptions such as Μωυσῆς ('Moses' < Heb. מֹשֶׁה), which later regularized into monophthongized Μωσῆς (> English Moses) and trisyllabic Μωϋσῆς (> Spanish Moisés).

== Spelling ==
Many different forms of the Greek alphabet were used for the regional dialects of the Greek language during the Archaic and early Classical periods. The Attic dialect, however, used two forms. The first was the Old Attic alphabet, and the second is the Ionic alphabet, introduced to Athens around the end of the 5th century BC during the archonship of Eucleides. The last is the standard alphabet in modern editions of Ancient Greek texts, and the one used for Classical Attic, standard Koine, and Medieval Greek, finally developing into the alphabet used for Modern Greek.

=== Consonant spelling ===
Most double consonants are written using double letters: ⟨ππ σσ ρρ⟩ represent /pː sː rː/ or /pp ss rr/. The geminate versions of the aspirated stops /pʰː tʰː kʰː/ are written with the digraphs ⟨πφ τθ κχ⟩, and geminate /ɡː/ is written as ⟨κγ⟩, since ⟨γγ⟩ represents [ŋɡ] in the standard orthography of Ancient Greek.

- ἔκγονος (ἐκ-γονος) /éɡ.ɡo.nos/ ('offspring'), occasionally εγγονοσ in inscriptions

ἐγγενής /eŋ.ɡe.nɛɛ́s/ ('inborn') (εν-γενής)

/s/ was written with sigma ⟨Σ σ ς⟩. The clusters /ps ks/ were written as ⟨ΦΣ ΧΣ⟩ in the Old Attic alphabet, but as ⟨Ψ Ξ⟩ in the standard Ionic alphabet.

Voiceless /r/ is usually written with the spiritus asper as ῥ- and transcribed as rh in Latin. The same orthography is sometimes encountered when /r/ is geminated, as in ⟨συρρέω⟩, sometimes written ⟨συῤῥέω⟩, giving rise to the transliteration rrh.

=== Vowel spelling ===
The close front rounded vowels /y/ and /yː/ (an evolution of /u/ and /uː/ respectively) are both represented in writing by the letter upsilon (υ) irrespective of length.

In Classical Attic, the spellings ει and ου represented respectively the vowels /eː/ and /uː/ (the latter being an evolution of /oː/), from original diphthongs, compensatory lengthening, or contraction.

The above information about the usage of the vowel letters applies to the classical orthography of Attic, after Athens took over the orthographic conventions of the Ionic alphabet in 403 BC. In the earlier, traditional Attic orthography there was only a smaller repertoire of vowel symbols: α, ε, ι, ο, and υ. The letters η and ω were still missing. All five vowel symbols could at that stage denote either a long or a short vowel. Moreover, the letters ε and ο could respectively denote the long open-mid /ɛː, ɔː/, the long close-mid /eː, oː/ and the short mid phonemes /e, o/. The Ionic alphabet brought the new letters η and ω for the one set of long vowels, and the convention of using the digraph spellings ει and ου for the other, leaving simple ε and ο to be used only for the short vowels. However, the remaining vowel letters α, ι and υ continued to be ambiguous between long and short phonemes.

=== Spelling of /h/ ===
In the Old Attic alphabet, /h/ was written with the letterform of eta ⟨Η⟩. In the Ionic dialect of Asia Minor, /h/ was lost early on, and the letter ⟨Η⟩ in the Ionic alphabet represented /ɛː/. In 403 BC, when the Ionic alphabet was adopted in Athens, the sound /h/ ceased to be represented in writing.

In some inscriptions /h/ was represented by a symbol formed from the left-hand half of the original letter: ⟨Ͱ⟩. Later grammarians, during the time of the Hellenistic Koine, developed that symbol further into a diacritic, the rough breathing (δασὺ πνεῦμα; Latin: spiritus asper; δασεῖα for short), which was written on the top of the initial vowel. Correspondingly, they introduced the mirror image diacritic called smooth breathing (ψιλὸν πνεῦμα; Latin: spiritus lenis; ψιλή for short), which indicated the absence of /h/. These marks were not used consistently until the time of the Byzantine Empire.

== Phonotactics ==
Ancient Greek words were divided into syllables. A word has one syllable for every short vowel, long vowel, or diphthong. In addition, syllables began with a consonant if possible, and sometimes ended with a consonant. Consonants at the beginning of the syllable are the syllable onset, the vowel in the middle is a nucleus, and the consonant at the end is a coda.

In dividing words into syllables, each vowel or diphthong belongs to one syllable. A consonant between vowels goes with the following vowel. In the following transcriptions, a period ⟨.⟩ separates syllables.

- λέγω ('I say'): /lé.ɡɔɔ/ (two syllables)
- τοιαῦται ('this kind') (fem pl): /toi.âu.tai/ (three syllables)
- βουλεύσειε ('if only he would want'): /buː.leú.sei.e/ (four syllables)
- ἠελίοιο ('sun's') (Homeric Greek): /ɛɛ.e.lí.oi.o/ (five syllables)

Any remaining consonants are added at the end of a syllable. And when a double consonant occurs between vowels, it is divided between syllables. One half of the double consonant goes to the previous syllable, forming a coda, and one goes to the next, forming an onset. Clusters of two or three consonants are also usually divided between syllables, with at least one consonant joining the previous vowel and forming the syllable coda of its syllable, but see below.

- ἄλλος ('another'): /ál.los/
- ἔστιν ('there is'): /és.tin/
- δόξα ('opinion'): /dók.sa/
- ἐχθρός ('enemy'): /ekʰ.tʰrós/

=== Syllable weight ===
Syllables in Ancient Greek were either light or heavy. This distinction is important in Ancient Greek poetry, which was made up of patterns of heavy and light syllables. Syllable weight is based on both consonants and vowels. Ancient Greek accent, by contrast, is only based on vowels.

A syllable ending in a short vowel, or the diphthongs αι and οι in certain noun and verb endings, was light. All other syllables were heavy: that is, syllables ending in a long vowel or diphthong, a short vowel and consonant, or a long vowel or diphthong and consonant.

- λέγω /lé.ɡɔɔ/: light – heavy;
- τοιαῦται /toi.âu.tai/: heavy – heavy – light;
- βουλεύσειε /buː.leú.sei.e/: heavy – heavy – heavy – light;
- ἠελίοιο /ɛɛ.e.lí.oi.o/: heavy – light – light – heavy – light.

Greek grammarians called heavy syllables μακραί ('long', singular μακρά), and placed them in two categories. They called a syllable with a long vowel or diphthong φύσει μακρά ('long by nature'), and a syllable ending in a consonant θέσει μακρά ('long by position'). These terms were translated into Latin as naturā longa and positiōne longa. However, Indian grammarians distinguished vowel length and syllable weight by using the terms heavy and light for syllable quantity and the terms long and short only for vowel length. This article adopts their terminology, since not all metrically heavy syllables have long vowels; e.g.:

- ἥ (fem rel pron) /hɛɛ́/ is a heavy syllable having a long vowel, "long by nature";
- οἷ (masc dat sg pron) /hói/ is a heavy syllable having a diphthong, "long by nature";
- ὅς (masc rel pron) /hós/ is a heavy syllable ending in a consonant, "long by position".

Poetic meter shows which syllables in a word counted as heavy, and knowing syllable weight allows us to determine how consonant clusters were divided between syllables. Syllables before double consonants, and most syllables before consonant clusters, count as heavy. Here the letters ⟨ζ, ξ and ψ⟩ count as consonant clusters. This indicates that double consonants and most consonant clusters were divided between syllables, with at least the first consonant belonging to the preceding syllable.

- ἄλλος /ál.los/ ('different'): heavy – heavy
- ὥστε /hɔɔ́s.te/ ('so that'): heavy – light
- ἄξιος /ák.si.os/ ('worthy'): heavy – light – heavy
- προσβλέψαιμι /pros.blép.sai.mi/ ('may I see!'): heavy – heavy – heavy – light
- χαριζομένη /kʰa.ris.do.mé.nɛɛ/ ('rejoicing' fem sg): light – heavy – light – light – heavy

In Attic poetry, syllables before a cluster of a stop and a liquid or nasal are commonly light rather than heavy. This was called correptio Attica ('Attic shortening'), since here an ordinarily "long" syllable became "short".

- πατρός ('of a father'): Homeric /pat.rós/ (heavy-heavy), Attic /pa.trós/ (light-heavy)

=== Onset ===
In Attic Greek, any single consonant and many consonant clusters can occur as a syllable onset (the beginning of a syllable). Certain consonant clusters occur as onsets, while others do not occur.

Six stop clusters occur. All of them agree in voice-onset time, and begin with a labial or velar and end with a dental. Thus, the clusters /pʰtʰ kʰtʰ pt kt bd ɡd/ are allowed. Certain stop clusters do not occur as onsets: clusters beginning with a dental and ending with a labial or velar, and clusters of stops that disagree in voice onset time.

Initial stop clusters in Ancient Greek
		Aspirated		Voiceless	
Beginning with	Labial	φθόγγος 'sound'	[pʰtʰóŋɡos]	πτερόν 'wing'	[pterón]
Beginning with	Velar	χθών 'earth'	[kʰtʰɔ̌ːn]	κτῆμα 'property'	[ktɛ̂ːma]

=== Coda ===
In Ancient Greek, any vowel may end a word, but the only consonants that may normally end a word are /n r s/. If a stop ended a word in Proto-Indo-European, this was dropped in Ancient Greek, as in ποίημα (from ποίηματ; compare the genitive singular ποιήματος). Other consonants may end a word, however, when a final vowel is elided before a word beginning in a vowel, as in ἐφ᾿ ἵππῳ (from ἐπὶ ἵππῳ).

== Accent ==
Ancient Greek had a pitch accent, unlike the stress accent of Modern Greek and English. One mora of a word was accented with high pitch. A mora is a unit of vowel length; in Ancient Greek, short vowels have one mora and long vowels and diphthongs have two morae. Thus, a one-mora vowel could have accent on its one mora, and a two-mora vowel could have accent on either of its two morae. The position of accent was free, with certain limitations. In a given word, it could appear in several different positions, depending on the lengths of the vowels in the word.

In the examples below, long vowels and diphthongs are represented with two vowel symbols, one for each mora. This does not mean that the long vowel has two separate vowels in different syllables. Syllables are separated by periods ⟨.⟩; any sound between two periods is pronounced in one syllable.

- η (long vowel with two morae): phonemic transcription /ɛɛ/, phonetic transcription [ɛː] (one syllable)
- εε (two short vowels with one mora each): phonemic transcription /e.e/, phonetic transcription [e̞.e̞] (two syllables)

The accented mora is marked with acute accent ⟨´⟩. A vowel with rising pitch contour is marked with a caron ⟨ˇ⟩, and a vowel with a falling pitch contour is marked with a circumflex ⟨ˆ⟩.

The position of the accent in Ancient Greek was phonemic and distinctive: certain words are distinguished by which mora in them is accented. The position of the accent was also distinctive on long vowels and diphthongs: either the first or the second mora could be accented. Phonetically, a two-mora vowel had a rising or falling pitch contour, depending on which of its two morae was accented:

Examples of pitch accent
Greek		τόμος	τομός	εἶμι	εἴτε	εἰμί	ἦτε	ἤτε	οἶκοι	οἴκοι
Translation		'a slice'	'sharp'	'I go'	'either'	'I am'	'you were'	'or'	'houses'	'at home'
IPA	Phonemic	/tó.mos/	/to.mós/	/éi.mi/	/eé.te/	/eː.mí/	/ɛ́ɛ.te/	/ɛɛ́.te/	/ói.koi/	/oí.koi/
IPA	Phonetic	/tó.mos/	/to.mós/	[êː.mi]	[ěː.te]	/eː.mí/	[ɛ̂ː.te]	[ɛ̌ː.te]	[oî.koi]	[oǐ.koi]

Accent marks were never used until around 200 BC. They were first used in Alexandria, and Aristophanes of Byzantium is said to have invented them. There are three: the acute, circumflex, and grave ⟨´ ῀ `⟩. The shape of the circumflex is a merging of the acute and grave.

The acute represented high or rising pitch, the circumflex represented falling pitch, but what the grave represented is uncertain. Early on, the grave was used on every syllable without an acute or circumflex. Here the grave marked all unaccented syllables, which had lower pitch than the accented syllable.

- Θὲόδὼρὸς /tʰe.ó.dɔː.ros/

Later on, a grave was only used to replace a final acute before another full word; the acute was kept before an enclitic or at the end of a phrase. This usage was standardized in the Byzantine era, and is used in modern editions of Ancient Greek texts. Here it might mark a lowered version of a high-pitched syllable.

- ἔστι τι καλόν. /és.ti.ti.ka.lón/ ('there is something beautiful') (καλόν is at the end of the sentence)
  καλόν ἐστι. /ka.ló.nes.ti/ ('it is beautiful') (ἐστι here is an enclitic)
  καλὸν καὶ ἀγαθόν /ka.lón.kai.a.ɡa.tʰón/ ('good and beautiful')

== Sound changes ==
Greek underwent many sound changes. Some occurred between Proto-Indo-European (PIE) and Proto-Greek (PGr), some between the Mycenaean Greek and Ancient Greek periods, which are separated by about 300 years (the Greek Dark Ages), and some during the Koine Greek period. Some sound changes occurred only in particular Ancient Greek dialects, not in others, and certain dialects, such as Boeotian and Laconian, underwent sound changes similar to the ones that occurred later in Koine. This section primarily describes sound changes that occurred between the Mycenaean and Ancient Greek periods and during the Ancient Greek period.

For sound changes occurring in Proto-Greek and in Koine Greek, see Proto-Greek language § Phonology and Koine Greek phonology.

=== Debuccalization ===
In Proto-Greek, the PIE sibilant *s became /h/ by debuccalization in many cases.

- PIE *so, seh₂ > ὁ, ἡ /ho hɛː/ ('the') (m f) — compare Sanskrit sá sā́

PIE *septḿ̥ > ἑπτά /hep.tá/ ('seven') — compare Latin septem, Sanskrit sapta

Clusters of *s and a sonorant (liquid or nasal) at the beginning of a word became a voiceless resonant in some forms of Archaic Greek. Voiceless [r̥] remained in Attic at the beginning of words, and became the regular allophone of /r/ in this position; voiceless /ʍ/ merged with /h/; and the rest of the voiceless resonants merged with the voiced resonants.

- PIE *srew- > ῥέϝω > Attic ῥέω /r̥é.ɔː/ ('flow') — compare Sanskrit srávanti (3rd pl)

PIE *sroweh₂ > Corfu ΡΗΟϜΑΙΣΙ /r̥owaisi/ (dat pl), Attic ῥοή [r̥o.ɛ̌ː] ('stream')

- PIE *swe > Pamphylian ϜΗΕ /ʍe/, Attic ἕ /hé/ (refl pron)
- PIE *slagʷ- > Corfu ΛΗΑΒΩΝ /l̥aboːn/, Attic λαβών /la.bɔ̌ːn/ ('taking') (aor ppl)

PIE *s remained in clusters with stops and at the end of a word:

- PIE *h₁esti > ἐστί /es.tí/ ('is') — compare Sanskrit ásti, Latin est

PIE *seǵʰ-s- > ἕξω /hék.sɔː/ ('I will have')
PIE *ǵenH₁os > γένος /ɡénos/ ('kind') — compare Sanskrit jánas, Latin genus

The PIE semivowel *y, IPA /j/, was sometimes debuccalized and sometimes strengthened initially. How this development was conditioned is unclear; the involvement of the laryngeals has been suggested. In certain other positions, it was kept, and frequently underwent other sound changes:

- PIE *yos, yeH₂ > ὅς, ἥ [hós hɛ̌ː] ('who') (rel pron) — compare Sanskrit yás, yā́
- PIE *yugóm > early /dzu.ɡón/ > Attic ζυγόν /sdy.ɡón/ ('yoke') — compare Sanskrit yugá, Latin jugum
- *mor-ya > Proto-Greek *móřřā > μοῖρα /mói.ra/ ('part') (compare μόρος)

Between vowels, *s became /h/. Intervocalic /h/ probably occurred in Mycenaean. In most cases it was lost by the time of Ancient Greek. In a few cases, it was transposed to the beginning of the word. Later, initial /h/ was lost by psilosis.

- PIE *ǵénh₁es-os > PGr *genehos > Ionic γένεος /ɡé.ne.os/ > Attic γένους ('of a race') /ɡé.nuːs/ (contraction; gen. of γένος)
- Mycenaean pa-we-a₂, possibly *φᾱ́ρϝεἁ /pʰǎːr.we.ha/ > Ionic φᾱ́ρεα /pʰǎː.re.a/ > Attic φᾱ́ρη /pʰǎː.rɛː/ ('pieces of cloth')
- PIE *(H₁)éwsoH₂ > Proto-Greek *éuhō > εὕω /heǔ.ɔː/ ('singe')

By morphological leveling, intervocalic /s/ was kept in certain noun and verb forms: for instance, the /s/ marking the stems for the future and aorist tenses.

- λύω, λύσω, ἔλυσα /lyý.ɔː lyý.sɔː é.lyy.sa/ ('I release, I will release, I released')

=== Grassmann's law ===
Through Grassmann's law, an aspirated consonant loses its aspiration when followed by another aspirated consonant in the next syllable; this law also affects /h/ resulting from debuccalization of *s; for example:

- PIE *dʰéh₁- > ἔθην /étʰɛːn/ ('I placed') (aor)

*dʰí-dʰeh₁- > τίθημι /tí.tʰɛː.mi/ ('I place') (pres)
*dʰé-dʰeh₁- > τέθηκα /té.tʰɛː.ka/ ('I have placed') (perf)

- *tʰrikʰ-s > θρίξ /tʰríks/ ('hair') (nom sg)

*tʰrikʰ-es > τρίχες /trí.kʰes/ ('hairs') (nom. pl)

- PIE *seǵʰ-s- > ἕξω /hé.ksɔː/ ('I will have') (fut)

*seǵʰ- > ἔχω /é.kʰɔː/ ('I have') (pres)

=== Palatalization ===
In some cases, the sound ⟨ττ⟩ /tː/ in Attic corresponds to the sound ⟨σσ⟩ /sː/ in other dialects. These sounds developed from palatalization of κ, χ, and sometimes τ, θ, and γ before the pre-Greek semivowel /j/. This sound was likely pronounced as an affricate [ts] or [tʃ] earlier in the history of Greek, but inscriptions do not show the spelling ⟨τσ⟩, which suggests that an affricate pronunciation did not occur in the Classical period.

- **ēk-yōn > *ētsōn > ἥσσων, Attic ἥττων ('weaker') — compare ἦκα ('softly')
- PIE *teh₂g-yoh₂ > *tag-yō > *tatsō > τάσσω, Attic τάττω ('I arrange') — compare ταγή ('battle line') and Latin tangō
- PIE *glōgʰ-yeh₂ > *glōkh-ya > *glōtsa > γλῶσσα, Attic γλῶττα ('tongue') — compare γλωχίν ('point')

=== Loss of labiovelars ===
Mycenaean Greek had three labialized velar stops /kʷʰ kʷ ɡʷ/, aspirated, tenuis, and voiced. These derived from PIE labiovelars and from sequences of a velar and /w/, and were similar to the three regular velars of Ancient Greek /kʰ k ɡ/, except with added lip-rounding. They were written all using the same symbols in Linear B, and are transcribed as q.

In Ancient Greek, all labialized velars merged with other stops: labials /pʰ p b/, dentals /tʰ t d/, and velars /kʰ k ɡ/. Which one they became depended on dialect and phonological environment. Because of this, certain words that originally had labialized velars have different stops depending on dialect, and certain words from the same root have different stops even in the same Ancient Greek dialect.

- PIE, PGr *kʷis, kʷid > Attic τίς, τί, Thessalian Doric κίς, κί ('who?, what?') — compare Latin quis, quid

PIE, PGr *kʷo-yos > Attic ποῖος, Ionic κοῖος ('what kind?')

- PIE *gʷʰen-yō > PGr *kʷʰenyō > Attic θείνω ('I strike')

*gʷʰón-os > PGr *kʷʰónos > Attic φόνος ('slaughtering')

- PIE *kʷey(H₁)- ('notice') > Mycenaean qe-te-o ('paid'), Ancient Greek τίνω ('pay')

τιμή ('honor')
ποινή ('penalty') > Latin poena)

Near /u uː/ or /w/, the labialized velars had already lost their labialization in the Mycenaean period.

- PG *gʷow-kʷolos > Mycenaean qo-u-ko-ro, Ancient Greek βουκόλος ('cowherd')

Mycenaean a-pi-qo-ro, Ancient Greek ἀμφίπολος ('attendant')

=== Psilosis ===
Through psilosis ('stripping'), from the term for lack of /h/ (see below), the /h/ was lost even at the beginnings of words. This sound change did not occur in Attic until the Koine period, but occurred in East Ionic and Lesbian Aeolic, and therefore can be seen in certain Homeric forms. These dialects are called psilotic.

- Homeric ἠέλιος /ɛɛ.é.li.os/, Attic ἥλιος /hɛɛ́.li.os/ ('sun')
- Homeric ἠώς /ɛɛ.ɔɔ́s/, Attic ἑώς /he(.)ɔɔ́s/ ('dawn')
- Homeric οὖρος [óo.ros], Attic ὅρος /hó.ros/ ('border')

Even later, during the Koine Greek period, /h/ disappeared totally from Greek and never reappeared, resulting in Modern Greek not possessing this phoneme at all, approximating it instead in foreign borrowings using /x/ or /ç/ (or /∅/).

=== Spirantization ===
The Classical Greek aspirated and voiced stops changed to voiceless and voiced fricatives during the period of Koine Greek (spirantization, a form of lenition).

Spirantization of /tʰ/ occurred earlier in Laconian Greek. Some examples are transcribed by Aristophanes and Thucydides, such as ναὶ τὼ σιώ for ναὶ τὼ θεώ ('Yes, by the two gods!') and παρσένε σιά for παρθένε θεά ("virgin goddess!') (Lysistrata 142 and 1263), σύματος for θύματος ('sacrificial victim') (Histories book 5, chapter 77). These spellings indicate that /tʰ/ was pronounced as a dental fricative [θ] or a sibilant [s], the same change that occurred later in Koine. Greek spelling, however, does not have a letter for a labial or velar fricative, so it is impossible to tell whether /pʰ kʰ/ also changed to /f x/.

=== Compensatory lengthening ===
In Attic, Ionic, and Doric, vowels were usually lengthened when a following consonant was lost. The syllable before the consonant was originally heavy, but loss of the consonant would cause it to be light. Therefore, the vowel before the consonant was lengthened, so that the syllable would continue to be heavy. This sound change is called compensatory lengthening, because the vowel length compensates for the loss of the consonant. The result of lengthening depended on dialect and time period. The table below shows all possible results:

original vowel	Greek	α	ε		ι	ο		υ
original vowel	IPA	/a/	/e/		/i/	/o/		/y/
lengthened vowel	Greek	ᾱ	η	ει	ῑ	ω	ου	ῡ
lengthened vowel	IPA	/aː/	/ɛː/	/eː/	/iː/	/ɔː/	/oː/	/yː/

Wherever the digraphs ⟨ει ου⟩ correspond to original diphthongs they are called "genuine diphthongs", in all other cases, they are called "spurious diphthongs".

=== Contraction ===
In Attic, some cases of long vowels arose through contraction of adjacent short vowels where a consonant had been lost between them. ⟨ει⟩ /eː/ came from contraction of ⟨εε⟩, and ⟨ου⟩ /oː/ from contraction of ⟨εο⟩, ⟨οε⟩, or ⟨οο⟩. ⟨ω⟩ /ɔː/ arose from ⟨αο⟩ and ⟨οα⟩, ⟨η⟩ /ɛː/ from ⟨εα⟩, and ⟨ᾱ⟩ /aː/ from ⟨αε⟩ and ⟨αα⟩. Contractions involving diphthongs ending in /i̯/ resulted in the long diphthongs /ɛːi̯ aːi̯ ɔːi̯/.

Uncontracted forms are found in other dialects, such as in Ionic.

=== Monophthongization ===
The diphthongs /ei ou/ became the long monophthongs /eː/ and /oː/ before the Classical period.

=== Vowel raising and fronting ===
In Archaic Greek, upsilon ⟨Υ⟩ represented the back vowel /u uː/. In Attic and Ionic, this vowel was fronted around the 7th or 6th century BC. It likely first became central [ʉ ʉː], and then the front [y yː]. For example, the onomatopoietic verb μυκάομαι ("to moo") was archaically pronounced /muːkáomai̯/, but had become /myːkáomai̯/ in 5th century Attic.

During the Classical period, /oː/ – classically spelled ⟨ΟΥ⟩ – was raised to [uː], and thus took up the empty space of the earlier /uː/ phoneme. The fact that ⟨υ⟩ was never confused with ⟨ου⟩ indicates that ⟨υ⟩ was fronted before ⟨ου⟩ was raised.

In late Classical Greek, /eː/ was raised and merged with original /iː/.

=== Attic–Ionic vowel shift ===
In Attic and Ionic, the Proto-Greek long /aː/ shifted to /ɛː/. This shift did not happen in the other dialects. Thus, some cases of Attic and Ionic η correspond to Doric and Aeolic ᾱ, and other cases correspond to Doric and Aeolic η.

- Doric and Aeolic μᾱ́τηρ, Attic and Ionic μήτηρ [mǎː.tɛːr mɛ̌ːtɛːr] ('mother') — compare Latin māter

The vowel first shifted to /æː/, at which point it was distinct from Proto-Greek long /eː/, and then later /æː/ and /eː/ merged as /ɛː/. This is indicated by inscriptions in the Cyclades, which write Proto-Greek /eː/ as ⟨Ε⟩, but the shifted /æː/ as ⟨Η⟩ and new /aː/ from compensatory lengthening as ⟨Α⟩.

In Attic, both /æː/ and Proto-Greek /eː/ were written as ⟨Η⟩, but they merged to /ɛː/ at the end of the 5th century BC. At this point, nouns in the masculine first declension were confused with third-declension nouns with stems in /es/. The first-declension nouns had /ɛː/ resulting from original /aː/, while the third-declension nouns had /ɛː/ resulting from contraction of /ea/.

- Αἰσχίνης Aeschines (1st decl)

Αἰσχίνου (gen sg)

incorrect 3rd decl gen sg Αἰσχίνους

Αἰσχίνην (acc sg)

- Ἱπποκράτης Hippocrates (3rd decl)

Ἱπποκράτους (gen sg)
Ἱπποκράτη (acc sg)

incorrect 1st decl acc sg Ἱπποκράτην

In addition, words that had original η in both Attic and Doric were given false Doric forms with ᾱ in the choral passages of Athenian plays, indicating that Athenians could not distinguish the Attic-Ionic shifted ᾱ from original Proto-Greek η.

- Attic and Doric πηδός ('blade of an oar')

incorrect Doric form πᾱδός

In Attic, /aː/ rather than /εː/ is found immediately after /e i r/, except in certain cases where the sound ϝ /w/ formerly came between the /e i r/ and the /aː/ (see above).

- Doric ᾱ̔μέρᾱ, Attic ἡμέρᾱ, Ionic ἡμέρη /haː.mé.raː hɛː.mé.raː hɛː.mé.rɛː/ ('day')
- Attic οἵᾱ, Ionic οἵη [hoǰ.jaː hoǰ.jɛː] ('such as') (fem nom sg)
- Attic νέᾱ, Ionic νέη /né.aː né.ɛː/ ('new') (fem nom sg) < νέϝος
- But Attic κόρη, Ionic κούρη, Doric κόρᾱ and κώρᾱ ('young girl') < κόρϝᾱ (as also in Arcadocypriot)

The fact that /aː/ is found instead of /εː/ may indicate that earlier, the vowel shifted to /ɛː/ in all cases, but then shifted back to /aː/ after /e i r/ (reversion), or that the vowel never shifted at all in these cases. Sihler says that Attic /aː/ is from reversion.

This shift did not affect cases of long /aː/ that developed from the contraction of certain sequences of vowels that contain α. Thus, the vowels /aː/ and /aːi̯/ are common in verbs with a-contracted present and imperfect forms, such as ὁράω "see". The examples below are shown with the hypothetical original forms from which they were contracted.

- infinitive: ὁρᾶν /ho.râːn/ "to see" < *ὁράεεν /ho.rá.e.en/
- third person singular present indicative active: ὁρᾷ /ho.râːi̯/ "he sees" < *ὁράει */ho.rá.ei/
- third person singular imperfect indicative active: ὥρᾱ /hɔ̌ː.raː/ "he saw" < *ὥραε */hǒː.ra.e/

Also unaffected was long /aː/ that arose by compensatory lengthening of short /a/. Thus, Attic and Ionic had a contrast between the feminine genitive singular ταύτης /taú.tɛːs/ and feminine accusative plural ταύτᾱς /taú.taːs/, forms of the adjective and pronoun οὗτος "this, that". The first derived from an original *tautās with shifting of ā to ē, the other from *tautans with compensatory lengthening of ans to ās.

=== Assimilation ===
When one consonant comes next to another in verb or noun conjugation or word derivation, various sandhi rules apply. When these rules affect the forms of nouns and adjectives or of compound words, they are reflected in spelling. Between words, the same rules also applied, but they are not reflected in standard spelling, only in inscriptions.

Rules:

- Most basic rule: When two sounds appear next to each other, the first assimilates in voicing and aspiration to the second.
  - This applies fully to stops. Fricatives assimilate only in voicing, sonorants do not assimilate.
- Before an /s/ (future, aorist stem), velars become [k], labials become [p], and dentals disappear.
- Before a /tʰ/ (aorist passive stem), velars become [kʰ], labials become [pʰ], and dentals become [s].
- Before an /m/ (perfect middle first-singular, first-plural, participle), velars become [ɡ], nasal+velar becomes [ɡ], labials become [m], dentals become [s], other sonorants remain the same.

first sound	second sound	resulting cluster	examples	notes
/p, b, pʰ/	/s/	/ps/	πέμπω, πέμψω, ἔπεμψα; Κύκλωψ, Κύκλωπος	future and first aorist stems; nominative singular and dative plural of third-declension nominals
/k, ɡ, kʰ/	/s/	/ks/	ἄγω, ἄξω; φύλαξ, φύλακος	future and first aorist stems; nominative singular and dative plural of third-declension nominals
/t, d, tʰ/	/s/	/s/	ἐλπίς, ἐλπίδος; πείθω, πείσω, ἔπεισα	future and first aorist stems; nominative singular and dative plural of third-declension nominals
/p, b, pʰ/	/tʰ/	/pʰtʰ/	ἐπέμφθην	first aorist passive stem
/k, ɡ, kʰ/	/tʰ/	/kʰtʰ/	ἤχθην	first aorist passive stem
/t, d, tʰ/	/tʰ/	/stʰ/	ἐπείσθην	first aorist passive stem
/p, b, pʰ/	/m/	/mm/	πέπεμμαι	1st singular and plural of the perfect mediopassive
/k, ɡ, kʰ/	/m/	/ɡm/ [ŋm]	ἦγμαι	1st singular and plural of the perfect mediopassive
/t, d, tʰ/	/m/	/sm/ [zm]	πέπεισμαι	1st singular and plural of the perfect mediopassive

The alveolar nasal /n/ assimilates in place of articulation, changing to a labial or velar nasal before labials or velars:

- μ [m] before the labials /b/, /p/, /pʰ/, /m/ (and the cluster /ps/):

ἐν- + βαίνω > ἐμβαίνω; ἐν- + πάθεια > ἐμπάθεια; ἐν- + φαίνω > ἐμφαίνω; ἐν- + μένω > ἐμμένω; ἐν- + ψυχή + -ος > ἔμψυχος;

- γ [ŋ] before the velars /ɡ/, /k/, /kʰ/ (and the cluster /ks/):

ἐν- + γίγνομαι > ἐγγίγνομαι; ἐν- + καλέω > ἐγκαλέω; ἐν- + χέω > ἐγχέω; συν- + ξηραίνω > συγξηραίνω

When /n/ precedes /l/ or /r/, the first consonant assimilates to the second, gemination takes place, and the combination is pronounced [lː], as in ⟨συλλαμβάνω⟩ from underlying *συνλαμβάνω, or [r̥ː], as in ⟨συρρέω⟩ from underlying *συνρέω.

The sound of zeta ⟨ζ⟩ develops from original *sd in some cases, and in other cases from *y dy gy. In the second case, it was likely first pronounced [dʒ] or [dz], and this cluster underwent metathesis early in the Ancient Greek period. Metathesis is likely in this case; clusters of a voiced stop and /s/, like /bs ɡs/, do not occur in Ancient Greek, since they change to /ps ks/ by assimilation (see below), while clusters with the opposite order, like /sb sɡ/, pronounced [zb zɡ], do occur.

- Ἀθήναζε ('to Athens') < Ἀθήνᾱσ-δε
- ἵζω ('set') < Proto-Indo-European *si-sdō (Latin sīdō: reduplicated present), from zero-grade of the root of ἕδος < *sedos "seat"
- πεζός ('on foot') < PGr *ped-yos, from the root of πούς, ποδός "foot"
- ἅζομαι ('revere') < PGr *hag-yomai, from the root of ἅγ-ιος ('holy')

== Terminology ==
Ancient grammarians, such as Aristotle in his Poetics and Dionysius Thrax in his Art of Grammar, categorized letters (γράμματα) according to what speech sounds (στοιχεῖα 'elements') they represented. They called the letters for vowels φωνήεντα ('pronounceable', singular φωνῆεν); the letters for the nasals, liquids, and /s/, and the letters for the consonant clusters /ps ks sd/ ἡμίφωνα ('half-sounding', singular ἡμίφωνον); and the letters for the stops ἄφωνα ('not-sounding', singular ἄφωνον). Dionysius also called consonants in general σύμφωνα ('pronounced with [a vowel]', σύμφωνον).

All the Greek terms for letters or sounds are nominalized adjectives in the neuter gender, to agree with the neuter nouns στοιχεῖον and γράμμα, since they were used to modify the nouns, as in φωνῆεν στοιχεῖον ('pronounceable element') or ἄφωνα γράμματα ('unpronounceable letters'). Many also use the root of the deverbal noun φωνή ('voice, sound').

The words φωνῆεν, σύμφωνον, ἡμίφωνον, ἄφωνον were loan-translated into Latin as vōcālis, cōnsōnāns, semivocālis, mūta. The Latin words are feminine because the Latin noun littera ('letter') is feminine. They were later borrowed into English as vowel, consonant, semivowel, mute.

The categories of vowel letters were δίχρονα, βραχέα, μακρά ('two-time, short, long'). These adjectives describe whether the vowel letters represented both long and short vowels, only short vowels or only long vowels. Additionally, vowels that ordinarily functioned as the first and second elements of diphthongs were called προτακτικά ('prefixable') and ὑποτακτικά ('suffixable'). The category of δίφθογγοι included both diphthongs and the spurious diphthongs ει ου, which were pronounced as long vowels in the Classical period.

The categories ἡμίφωνα and ἄφωνα roughly correspond to the modern terms continuant and stop. Greek grammarians placed the letters ⟨β δ γ φ θ χ⟩ in the category of stops, not of continuants, indicating that they represented stops in Ancient Greek, rather than fricatives, as in Modern Greek.

Stops were divided into three categories using the adjectives δασέα ('thick'), ψιλά ('thin'), and μέσα ('middle'), as shown in the table below. The first two terms indicate a binary opposition typical of Greek thought: they referred to stops with and without aspiration. The voiced stops did not fit in either category and so they were called "middle". The concepts of voice and voicelessness (presence or absence of vibration of the vocal folds) were unknown to the Greeks and were not developed in the Western grammatical tradition until the 19th century, when the Sanskrit grammatical tradition began to be studied by Westerners.

The glottal fricative /h/ was originally called πνεῦμα ('breath'), and it was classified as a προσῳδία, the category to which the acute, grave, and circumflex accents also belong. Later, a diacritic for the sound was created, and it was called pleonastically πνεῦμα δασύ ('rough breathing'). Finally, a diacritic representing the absence of /h/ was created, and it was called πνεῦμα ψιλόν ('smooth breathing'). The diacritics were also called προσῳδία δασεῖα and προσῳδία ψιλή ('thick accent' and 'thin accent'), from which come the Modern Greek nouns δασεία and ψιλή.

Greek terms			Greek letters	IPA	phonetic description
φωνήεντα	βραχέα		⟨ε ο⟩	/e o/	short vowels
φωνήεντα	μακρά		⟨η ω⟩	/ɛː ɔː/	long vowels
φωνήεντα	δίχρονα		⟨α ι υ⟩	/a(ː) i(ː) y(ː)/	short or long vowels
φωνήεντα	προτακτικά		⟨ᾰ◌ ᾱ◌ ε◌ η◌ ο◌ υ◌ ω◌⟩	/a- aː- e- ɛː- o- y- ɔː-/	first elements of diphthongs
φωνήεντα	ὑποτακτικά		⟨◌ι ◌ͅ ◌υ⟩	/-i̯ -i̯ -u̯/	second elements of diphthongs
φωνήεντα	δίφθογγοι		⟨αι ᾰυ ει ευ οι ου υι⟩	/ai̯ au̯ eː eu̯ oi̯ uː yː/	short diphthongs and long vowel digraphs
φωνήεντα	δίφθογγοι		⟨ᾳ ᾱυ ῃ ηυ ῳ ωυ⟩	/aːi̯ aːu̯ ɛːi̯ ɛːu̯ ɔːi̯ ɔːu̯/	long diphthongs
σύμφωνα	ἡμίφωνα	διπλᾶ	⟨ζ ξ ψ⟩	/sd ks ps/	consonant clusters with /s/
σύμφωνα	ἡμίφωνα	ὑγρά	⟨λ μ ν ρ⟩	/l m n r/	sonorant consonants
σύμφωνα	ἡμίφωνα		⟨σ⟩	/s/	fricative
σύμφωνα	ἄφωνα	ψιλά	⟨κ π τ⟩	/k p t/	tenuis stops
σύμφωνα	ἄφωνα	μέσα	⟨β γ δ⟩	/b ɡ d/	voiced stops
σύμφωνα	ἄφωνα	δασέα	⟨θ φ χ⟩	/tʰ pʰ kʰ/	aspirated stops
προσῳδίαι		τόνοι	⟨ᾰ́ ᾱ́ ᾰ̀ ᾱ̀ ᾶ⟩	/á ǎː a aː âː/	pitch accent
προσῳδίαι		πνεύματα	⟨ἁ ἀ⟩	/ha a/	voiceless glottal fricative

== Reconstruction ==
The above information is based on a large body of evidence which was discussed extensively by linguists and philologists of the 19th and 20th centuries. The following section provides a short summary of the kinds of evidence and arguments that have been used in this debate, and gives some hints as to the sources of uncertainty that still prevails with respect to some details.

=== Internal evidence ===
==== Evidence from spelling ====
Whenever a new set of written symbols, such as an alphabet, is created for a language, the written symbols typically correspond to the spoken sounds, and the spelling or orthography is therefore phonemic or transparent: It is easy to pronounce a word by seeing how it is spelled, and conversely to spell a word by knowing how it is pronounced. Until the pronunciation of the language changes, spelling mistakes do not occur since spelling and pronunciation match each other.

When the pronunciation changes, there are two options. The first is spelling reform: The spelling of words is changed to reflect the new pronunciation. In this case, the date of a spelling reform generally indicates the approximate time when the pronunciation changed.

The second option is that the spelling remains the same despite the changes in pronunciation. In this case, the spelling system is called conservative or historical since it reflects the pronunciation in an earlier period of the language. It is also called opaque because there is not a simple correspondence between written symbols and spoken sounds: The spelling of words becomes an increasingly unreliable indication of their contemporary pronunciation, and knowing how to pronounce a word provides increasingly insufficient and misleading information on how to spell it.

In a language with a historical spelling system, spelling mistakes indicate changes in pronunciation. Writers with incomplete knowledge of the spelling system misspell words, and in general their misspellings reflect the way they pronounce the words.

- If scribes very often confuse two letters, this implies that the sounds denoted by the two letters are the same, that the sounds have merged. This happened early with ⟨ι ει⟩. A little later, it happened with ⟨υ οι⟩, ⟨ο ω⟩, and ⟨ε αι⟩. Later still, ⟨η⟩ was confused with the already merged ⟨ι ει⟩.
- If scribes omit a letter where it would usually be written, or insert it where it does not belong (hypercorrection), this implies that the sound that the letter represented has been lost in speech. This happened early with word-initial rough breathing (/h/) in most forms of Greek. Another example is the occasional omission of the iota subscript of long diphthongs (see above).

Spelling mistakes provide limited evidence: they only indicate the pronunciation of the scribe who made the spelling mistake, not the pronunciation of all speakers of the language at the time. Ancient Greek was a language with many regional variants and social registers. Many of the pronunciation changes of Koine Greek probably occurred earlier in some regional pronunciations and sociolects of Attic even in the Classical Age, but the older pronunciations were preserved in more learned speech.

==== Onomatopoeic words ====
Greek literature sometimes contains representations of animal cries in Greek letters. The most often quoted example is βῆ βῆ, used to render the cry of sheep, and is used as evidence that beta had a voiced bilabial plosive pronunciation and eta was a long open-mid front vowel. Onomatopoeic verbs such as μυκάομαι for the lowing of cattle (cf. Latin mugire), βρυχάομαι for the roaring of lions (cf. Latin rugire) and κόκκυξ as the name of the cuckoo (cf. Latin cuculus) suggest an archaic [uː] pronunciation of long upsilon, before this vowel was fronted to [yː].

==== Morpho-phonological facts ====
Sounds undergo regular changes, such as assimilation or dissimilation, in certain environments within words, which are sometimes indicated in writing. These can be used to reconstruct the nature of the sounds involved.

- ⟨π, τ, κ⟩ at the end of some words are regularly changed to ⟨φ, θ, χ⟩ when preceding a rough breathing in the next word. Thus, e.g.: ἐφ' ἁλός for ἐπὶ ἁλός or καθ' ἡμᾶς for κατὰ ἡμᾶς.
- ⟨π, τ, κ⟩ at the end of the first member of composite words are regularly changed to ⟨φ, θ, χ⟩ when preceding a spiritus asper in the next member of the composite word. Thus e.g.: ἔφιππος, καθάπτω
- The Attic dialect in particular is marked by contractions: two vowels without an intervening consonant were merged in a single syllable; for instance uncontracted (disyllabic) ⟨εα⟩ ([e.a]) occurs regularly in dialects but contracts to ⟨η⟩ in Attic, supporting the view that η was pronounced [ɛː] (intermediate between [e] and [a]) rather than [i] as in Modern Greek. Similarly, uncontracted ⟨εε⟩, ⟨οο⟩ ([e.e], [o.o]) occur regularly in Ionic but contract to ⟨ει⟩ and ⟨ου⟩ in Attic, suggesting [eː], [oː] values for the spurious diphthongs ⟨ει⟩ and ⟨ου⟩ in Attic as opposed to the [i] and [u] sounds they later acquired.

==== Non-standard spellings ====
Morphophonological alternations like the above are often treated differently in non-standard spellings than in standardised literary spelling. This may lead to doubts about the representativeness of the literary dialect and may in some cases force slightly different reconstructions than if one were only to take the literary texts of the high standard language into account. Thus, e.g.:

- non-standard epigraphical spelling sometimes indicates assimilation of final ⟨κ⟩ to ⟨γ⟩ before voiced consonants in a following word, or of final ⟨κ⟩ to ⟨χ⟩ before aspirated sounds, in words like ἐκ.

==== Metrical evidence ====
The metres used in Classical Greek poetry are based on the patterns of light and heavy syllables, and can thus sometimes provide evidence as to the length of vowels where this is not evident from the orthography. By the 4th century AD poetry was normally written using stress-based metres, suggesting that the distinctions between long and short vowels had been lost by then, and the pitch accent had been replaced by a stress accent.

=== External evidence ===
==== Orthoepic descriptions ====
Some ancient grammarians attempt to give systematic descriptions of the sounds of the language. In other authors one can sometimes find occasional remarks about correct pronunciation of certain sounds. However, both types of evidence are often difficult to interpret, because the phonetic terminology of the time was often vague, and it is often not clear in what relation the described forms of the language stand to those which were actually spoken by different groups of the population.

Important ancient authors include:

- Dionysius Thrax
- Dionysius of Halicarnassus
- Aelius Herodianus

==== Cross-dialectal comparison ====
Sometimes the comparison of standard Attic Greek with the written forms of other Greek dialects, or the humorous renderings of dialectal speech in Attic theatrical works, can provide hints as to the phonetic value of certain spellings. An example of this treatment with Spartan Greek is given above.

==== Loanwords ====
The spelling of Greek loanwords in other languages and vice versa can provide important hints about pronunciation. However, the evidence is often difficult to interpret or indecisive. The sounds of loanwords are often not taken over identically into the receiving language. Where the receiving language lacks a sound that corresponds exactly to that of the source language, sounds are usually mapped to some other, similar sound.

In this regard, Latin is of great value to the reconstruction of ancient Greek phonology because of its close proximity to the Greek world which caused numerous Greek words to be borrowed by the Romans. At first, Greek loanwords denoting technical terms or proper names which contained the letter Φ were imported in Latin with the spelling P or PH, indicating an effort to imitate, albeit imperfectly, a sound that Latin lacked. Later on, in the 1st centuries AD, spellings with F start to appear in such loanwords, signaling the onset of the fricative pronunciation of Φ. Thus, in the 2nd century AD, Filippus replaces P(h)ilippus. At about the same time, the letter F also begins to be used as a substitute for the letter Θ, for lack of a better choice, indicating that the sound of Greek theta had become a fricative as well.

For the purpose of borrowing certain other Greek words, the Romans added the letters Y and Z to the Latin alphabet, taken directly from the Greek one. These additions are important as they show that the Romans had no symbols to represent the sounds of the letters Υ and Ζ in Greek, which means that in these cases no known sound of Latin can be used to reconstruct the Greek sounds.

Latin often wrote ⟨i u⟩ for Greek ⟨ε ο⟩. This can be explained by the fact that Latin /i u/ were pronounced as near-close [ɪ ʊ], and therefore were as similar to the Ancient Greek mid vowels /e o/ as to the Ancient Greek close vowels /i u/.

- Φιλουμένη > Philumina
- ἐμπόριον > empurium

Sanskrit, Persian, and Armenian also provide evidence.

The quality of short /a/ is shown by some transcriptions between Ancient Greek and Sanskrit. Greek short /a/ was transcribed with Sanskrit long ā, not with Sanskrit short a, which had a closer pronunciation: [ə]. Conversely, Sanskrit short a was transcribed with Greek ε.

- Gr ἀπόκλιμα [apóklima] > Skt āpoklima- [aːpoːklimə] (an astrological term)
- Skt brāhmaṇa- [bɽaːɦməɳə] > Gr ΒΡΑΜΕΝΑΙ

==== Comparison with older alphabets ====
The Greek alphabet developed from the older Phoenician alphabet. It may be assumed that the Greeks tended to assign to each Phoenician letter that Greek sound which most closely resembled the Phoenician sound. But, as with loanwords, the interpretation is not straightforward.

==== Comparison with younger/derived alphabets ====
The Greek alphabet was in turn the basis of other alphabets, notably the Etruscan and Coptic and later the Armenian, Gothic, and Cyrillic. Similar arguments can be derived in these cases as in the Phoenician-Greek case.

For example, in Cyrillic, the letter В (ve) stands for [v], confirming that beta was pronounced as a fricative by the 9th century AD, while the new letter Б (be) was invented to note the sound [b]. Conversely, in Gothic, the letter derived from beta stands for [b], so in the 4th century AD, beta may have still been a plosive in Greek although according to evidence from the Greek papyri of Egypt, beta as a stop had been generally replaced by beta as a voiced bilabial fricative [β] by the first century AD.

==== Comparison with Modern Greek ====
Any reconstruction of Ancient Greek needs to take into account how the sounds later developed towards Modern Greek, and how these changes could have occurred. In general, the changes between the reconstructed Ancient Greek and Modern Greek are assumed to be unproblematic in this respect by historical linguists, because all the relevant changes (spirantization, chain-shifts of long vowels towards [i], loss of initial [h], restructuring of vowel-length and accentuation systems, etc.) are of types that are cross-linguistically frequently attested and relatively easy to explain.

==== Comparative reconstruction of Indo-European ====
Systematic relationships between sounds in Greek and sounds in other Indo-European languages are taken as strong evidence for reconstruction by historical linguists, because such relationships indicate that these sounds may go back to an inherited sound in the proto-language.

== History of the reconstruction of ancient pronunciation ==
=== The Renaissance ===
Until the 15th century (during the time of the Byzantine Greek Empire) ancient Greek texts were pronounced exactly like contemporary Greek when they were read aloud. From about 1486, various scholars (notably Antonio of Lebrixa, Girolamo Aleandro, and Aldus Manutius) judged that this pronunciation appeared to be inconsistent with the descriptions handed down by ancient grammarians, and suggested alternative pronunciations.

Johann Reuchlin, the leading Greek scholar in the West around 1500, had taken his Greek learning from Byzantine émigré scholars, and continued to use the modern pronunciation. This pronunciation system was called into question by Desiderius Erasmus (1466–1536) who in 1528 published De recta Latini Graecique sermonis pronuntiatione dialogus, a philological treatise clothed in the form of a philosophical dialogue, in which he developed the idea of a historical reconstruction of ancient Latin and Greek pronunciation. The two models of pronunciation became soon known, after their principal proponents, as the "Reuchlinian" and the "Erasmian" system, or, after the characteristic vowel pronunciations, as the "iotacist" (or "itacist") and the "etacist" system, respectively.

Erasmus' reconstruction was based on a wide range of arguments, derived from the philological knowledge available at his time. In the main, he strove for a more regular correspondence of letters to sounds, assuming that different letters must have stood for different sounds, and same letters for same sounds. That led him, for instance, to posit that the various letters which in the iotacist system all denoted [i] must have had different values, and that ει, αι, οι, ευ, αυ, ου were all diphthongs with a closing offglide. He also insisted on taking the accounts of ancient grammarians literally, for instance where they described vowels as being distinctively long and short, or the acute and circumflex accents as being clearly distinguished by pitch contours. In addition, he drew on evidence from word correspondences between Greek and Latin as well as some other European languages. Some of his arguments in this direction are, in hindsight, mistaken, because he naturally lacked much of the knowledge developed through later linguistic work. Thus, he could not distinguish between Latin-Greek word relations based on loans (e.g. Φοῖβος — Phoebus) on the one hand, and those based on common descent from Indo-European (e.g. φώρ — fūr) on the other. He also fell victim to a few spurious relations due to mere accidental similarity (e.g. Greek θύειν 'to sacrifice' — French tuer, 'to kill'). In other areas, his arguments are of quite the same kind as those used by modern linguistics, e.g. where he argues on the basis of cross-dialectal correspondences within Greek that η must have been a rather open e-sound, close to [a].

Erasmus also took great pains to assign to the members in his reconstructed system plausible phonetic values. This was no easy task, as contemporary grammatical theory lacked the rich and precise terminology to describe such values. In order to overcome that problem, Erasmus drew upon his knowledge of the sound repertoires of contemporary living languages, for instance likening his reconstructed η to Scots a ([æ]), his reconstructed ου to Dutch ou ([oʊ]), and his reconstructed οι to French oi (at that time pronounced [oɪ]).

Erasmus assigned to the Greek consonant letters β, γ, δ the sounds of voiced plosives /b/, /ɡ/, /d/, while for the consonant letters φ, θ, and χ he advocated the use of fricatives /f/, /θ/, /x/ as in Modern Greek (arguing, however, that this type of /f/ must have been different from that denoted by Latin ⟨f⟩).

The reception of Erasmus' idea among his contemporaries was mixed. Most prominent among those scholars who resisted his move was Philipp Melanchthon, a student of Reuchlin's. Debate in humanist circles continued up into the 17th century, but the situation remained undecided for several centuries. (See Pronunciation of Ancient Greek in teaching.)

=== The 19th century ===
A renewed interest in the issues of reconstructed pronunciation arose during the 19th century. On the one hand, the new science of historical linguistics, based on the method of comparative reconstruction, took a vivid interest in Greek. It was soon established that Greek was descended in parallel with many other languages from the Indo-European proto-language. This had important consequences for how its phonological system must be reconstructed. At the same time, continued work in philology and archeology was bringing to light a growing corpus of non-standard, non-literary and non-classical Greek writings, e.g. inscriptions and later also papyri. These added considerably to what could be known about the development of the language. On the other hand, there was a revival of academic life in Greece after the establishment of the Greek state in 1830, and scholars in Greece were at first reluctant to accept the seemingly foreign idea that Greek should have been pronounced so differently from what they knew.

Comparative linguistics led to a picture of ancient Greek that more or less corroborated Erasmus' view, though with some modifications. It became clear, for instance, that the pattern of long and short vowels observed in Greek was mirrored in similar oppositions in other languages and thus had to be a common inheritance (see Ablaut); that Greek ⟨υ⟩ had to have been [u] at some stage because it regularly corresponded to [u] in all other Indo-European languages (cf. Gr. μῦς : Lat. mūs); that many instances of ⟨η⟩ had earlier been [aː] (cf. Gr. μήτηρ : Lat. māter); that Greek ⟨ου⟩ sometimes stood in words that had been lengthened from ⟨ο⟩ and therefore must have been pronounced [oː] at some stage (the same holds analogically for ⟨ε⟩ and ⟨ει⟩, which must have been [eː]), and so on. For the consonants, historical linguistics established the originally plosive nature of both the aspirates ⟨φ,θ,χ⟩ [pʰ, tʰ, kʰ] and the mediae ⟨β, δ, γ⟩ [b, d, ɡ], which were recognised to be a direct continuation of similar sounds in Indo-European (reconstructed *bʰ, *dʰ, *gʰ and *b, *d, *g). It was also recognised that the word-initial spiritus asper was most often a reflex of earlier *s (cf. Gr. ἑπτά : Lat. septem), which was believed to have been weakened to [h] in pronunciation. Work was also done reconstructing the linguistic background to the rules of ancient Greek versification, especially in Homer, which shed light on syllable structure and accent. Scholars also described and explained the regularities in the development of consonants and vowels under processes of assimilation, reduplication, compensatory lengthening etc.

Comparative linguistics could in this way establish that a certain phonology, roughly along the Erasmian model, had once existed, and that significant changes had to have occurred later, during the development towards Modern Greek. However, the comparative method had less to say about the question when these changes took place. Erasmus had been eager to find a pronunciation system that corresponded most closely to the written letters, and it was now natural to assume that the reconstructed sound system was that which was used at the time when Greek orthography was in its formative period. For a time, it was taken for granted that this pronunciation was valid for the whole period of classical literature. However, it was perfectly possible that the pronunciation of the living language had begun to move on from that reconstructed system towards that of Modern Greek, possibly already quite early during antiquity.

In this context, evidence from the non-standard inscriptions became of decisive importance. Critics of the Erasmian reconstruction drew attention to the systematic patterns of spelling mistakes made by scribes. These mistakes showed that scribes had trouble distinguishing between the orthographically correct spellings for certain words, for instance involving ⟨ι⟩, ⟨η⟩, and ⟨ει⟩. This provided evidence that these vowels had already begun to merge in the living speech of the period. While some scholars in Greece were quick to emphasise these findings in order to cast doubt on the Erasmian system as a whole, some western European scholars tended to downplay them, explaining early instances of such orthographical aberrations as either isolated exceptions or influences from non-Attic, non-standard dialects. This 19th-century debate finds its expression in the works of Jannaris (1897) and Papadimitrakopoulos (1889) on the anti-Erasmian side, and of Friedrich Blass (1870) on the pro-Erasmian side, among others.

It was not until the early 20th century and the work of G. Chatzidakis, a linguist often credited with having first introduced the methods of modern historical linguistics into the Greek academic establishment, that the validity of the comparative method and its reconstructions for Greek began to be widely accepted among Greek scholars too. The international consensus view that had been reached by the early and mid-20th century is represented in the works of Sturtevant (1940) and Allen (1987).

=== More recent developments ===
Since the 1970s and 1980s, several scholars have attempted a systematic re-evaluation of the inscriptional and papyrological evidence (Smith 1972, Teodorsson 1974, 1977, 1978; Gignac 1976; Threatte 1980, summary in Horrocks 1999). According to their results, many of the relevant phonological changes can be dated fairly early, reaching well into the classical period, and the period of the Koiné can be characterised as one of very rapid phonological change. Many of the changes in vowel quality are now dated to some time between the 5th and the 1st centuries BC, while those in the consonants are assumed to have been completed by the 4th century AD. However, there is still considerable debate over precise dating, and it is still not clear to what degree, and for how long, different pronunciation systems would have persisted side by side within the Greek speech community. The resulting majority view today is that a phonological system roughly along Erasmian lines can still be assumed to have been valid for the period of classical Attic literature, but biblical and other post-classical Koine Greek is likely to have been spoken with a pronunciation that already approached that of Modern Greek in many crucial respects.

== Bibliography ==
=== Recent literature ===
- Allen, William Sidney (1973). Accent and Rhythm: Prosodic features of Latin and Greek (3rd ed.). Cambridge University Press. ISBN 0-521-20098-9.
- Allen, William Sidney (1987) [1968]. Vox Graeca: A Guide to the Pronunciation of Classical Greek (3rd ed.). Cambridge: Cambridge University Press. ISBN 0-521-33555-8.
- Allen, William Sidney (1978) [1965]. Vox Latina—a Guide to the Pronunciation of Classical Latin (2nd ed.). Cambridge University Press. ISBN 0-521-37936-9.
- C. C. Caragounis (1995): "The error of Erasmus and un-Greek pronunciations of Greek". Filologia Neotestamentaria 8 (16).
- C. C. Caragounis (2004): Development of Greek and the New Testament, Mohr Siebeck (ISBN 3-16-148290-5).
- A.-F. Christidis ed. (2007), A History of Ancient Greek, Cambridge University Press (ISBN 0-521-83307-8): A. Malikouti-Drachmann, "The phonology of Classical Greek", 524–544; E. B. Petrounias, "The pronunciation of Ancient Greek: Evidence and hypotheses", 556–570; idem, "The pronunciation of Classical Greek", 556–570.
- Bakker, Egbert J., ed. (2010). A Companion to the Ancient Greek Language. Wiley-Blackwell. ISBN 978-1-4051-5326-3.
- Beekes, Robert (2010) [2009]. Etymological Dictionary of Greek. With the assistance of Lucien van Beek. In two volumes. Leiden, Boston. ISBN 9789004174184.
- Devine, Andrew M.; Stephens, Laurence D. (1994). The Prosody of Greek Speech. Oxford University Press. ISBN 0-19-508546-9.
- G. Horrocks (1997): Greek: A History of the Language and Its Speakers. London: Addison Wesley (ISBN 0-582-30709-0).
- F.T. Gignac (1976): A Grammar of the Greek Papyri of the Roman and Byzantine Periods. Volume 1: Phonology. Milan: Istituto Editoriale Cisalpino-La Goliardica.
- Giannakis, Georgios K.; Crespo, Emilio; Filos, Panagiotis, eds. (2017). Studies in Ancient Greek Dialects. De Gruyter. doi:10.1515/9783110532135. ISBN 978-3-11-053213-5.
  - Giannakis, Georgios K. "Introductory Remarks". In Giannakis, Crespo & Filos (2017), pp. 1–25.
  - Filos, Panagiotis. "The Dialectal Variety of Epirus". In Giannakis, Crespo & Filos (2017), pp. 215–247.
  - Hatzopoulos, Miltiades B. "Recent Research in the Ancient Macedonian Dialect: Consolidation and New Perspectives". In Giannakis, Crespo & Filos (2017), pp. 299–328.
  - Crespo, Emilio. "The Softening of Obstruent Consonants in the Macedonian Dialect". In Giannakis, Crespo & Filos (2017), pp. 329–348.
- Goldstein, David (2014). "Phonotactics". Encyclopedia of Ancient Greek Language and Linguistics. Vol. 3. Brill. pp. 96, 97 – via academia.edu.
- C. Karvounis (2008): Aussprache und Phonologie im Altgriechischen ("Pronunciation and Phonology in Ancient Greek"). Darmstadt: Wissenschaftliche Buchgesellschaft (ISBN 978-3-534-20834-0).
- M. Lejeune (1972): Phonétique historique du mycénien et du grec ancien ("Historical phonetics of Mycenean and Ancient Greek"), Paris: Librairie Klincksieck (reprint 2005, ISBN 2-252-03496-3).
- H. Rix (1992): Historische Grammatik des Griechischen. Laut- und Formenlehre ("Historical Grammar of Greek. Phonology and Morphology"), Darmstadt: Wissenschaftliche Buchgesellschaft (2nd edition, ISBN 3-534-03840-1).
- Robins, Robert Henry (1993). The Byzantine Grammarians: Their Place in History. Berlin: Mouton de Gruyter. ISBN 9783110135749 – via Google Books.
- Sihler, Andrew Littleton (1995). New Comparative Grammar of Greek and Latin. New York, Oxford: Oxford University Press. ISBN 0-19-508345-8.
- R. B. Smith (1972): Empirical evidences and theoretical interpretations of Greek phonology: Prolegomena to a theory of sound patterns in the Hellenistic Koine, Ph.D. diss. Indiana University.
- S.-T. Teodorsson (1974): The phonemic system of the Attic dialect 400-340 BC. Göteborg: Acta Universitatis Gothoburgensis (ASIN B0006CL51U).
- S.-T. Teodorsson (1977): The phonology of Ptolemaic Koine (Studia Graeca et Latina Gothoburgensia), Göteborg (ISBN 91-7346-035-4).
- S.-T. Teodorsson (1978): The phonology of Attic in the Hellenistic period (Studia Graeca et Latina Gothoburgensia), Göteborg: Acta Universitatis Gothoburgensis (ISBN 91-7346-059-1).
- L. Threatte (1980): The Grammar of Attic Inscriptions, vol. 1: Phonology, Berlin: de Gruyter (ISBN 3-11-007344-7).

=== Older literature ===
- G. Babiniotis: Ιστορική Γραμματεία της Αρχαίας Ελληνικής Γλώσσας, 1. Φωνολογία ("Historical Grammar of the Ancient Greek Language: 1. Phonology")
- F. Blass (1870): Über die Aussprache des Griechischen, Berlin: Weidmannsche Buchhandlung.
- I. Bywater, The Erasmian Pronunciation of Greek and its Precursors, Oxford: 1908. Defends Erasmus from the claim that he hastily wrote his Dialogus based on a hoax. Mentions Erasmus's predecessors Jerome Aleander, Aldus Manutius, and Antonio of Lebrixa. Short review in The Journal of Hellenic Studies 29 (1909), p. 133. JSTOR 624654.
- E. A. S. Dawes (1894): The Pronunciation of Greek aspirates, D. Nutt.
- E. M. Geldart (1870): The Modern Greek Language In Its Relation To Ancient Greek (reprint 2004, Lightning Source Inc. ISBN 1-4179-4849-3).
- G. N. Hatzidakis (1902): Ἀκαδημαϊκὰ ἀναγνώσματα: ἡ προφορὰ τῆς ἀρχαίας Ἑλληνικῆς ("Academic Studies: The pronunciation of Ancient Greek").
- Jannaris, A. (1897). An Historical Greek Grammar Chiefly of the Attic Dialect As Written and Spoken From Classical Antiquity Down to the Present Time. London: MacMillan.
- Kiparsky, Paul (1973). "The Inflectional Accent in Indo-European". Language. 49 (4). Linguistic Society of America: 794–849. doi:10.2307/412064. JSTOR 412064.
- A. Meillet (1975) Aperçu d'une histoire de la langue grecque, Paris: Librairie Klincksieck (8th edition).
- A. Meillet & J. Vendryes (1968): Traité de grammaire comparée des langues classiques, Paris: Librairie Ancienne Honoré Champion (4th edition).
- Papadimitrakopoulos, Th. (1889). Βάσανος τῶν περὶ τῆς ἑλληνικῆς προφορᾶς Ἐρασμικῶν ἀποδείξεων [Critique of the Erasmian evidence regarding Greek pronunciation]. Athens.
- E. Schwyzer (1939): Griechische Grammatik, vol. 1, Allgemeiner Teil. Lautlehre. Wortbildung. Flexion, München: C.H. Beck (repr. 1990 ISBN 3-406-01339-2).
- Smyth, Herbert Weir (1920). A Greek Grammar for Colleges. American Book Company – via Perseus Project.
- Stanford, William Bedell (1959) [1947]. "Introduction, Grammatical Introduction". Homer: Odyssey I-XII. Vol. 1 (2nd ed.). Macmillan Education Ltd. pp. IX–LXXXVI. ISBN 1-85399-502-9.
- W. B. Stanford (1967): The Sound of Greek.
- Sturtevant, E. H. (1940) [1920]. The Pronunciation of Greek and Latin (2nd ed.). Philadelphia.

==== Ancient Greek sources ====
===== Aristotle =====
Aristotle. Περὶ Ποιητικῆς [Poetics] (in Greek). section 1456b, lines 20–34 – via Wikisource.

All speech consists of these categories: element [letter], syllable, conjunction, noun, verb, inflection, phrase.

A letter is an indivisible sound — not any sound, but a sound from which a compound sound [syllable] can naturally be made, since the sounds of animals are also indivisible, and I call none of them a letter. The categories of sound are sounding [vowels], half-sounding [semivowels: fricatives and sonorants], and unsounded [silent or mute: stop].

These categories are the vowel, which has audible sound but no contact [between lips or between tongue and the inside of the mouth]; the semivowel, which has audible sound and contact (for example s and r); and the mute, which has contact and no sound by itself, becoming audible only with [letters] that have a sound (for example g and d).

[Letters] differ in the shape of the mouth and place [in the mouth], in thickness and thinness [aspiration and unaspiration], in length and shortness — and still more in sharpness and depth and middle [high and low pitch, and pitch between the two]: but theorizing about them in detail is the job of those who study [poetic] meter.

Τῆς δὲ λέξεως ἁπάσης τάδ᾽ ἐστὶ τὰ μέρη, στοιχεῖον συλλαβὴ σύνδεσμος ὄνομα ῥῆμα ἄρθρον πτῶσις λόγος.

Στοιχεῖον μὲν οὖν ἐστιν φωνὴ ἀδιαίρετος, οὐ πᾶσα δὲ ἀλλ᾽ ἐξ ἧς πέφυκε συνθετὴ γίγνεσθαι φωνή· καὶ γὰρ τῶν θηρίων εἰσὶν ἀδιαίρετοι φωναί, ὧν οὐδεμίαν λέγω στοιχεῖον. Ταύτης δὲ μέρη τό τε φωνῆεν καὶ τὸ ἡμίφωνον καὶ ἄφωνον.

Ἔστιν δὲ ταῦτα φωνῆεν μὲν <τὸ> ἄνευ προσβολῆς ἔχον φωνὴν ἀκουστήν, ἡμίφωνον δὲ τὸ μετὰ προσβολῆς ἔχον φωνὴν ἀκουστήν, οἷον τὸ Σ καὶ τὸ Ρ, ἄφωνον δὲ τὸ μετὰ προσβολῆς καθ᾽ αὑτὸ μὲν οὐδεμίαν ἔχον φωνήν, μετὰ δὲ τῶν ἐχόντων τινὰ φωνὴν γινόμενον ἀκουστόν, οἷον τὸ Γ καὶ τὸ Δ.

ταῦτα δὲ διαφέρει σχήμασίν τε τοῦ στόματος καὶ τόποις καὶ δασύτητι καὶ ψιλότητι καὶ μήκει καὶ βραχύτητι ἔτι δὲ ὀξύτητι καὶ βαρύτητι καὶ τῷ μέσῳ: περὶ ὧν καθ᾽ ἕκαστον ἐν τοῖς μετρικοῖς προσήκει θεωρεῖν.

===== Dionysius Thrax =====
Dionysius Thrax (1883). "ς´ περὶ στοιχείου" [6. On the Sound]. Ars Grammatica (Τέχνη Γραμματική) [Art of Grammar] (in Ancient Greek). B. G. Tevbner – via The Internet Archive.

There are 24 letters, from a to ō.... Letters are also called elements [of speech] because they have an order and classification.

Of these, seven are vowels: a, e, ē, i, o, y, ō. They are called vowels because they form a complete sound by themselves.

Two of the vowels are long (ē and ō), two are short (e and o), and three are two-timed (a i y). They are called two-timed since they can be lengthened and shortened.

Five are prefixable vowels: a, e, ē, o, ō. They are called prefixable because they form a complete syllable when prefixed before i and y: for instance, ai au. Two are suffixable: i and y. And y is sometimes prefixable before i, as in myia and harpyia.

Six are diphthongs: ai au ei eu oi ou.

The remaining seventeen letters are consonants [pronounced-with]: b, g, d, z, th, k, l, m, n, x, p, r, s, t, ph, kh, ps. They are called consonants because they do not have a sound on their own, but they form a complete sound when arranged with vowels.

Of these, eight are semivowels: z, x, ps, l, m, n, r, s. They are called semivowels, because, though a little weaker than the vowels, they still sound pleasant in hummings and hissings.

Nine are mutes: b, g, d, k, p, t, th, ph, kh. They are called mute, because, more than the others, they sound bad, just as we call a performer of tragedy who sounds bad voiceless. Three of these are thin (k, p, t), three are thick (th, ph, kh), and three of them are middle [intermediate] (b, g, d). They are called middle, because they are thicker than the thin [mutes], but thinner than the thick [mutes]. And b is [the mute] between p and ph, g between k and kh, and d between th and t.

The thick [mutes] alternate with the thin ones, ph with p, as in [an example from the Odyssey]; kh with k: [another example from the Odyssey]; th with t: [an example from the Iliad].

γράμματά ἐστιν εἰκοσιτέσσαρα ἀπο τοῦ α μέχρι τοῦ ω.... τὰ [γράμματα] δὲ αὐτὰ καὶ στοιχεῖα καλεῖται διὰ τὸ ἔχειν στοῖχόν τινα καὶ τάξιν.

τούτων φωνήεντα μέν ἐστιν ἑπτά· α ε η ι ο υ ω. φωνήεντα δὲ λέγεται, ὅτι φωνὴν ἀφ᾽ ἑαυτῶν ἀποτελεῖ....

τῶν δὲ φωνηέντων μακρὰ μέν ἐστι δύο, η καὶ ω, βραχέα δύο, ε καὶ ο, δίχρονα τρία, α ι υ. δίχρονα δὲ λέγεται, ἐπεὶ ἐκτείνεται καί συστέλλεται.

προτακτικὰ φωνήεντα πέντε· α ε η ο ω. προτακτικὰ δὲ λέγεται, ὅτι προτασσόμενα τοῦ ι καὶ υ συλλαβὴν ἀποτελεῖ, οἷον αι αυ. ὑποτακτικὰ δύο· ι καὶ υ. καὶ τὸ υ δὲ ἐνιότε προτακτικόν ἐστι τοῦ ι, ὡς ἐν τῶι μυῖα καὶ ἅρπυια.

δίφθογγοι δέ εἰσιν ἕξ· αι αυ ει ευ οι ου.

σύμφωνα δὲ τὰ λοιπὰ ἑπτακαίδεκα· β γ δ ζ θ κ λ μ ν ξ π ρ σ τ φ χ ψ. σύμφωνα δὲ λέγονται, ὅτι αὐτὰ μὲν καθ᾽ ἑαυτὰ φωνὴν οὐκ ἔχει, συντασσόμενα δὲ μετὰ τῶν φωνηέντων φωνὴν ἀποτελεῖ.

τούτων ἡμίφωνα μέν ἐστιν ὀκτώ· ζ ξ ψ λ μ ν ρ σ. ἡμίφωνα δὲ λέγεται, ὅτι παρ᾽ ὅσον ἧττον τῶν φωνηέντων εὔφωνα καθέστηκεν ἔν τε τοῖς μυγμοῖς καὶ σιγμοῖς.

ἄφωνα δέ ἐστιν ἐννέα· β γ δ κ π τ θ φ χ. ἄφωνα δὲ λέγεται, ὅτι μᾶλλον τῶν ἄλλων ἐστὶν κακόφωνα, ὥσπερ ἄφωνον λέγομεν τὸν τραγωιδὸν τὸν κακόφωνον. τούτων ψιλὰ μέν ἐστι τρία, κ π τ, δασέα τρία, θ φ χ, μέσα δὲ τούτων τρία, β γ δ. μέσα δὲ εἴρηται, ὅτι τῶν μὲν ψιλῶν ἐστι δασύτερα, τῶν δὲ δασέων ψιλότερα. καὶ ἔστι τὸ μὲν β μέσον τοῦ π καὶ φ, τὸ δὲ γ μέσον τοῦ κ καὶ χ, τὸ δὲ δ μέσον τοῦ θ καὶ τ.

ἀντιστοιχεῖ δὲ τὰ δασέα τοῖς ψιλοῖς, τῶι μὲν π τὸ φ, οὕτως·

- ἀλλά μοι εἴφ᾽ ὅπηι [εἰπέ ὅπῃ] ἔσχες ἰὼν εὐεργέα νῆα (Odyssey 4.279),

τῶι δὲ κ τὸ χ·

- αὐτίχ᾽ ὁ [αὐτίκα ὁ] μὲν χλαῖνάν τε χιτῶνά τε ἕννυτ᾽ Ὀδυσσεύς (Odyssey 5.229),

τὸ δὲ θ τῶι τ·

- ὣς ἔφαθ᾽· οἱ [ἔφατο οἱ] δ᾽ ἄρα πάντες ἀκὴν ἐγένοντο σιωπῆι (Iliad 4.95).

In addition, three consonants are double: z, x, ps. They are called double because each one of them is made up of two consonants: z from s and d, x from k and s, and ps from p and s.

There are four unchangeable [consonants]: l, m, n, r. They are called unchangeable because they do not change in the future [tense]s of verbs and in the declensions of nouns. They are also called liquids.

ἔτι δὲ τῶν συμφώνων διπλᾶ μέν ἐστι τρία· ζ ξ ψ. διπλᾶ δὲ εἴρηται, ὅτι ἓν ἕκαστον αὐτῶν ἐκ δύο συμφώνων σύγκειται, τὸ μὲν ζ ἐκ τοῦ σ καὶ δ, τὸ δὲ ξ ἐκ τοῦ κ καὶ σ, τὸ δὲ ψ ἐκ τοῦ π καὶ σ.

ἀμετάβολα τέσσαρα· λ μ ν ρ. ἀμετὰβολα δὲ λέγεται, ὅτι οὐ μεταβάλλει ἐν τοῖς μέλλουσι τῶν ῥημάτων οὐδὲ ἐν ταῖς κλίσεσι τῶν ὀνομάτων. τὰ δὲ αὐτὰ καὶ ὑγρὰ καλεῖται.
