= Minuscule 541 =

1400s Greek New Testament manuscript

- New Testament manuscript
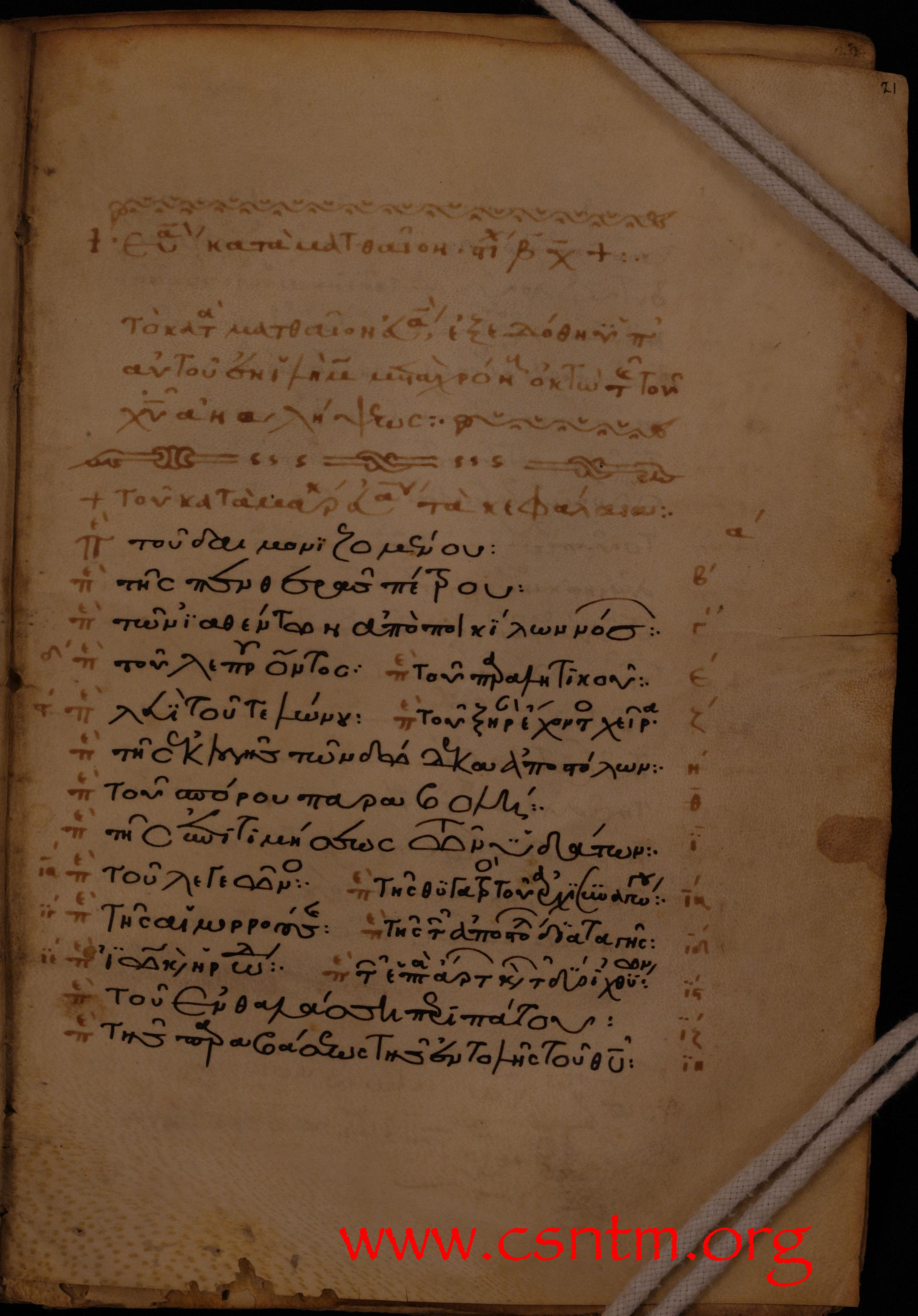
- Tables of κεφαλαια (chapters) to the Gospel of Matthew
- Text: Gospel of Matthew-Gospel of Mark †
- Date: 15th century
- Script: Greek
- Now at: University of Michigan
- Size: 21 cm by 14.2 cm
- Type: Byzantine text-type
- Category: V
- Hand: neatly written
- Note: full marginalia in bad condition

Minuscule 541 (in the Gregory-Aland numbering), 554 (in the Scrivener's numbering), ε 400 (in Soden's numbering), is a Greek minuscule manuscript of the New Testament, on a parchment. Palaeographically it has been assigned to the 15th century.

The manuscript was adapted for liturgical use. It is incomplete.

== Description ==
The codex contains some parts of the Gospel of Matthew and Gospel of Mark, on 49 parchment leaves (size 21 cm by 14.2 cm), with numerous lacunae. The text is written in one column per page, 21 lines per page. It is neatly written, but has survived in bad condition. The iota adscript does not occur.

=== Contents ===
From Matthew 18:32 – 24:10 and 26:8 – 28:20 and from Mark 1:16 – 13:9 and 14:9–26.

The text is divided according to the κεφαλαια ('chapters'), whose numbers are given at the margin, with their τιτλοι ('titles') at the top and foot of the pages. There is also a division according to the smaller Ammonian Sections, with references to the Eusebian Canons (only partially). The τιτλοι and numbers of the κεφαλαια are red in Matthew and black in Mark. The Ammonian Sections are red in Matthew, in Mark are often black. The references to the Eusebian Canons are mostly omitted.

It contains lists of the κεφαλαια ('list of contents') before each Gospel, lectionary markings at the margin (for liturgical use), subscriptions at the end of each Gospel (with numbers of στιχοι). There are many abridgements in the writing. The rubrical directions in margin are both in black and red. Some corrections seem to be written by prima manu others plainly secondary manu (Matthew 20,13.20; 21,42; 27,64; Mark 1:22; 5:19; 6:15; 10:32; 11:3).

=== Errors ===
According tο Scrivener, N εφελκυστικον occurs only seven times, a hiatus for the lack of it thrice." There are an unusual number of iotacistic errors (115 occurrences): ι for η, η for ι, ο for ω, ω for ο, η for ει, ει for η, ε for αι, αι for ε, ι for ει (only 1), ει for ι, ε for η (only 1), ου for ω, ω for ου, υ for ι, οι for ι, ει for οι (only 1), συ for σοι (2), η for υ. (Note: Another manuscript with unusual number of itacistic errors is Minuscule 543.)

There are many omissions by homoioteleuton (Matthew 21:32; 22:2.3; 23:3.12; Mark 2:22; 4:24; 7:20; 8:11.37; 9:5; 10:19.32; 11:15.28).

== Text ==
The Greek text of the codex is a representative of the Byzantine text-type. Aland placed it in Category V.

It has some corrections – by erasure – made both by the first hand and later.

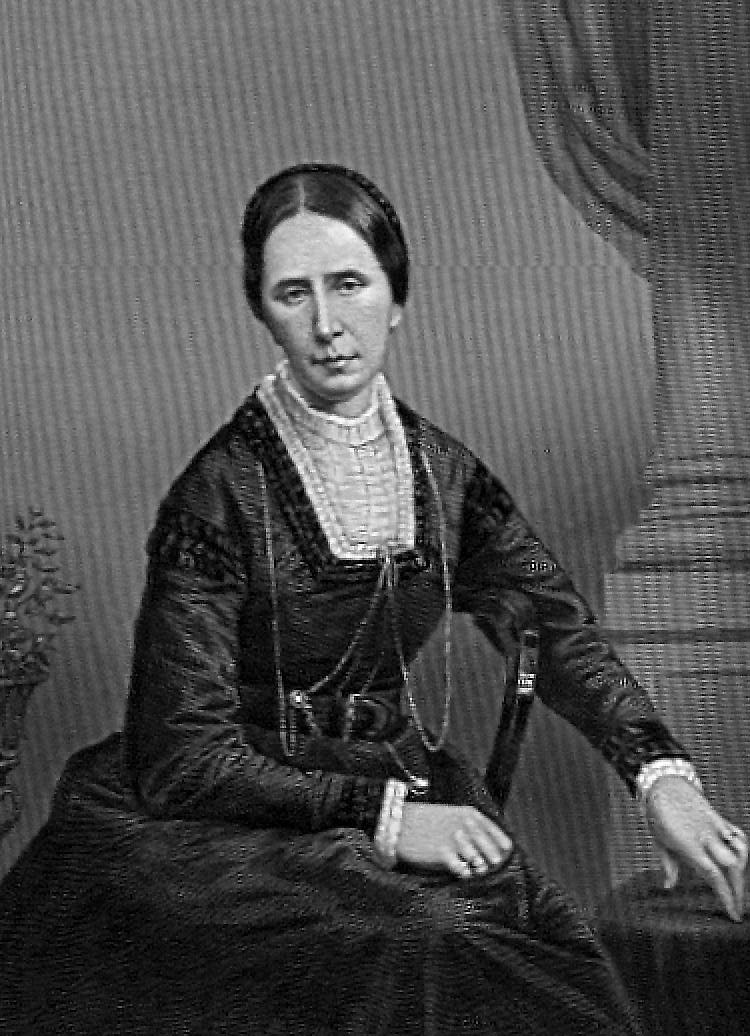
The Lady Burdett-Coutts

== History ==
The manuscript is dated, probably by the first hand, to the year 1323, but dated by paleographers to the 15th century.

In 1864 the manuscript was purchased from a dealer at Janina in Epeiros, by Baroness Burdett-Coutts (1814–1906), a philanthropist, together with other Greek manuscripts (among them codices 532-546). They were transported to England in 1870–1871.

The manuscript was presented by Burdett-Coutts to Sir Roger Cholmely's School, and was housed at the Highgate (Burdett-Coutts II. 26. 2), in London. It was examined and collated by Scrivener in his Adversaria critica sacra (1893).

It was added to the list of the New Testament manuscripts by F. H. A. Scrivener and C. R. Gregory. Gregory saw it in 1883.

In 1922 it was acquired for the University of Michigan.

It is currently housed at the University of Michigan (Ms. Inv. No. 23b) in Ann Arbor.

== Images ==
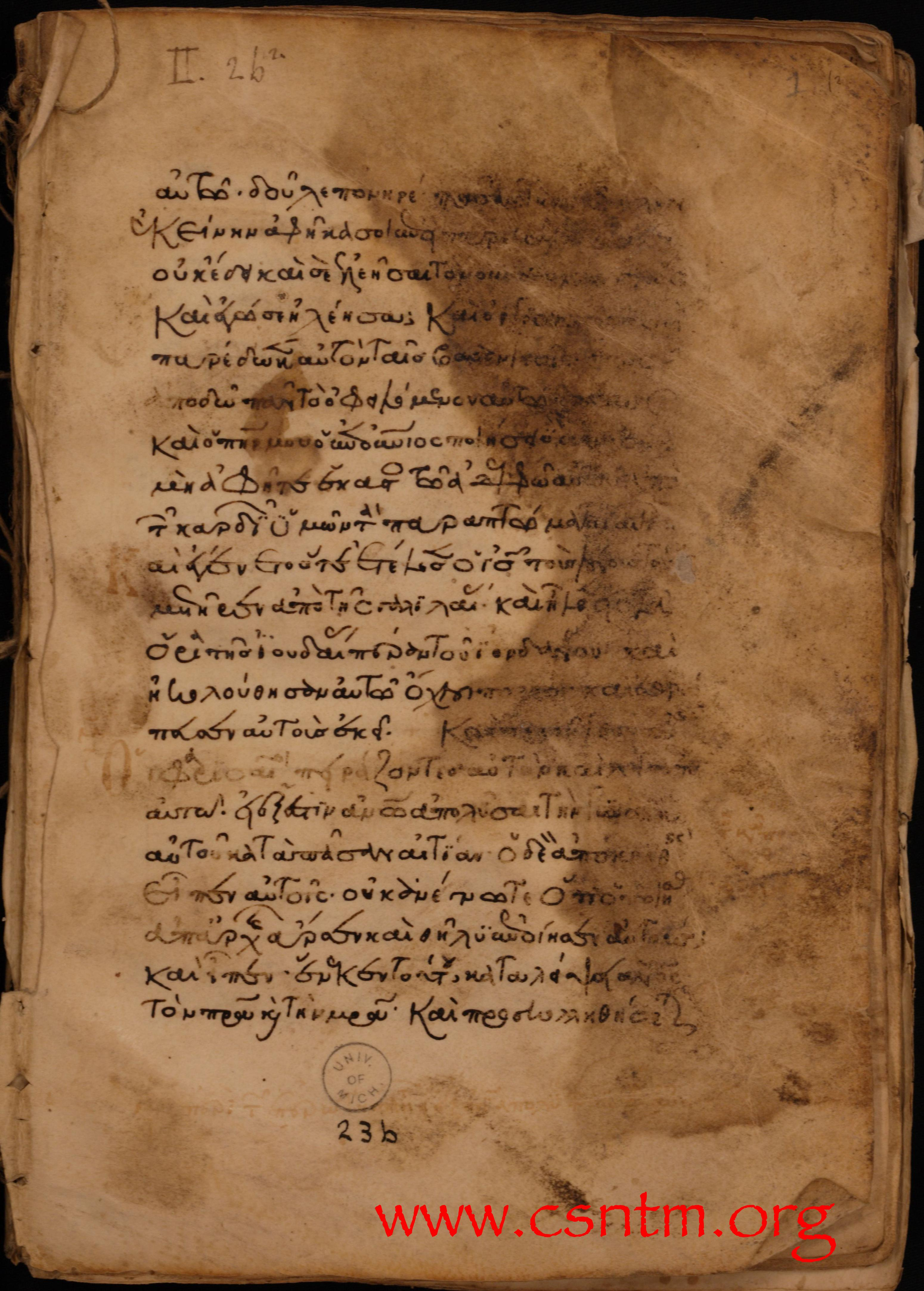
Matthew 18:32-19:5; the page was partially damaged by water

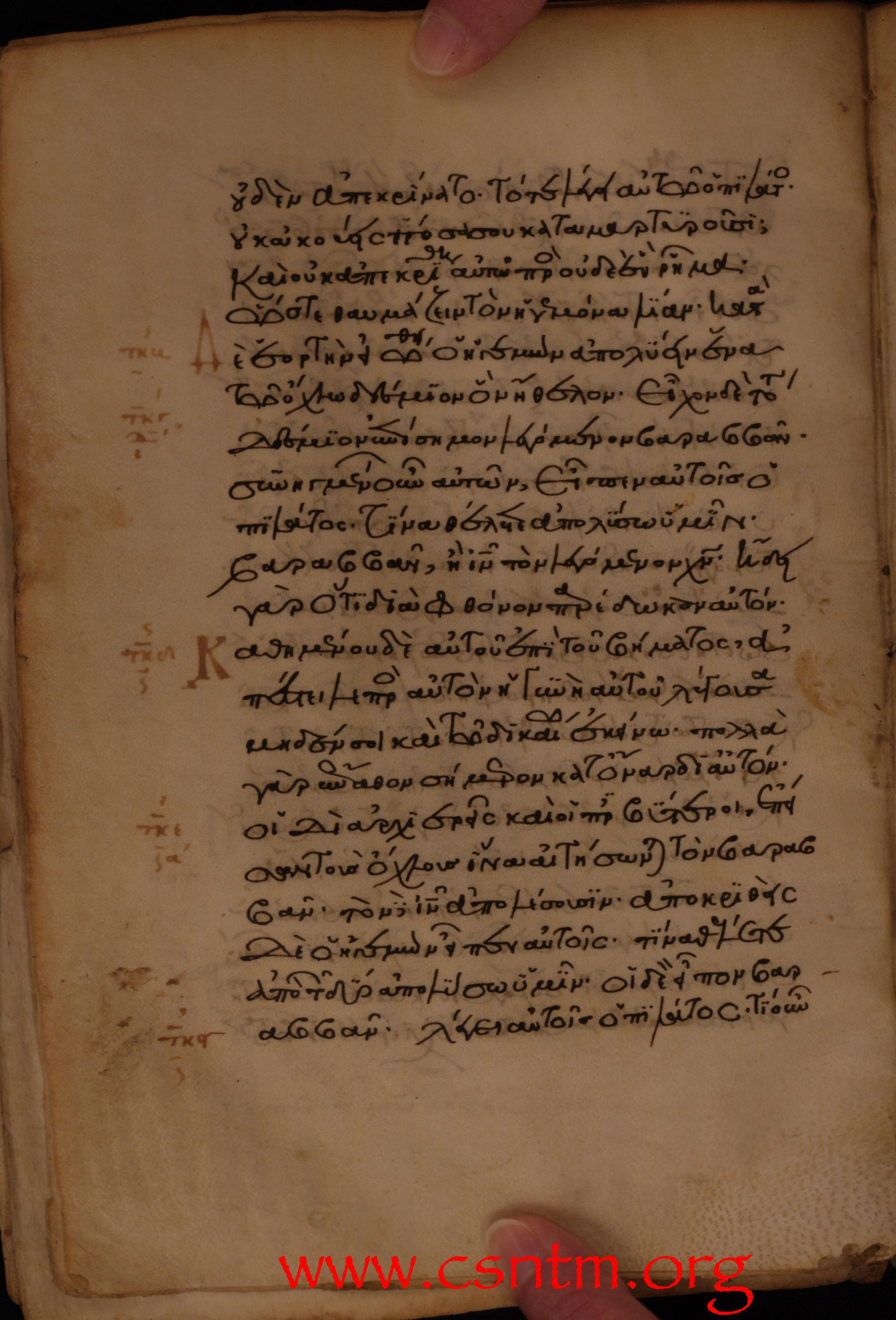
Initials in red, the Ammonian Sections and the Eusebian Canons in red

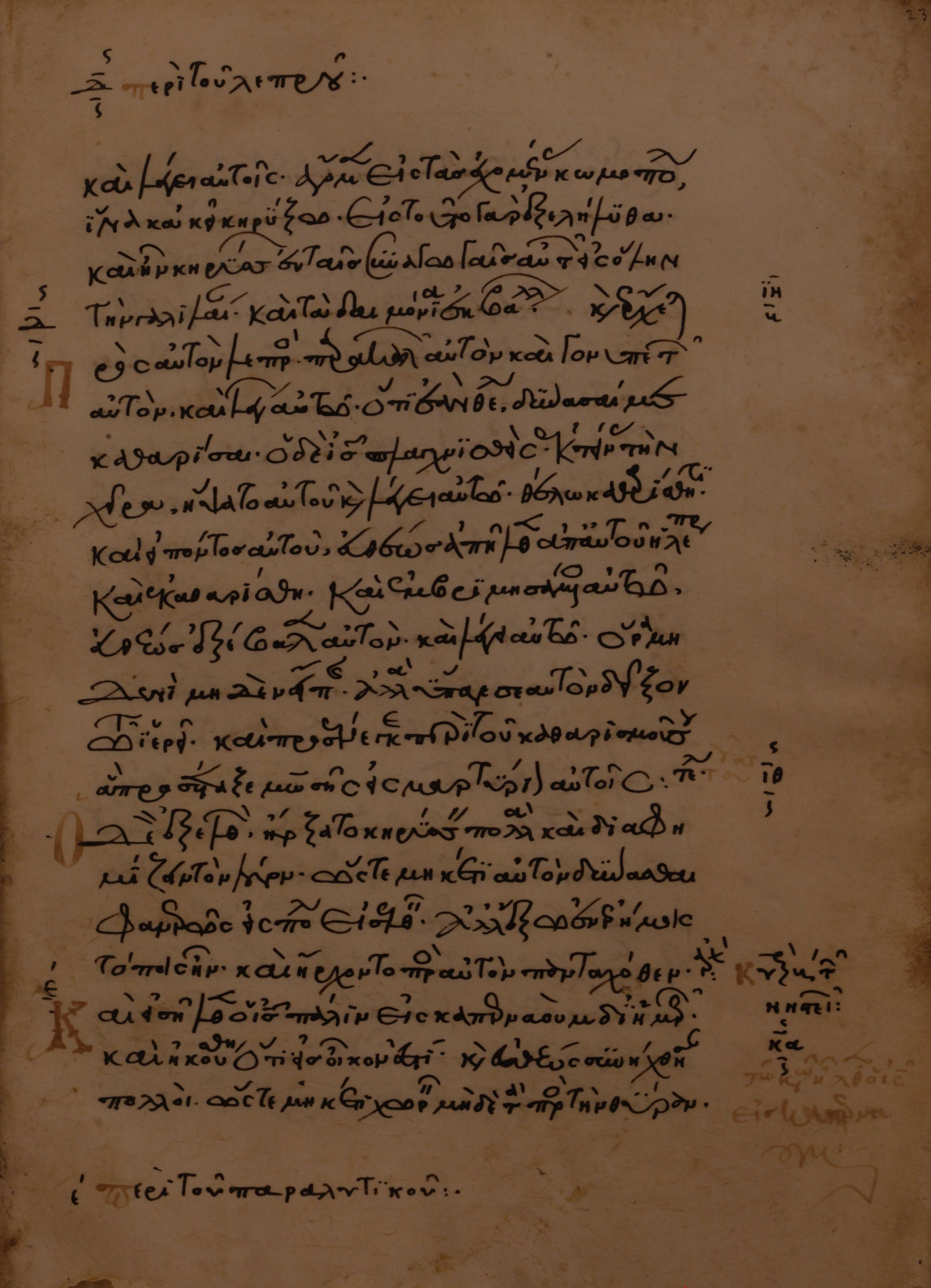
The page with text of Mark 1:38-2:2; τιτλοι (titles) on the top and the foot of page

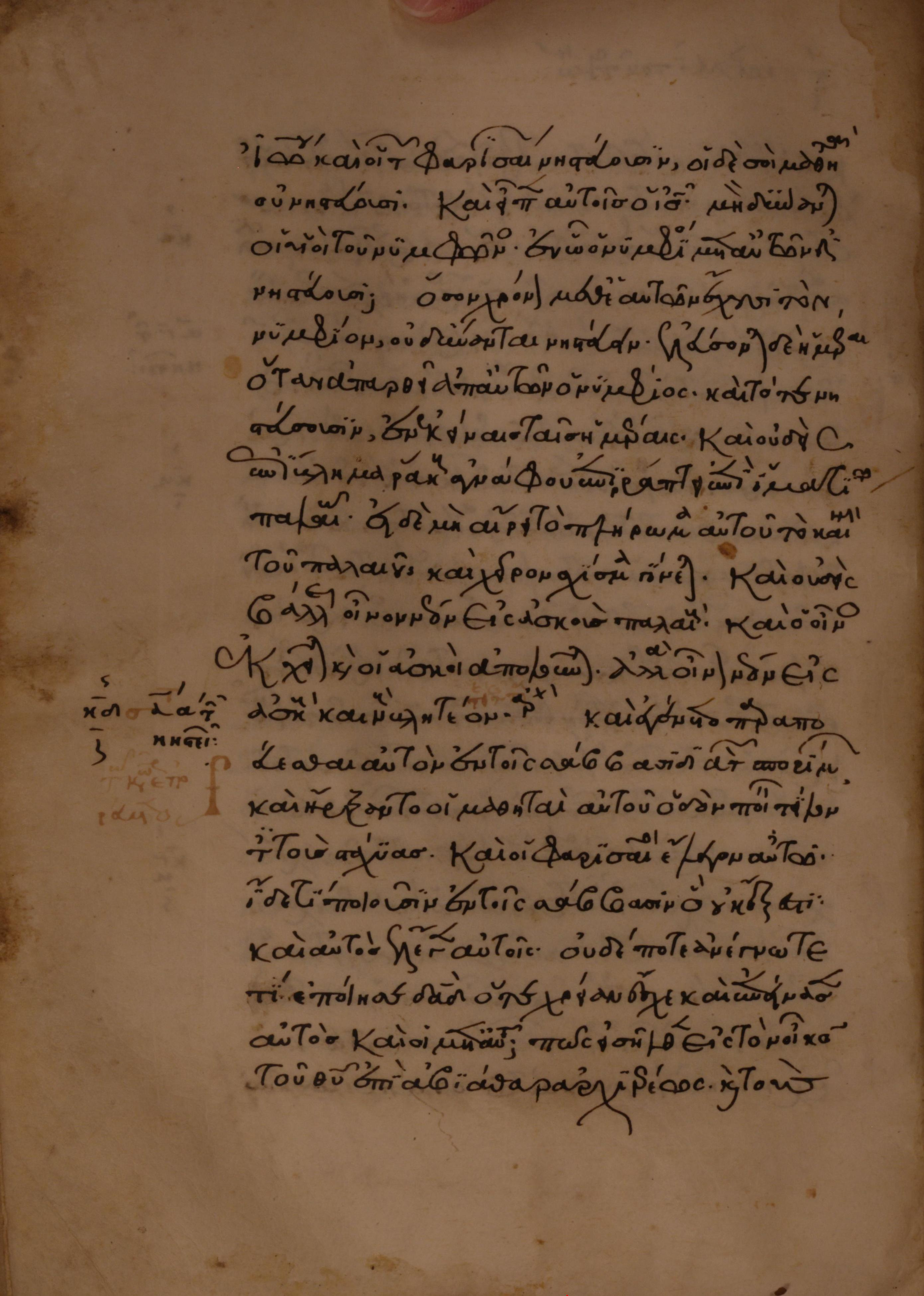
The page with text of Mark 2:18-26, in 2:22 omission by "homoiotheleuton" (omitted — ει δε μη ρηξει ο οινος τους ασκους)

== See also ==
- List of New Testament minuscules
- Biblical manuscript
- Textual criticism
