= Iotacism =

Greek shift of vowels to the [i] sound

Iotacism (Greek: ἰωτακισμός, iotakismos) or itacism is the process of vowel shift by which a number of vowels and diphthongs converged towards the pronunciation [i] in post-classical Greek and Modern Greek. The term "iotacism" refers to the letter iota, the original sign for [i], with which these vowels came to merge. The alternative term itacism refers to the new pronunciation of the name of the letter eta as [ˈita] after the change.

== Vowels and diphthongs involved ==
Ancient Greek had a broader range of vowels (see Ancient Greek phonology) than Modern Greek has. Eta (η) was a long open-mid front unrounded vowel /ɛː/, and upsilon (υ) was a close front rounded vowel /y/. Over the course of time, both vowels came to be pronounced like the close front unrounded vowel iota (ι) [i]. In addition, certain diphthongs merged to the same pronunciation. Specifically, Epsilon-iota (ει) initially became /eː/ in Classical Greek before it later raised to (ι) while, later, omicron-iota (οι) and upsilon-iota (υι) merged with upsilon (υ). As a result of eta and upsilon being affected by iotacism, so were the respective diphthongs.

In Modern Greek, the letters and digraphs ι, η, υ, ει, οι, υι (rare) are all pronounced [i].

== Issues in textual criticism ==
Iotacism caused some words with originally distinct pronunciations to be pronounced similarly, sometimes the cause of differences between manuscript readings in the New Testament. For example, the upsilon of ὑμεῖς, ὑμῶν hymeis, hymōn "ye, your" (second person plural in respectively nominative, genitive) and the eta of ἡμεῖς, ἡμῶν hēmeis, hēmōn "we, our" (first person plural in respectively nominative, genitive) could be easily confused if a lector were reading to copyists in a scriptorium. (In fact, Modern Greek had to develop a new second-person plural, εσείς, while the first-person plural's eta was opened to epsilon, εμείς, as a result of apparent attempts to prevent it sounding like the old second-person plural.) As an example of a relatively minor (almost insignificant) source of variant readings, some ancient manuscripts spelled words the way they sounded, such as the 4th-century Codex Sinaiticus, which sometimes substitutes a plain iota for the epsilon-iota digraph and sometimes does the reverse.

English-speaking textual critics use the word itacism to refer to the phenomenon and extend it loosely for all inconsistencies of spelling involving vowels.

== History ==
The first demonstration of the phenomenon was made by the Dutch humanist Erasmus of Rotterdam (1467–1536) in his treatise Dialogus de recta Latini Graecique sermonis pronuntiatione (Dialogue on the correct pronunciation of the Latin and Greek language, 1528) in which he asserted that in ancient Greek the sound of η should have been /e/, not /i/ (which is why his theory came to be called etacism). In support of this thesis a verse from the Athenian playwright Cratinus, one of the leading exponents of ancient Comedy, is quoted that speaks of a fool in this way: "ὁ δ'ἠλίθιος ὥσπερ πρόβατον βῆ λέγων βαδίζει" ('the fool walks making the sound "bee bee" like a sheep'); hardly could the verse "bee" be read /vi/, according to the iotacistic pronunciation.

Against the "Erasmian" theory came the German humanist Johannes Reuchlin (1455–1522), in whose honor the Byzantine Greek pronunciation is also called Reuchlinian.

== See also ==
- Greek language
- Greek alphabet
- Ancient Greek phonology
- Koine Greek phonology
- Medieval Greek
- Modern Greek phonology
- Vowel shift
- Minuscule 541 and Minuscule 543 – manuscripts with an unusual number of itacistic errors
