= Pronunciation of Ancient Greek in teaching =

How Ancient Greek terms are pronounced when taught

Ancient Greek has been pronounced in various ways by those studying Ancient Greek literature in various times and places. This article covers those pronunciations; the modern scholarly reconstruction of its ancient pronunciation is covered in Ancient Greek phonology.

== Greek world ==
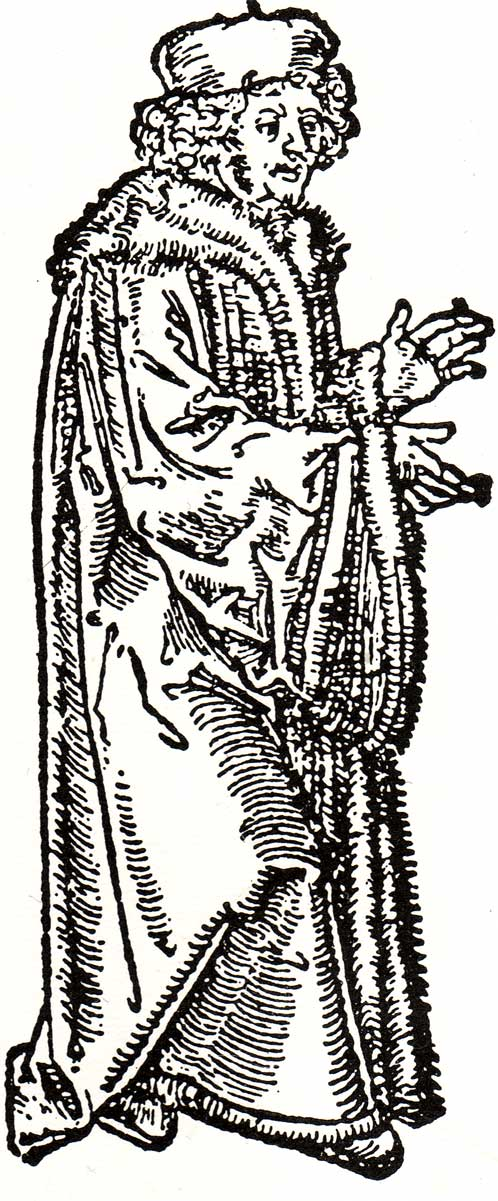
Johann Reuchlin (1516)

Among speakers of Modern Greek, from the Byzantine Empire to modern Greece, Cyprus, and the Greek diaspora, Greek texts from every period have always been pronounced by using the contemporaneous local Greek pronunciation. That makes it easy to recognize the many words that have remained the same or similar in written form from one period to another. Among Classical scholars, it is often called the Reuchlinian pronunciation, after the Renaissance scholar Johann Reuchlin, who defended its use in the West in the 16th century.

Nevertheless, Greek textbooks for secondary education give a summary description of the reconstructed pronunciation of Ancient Greek. That includes the differentiation between short and long vowels and between the various accents; the pronunciation of the spiritus asper as /h/ and the pronunciation of β, γ and δ as plosives and of diphthongs as such. However, there is often no mention of the ancient aspirate pronunciations of θ, φ and χ, which were different from the modern fricative values.

== Eastern Orthodox Church ==
The theology faculties and schools related to or belonging to the Eastern Orthodox Church use the modern Greek pronunciation to follow the tradition of the Byzantine Empire.

== Renaissance scholarship ==
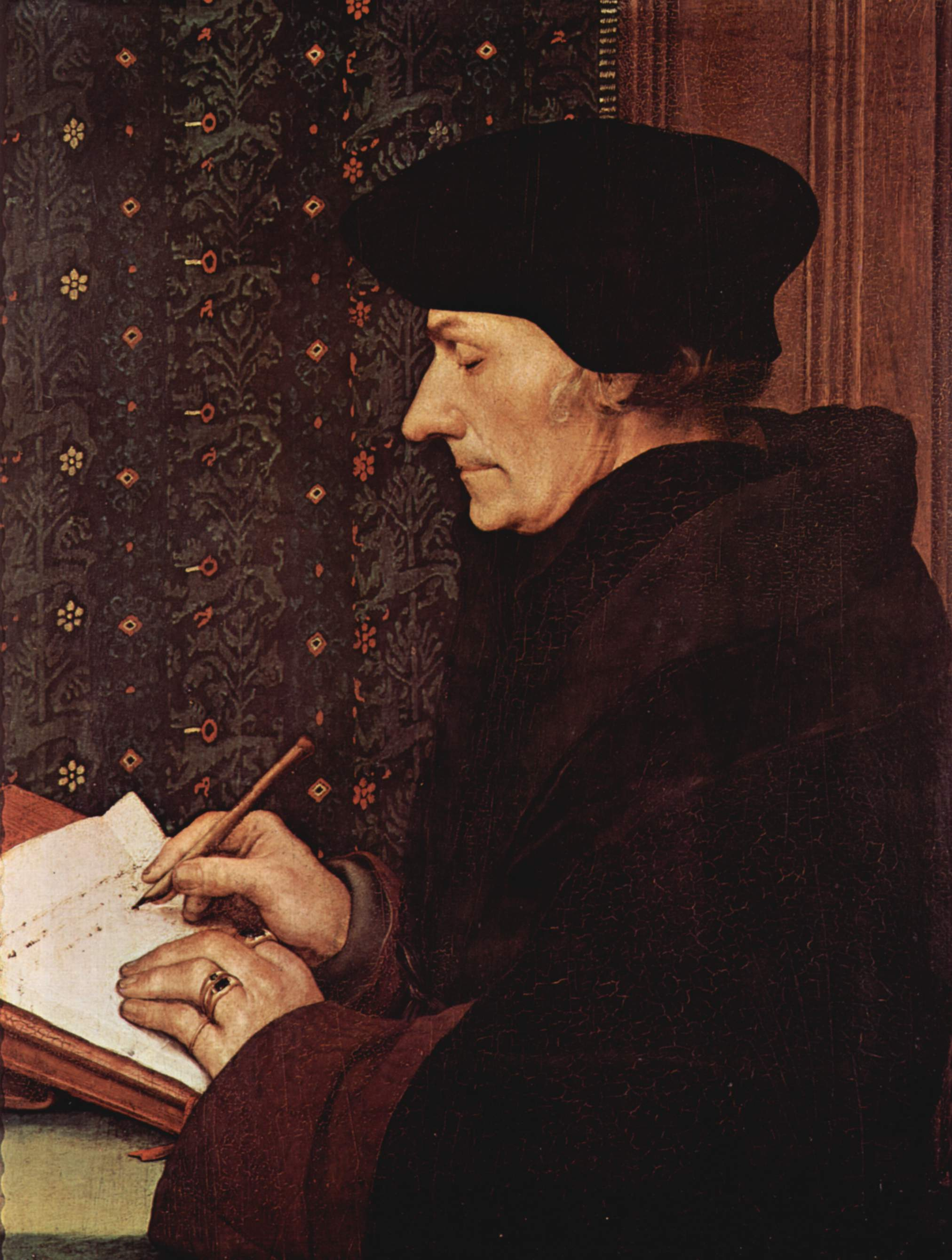
Erasmus

The study of Greek in the West expanded considerably during the Renaissance, in particular after the fall of Constantinople in 1453, when many Byzantine Greek scholars came to Western Europe. Greek texts were then universally pronounced with the medieval pronunciation that still survives intact.

From about 1486, various scholars (notably Antonio of Lebrixa, Girolamo Aleandro, and Aldus Manutius) judged that the pronunciation was inconsistent with the descriptions that were handed down by ancient grammarians, and they suggested alternative pronunciations. This work culminated in Erasmus's dialogue De recta Latini Graecique sermonis pronuntiatione (1528). The system that he proposed is called the Erasmian pronunciation.

== England and the United States ==
In 1540, John Cheke and Thomas Smith became Regius Professors at Cambridge. They independently proposed a reconstructed pronunciation of both Greek and Latin that was similar to Erasmus's scheme, and it became adopted in schools, replacing the modern Greek pronunciation in use.

Soon after the Cheke and Smith reforms, English underwent the Great Vowel Shift, which changed the phonetic values assigned to the English "long vowels", in particular. The same changes affected the English pronunciation of Greek, which thus became further removed from both Ancient Greek and from the Greek that was pronounced in other western countries.

A further peculiarity of the English pronunciation of Ancient Greek occurred as a result of the work of Isaac Vossius. He maintained in an anonymously published treatise that the written accents of Greek did not reflect the original pronunciation. Moreover, Henninius (Heinrich Christian Henning) published Dissertatio Paradoxa, which claimed that accentuation in Ancient Greek must follow the same principles as in Latin, a view that is now universally considered to be erroneous. It is generally accepted that the accented syllable in Ancient Greek is the one carrying the written accent, but most authorities consider that it was a pitch accent, rather than the Modern Greek stress accent. Henninius's has affected the pronunciation taught in schools in the UK and the Netherlands but has been resisted in the United States and other countries.

Thus, by the mid-19th century, the pronunciation of Ancient Greek in British schools was quite different from Modern Greek, from the reconstructed pronunciation of Ancient Greek and from the pronunciation used in other countries. The Classical Association, therefore, promulgated a new pronunciation as described by W. Sidney Allen in 1987, based on the reconstructed ancient pronunciation, which is now generally in use in British schools.

The reforms in the pronunciation of Ancient Greek in schools have not affected the pronunciation of individual Greek-derived words in English itself, and there is now considerable variation in the English pronunciation (and indeed spelling) of the names of Ancient Greek historical or mythological personages or places (see English words of Greek origin).

In the United States, an 1898 description by Peck gives a pronunciation system said to be prevalent at the time. It is similar to the reconstructed system advocated in England and Wales by Arnold and Conway, but with some differences in the pronunciation of the vowels. Assuming a typical American accent as an interpretation of Peck's English-language examples, the vowels α, ι, and ο/ω are pronounced as IPA /a/, /ɪ/, and /o/ (father, king, note), and for these three letters length influences only the temporal duration. Η is /e/ (fate) rather than /e̞/. Υ is /u/ instead of /y/ (while still others use /ʊ/). Another twentieth century text gives almost the same pronunciations as Peck's, except for ει (/eɪ/ rather than /ɛɪ/) and υι (/wi/ rather than /wɪ/).

== Germany ==
The situation in German education may be representative of that in many other European countries. The teaching of Greek is based on a roughly Erasmian model, but in practice, it is heavily skewed towards the phonological system of German or the other host language.

Thus, German-speakers do not use a fricative [θ] for θ but give it the same pronunciation as τ, [t], but φ and χ are realised as the fricatives [f] and [x] ~ [ç]. ζ is usually pronounced as an affricate, but a voiceless one, like German z [ts]. However, σ is often voiced, according like s in German before a vowel, [z].

ευ and ηυ are not distinguished from οι but are both pronounced [ɔʏ], following the German eu, äu. Similarly, ει and αι are often not distinguished, both pronounced [aɪ], like the similar German ei, ai, and ει is sometimes pronounced [ɛɪ].

No attempt is usually made to reproduce the accentuation contrast between acute and circumflex accents.

While the deviations are often acknowledged as compromises in teaching, awareness of other German-based idiosyncrasies is less widespread. German-speakers typically try to reproduce vowel-length distinctions in stressed syllables, but they often fail to do so in non-stressed syllables, and they are also prone to use a reduction of e-sounds to [ə].

The distinctive length of double vs. single consonants is usually not observed, and German patterns of vowel length interrelating with the closedness and the openness of syllables may affect the realisation of Greek vowels before consonant clusters, even in stressed syllables: ε, η = [ɛ] ~ [eː]; ο, ω = [ɔ] ~ [oː]; ι, ῑ = [ɪ] ~ [iː]; υ, ῡ = [ʏ] ~ [yː]; ου = [ʊ] ~ [uː].

In reading poetry, it is customary to render the scansion patterns by strong dynamic accents on the long syllables, despite the natural accentuation of the words, not by the actual length.

== France ==
Pronunciation of Ancient Greek in French secondary schools is based on Erasmian pronunciation, but it is modified to match the phonetics and even, in the case of αυ and ευ, the orthography of French.

Vowel length distinction, geminate consonants and pitch accent are discarded completely, which matches the current phonology of Standard French. The reference Greek-French dictionary, Dictionnaire Grec-Français by A. Bailly et al., does not even bother to indicate vowel length in long syllables.

Except for vowel length, the values for simple vowels are generally correct, but many speakers have problems with the openness distinction between ε and η, ο and ω, matching similar confusion by many speakers of Modern French. α or ο, followed by a nasal consonant and another consonant, is often nasalized as [ɑ̃] or [ɔ̃] ([ɑ̃ntrɔpos] for ἄνθρωπος), under the influence of French.

The pseudo-diphthong ει is erroneously pronounced [ɛj] or [ej], regardless of whether the ει derives from a genuine diphthong or a ε̄. The pseudo-diphthong ου has a value of [u], which is historically attested in Ancient Greek.

Short-element ι diphthongs αι, οι and υι are pronounced rather accurately as [aj], [ɔj], [yj], but at least some websites recommend the less accurate pronunciation [ɥi] for υι. Short-element υ diphthongs αυ and ευ are pronounced like similar-looking French pseudo-diphthongs au and eu: [o]~[ɔ] and [ø]~[œ], respectively.

The ι is not pronounced in long-element ι diphthongs, which reflects the pronunciation of Biblical and later Greek (see iota subscript). As for long-element υ diphthongs, common Greek methods or grammars in France appear to ignore them in their descriptions of the pronunciation of Ancient Greek.

The values for consonants are generally correct. However, the lack of similar sounds in Modern French means that the spiritus asper is not pronounced in France; it is pronounced in French-speaking Belgium and possibly Switzerland because of the proximity of Dutch- and German-speaking regions, respectively. Also, θ and χ are pronounced [t] and [k], and φ is pronounced [f]. Under the influence of French, ρ and ῥ are both pronounced [ʀ], but French editors generally edit geminate -ῤῥ- as -ρρ-. Also, γ, before a velar consonant, is generally pronounced [n]. The digraph γμ is pronounced [ɡm], and ζ is pronounced [dz], but both pronunciations are questionable in the light of modern scholarly research.

More generally, no attempt is made to reproduce the unwritten allophones thought to have existed by modern scholarly research.

One particularly famed piece of schoolyard Greek in France is the line, supposedly by Xenophon, "they did not take the city, for hope said bad things" (οὐκ ἔλαβον πόλιν· άλλα γὰρ ἐλπὶς ἔφη κακά, ouk élabon pólin; álla gàr elpìs éphē kaká). Read in the French manner, it macaronically becomes "Où qu'est la bonne Pauline? A la gare. Elle pisse et fait caca." ("Where is Pauline the maid? At the station. She's pissing and taking a shit.") In English literature, the untranslated line makes an appearance in James Joyce's Finnegans Wake.

== Italy ==
Ancient Greek in Italy is always taught in the Erasmian pronunciation. However, Italian speakers find it hard to reproduce the pitch-based Ancient Greek accent accurately so the circumflex and acute accents are not distinguished. Poetry is read using metric conventions that stress the long syllables. Consonant length is relevant in Italian and thus respected in Greek. Vowel length is not relevant in Italian and no effort is made to distinguish long and short vowels in Greek.

- β is a voiced bilabial plosive [b], as in Italian bambino or English baby
- γ is a voiced velar plosive [ɡ], as in Italian gatto or English got. When γ is before κ γ χ ξ, it is nasalized as [ŋ]
- κ is a voiceless velar plosive [k]
- ζ is a voiced alveolar affricate [dz], as in Italian zero
- τ is a voiceless dental plosive [t]
- θ is taught as a voiceless dental fricative, as in English thing [θ], but since Italian does not have that sound, it is often pronounced arbitrarily as a voiceless alveolar affricate [ts], as in Italian zio, or rather as τ, a voiceless dental plosive [t]
- φ is a voiceless labiodental fricative [f], as in Italian futuro or English fall, not an aspirate
- χ is taught as a voiceless velar fricative [x], as in German ach, but since Italian does not have that sound, it is often pronounced as κ (voiceless velar plosive [k])
- υ is a close front rounded vowel, as French u, [y]
- ου is pronounced as a close back rounded vowel [u] as in Italian uno.
- rough breathing is frequently ignored, as Italian has no [h] sound.
- iota subscript is taught to be mute, so ᾳ, ῃ, ῳ are simply pronounced [a], [e], [o];
- graphic <ει> diphthongs are always pronounced according to their face value /ei/ (which leads to the confusion of "true" and "fake" diphthongs), but not for the diphthong ου, pronounced [u];

The following diphthongs are pronounced like the similarly written Italian diphthongs:

- αυ = [au]
- οι = [ɔi] ([oi] if not stressed)
- ει = [ɛi] ([ei] if not stressed)
- αι = [ai].

== Spain ==
As in most European countries, Ancient Greek is most usually, if not always, taught in the Erasmian pronunciation. Lately, however, some scholar reference books devote some space to the explanation of reconstructed Ancient Greek phonology.

Due to Castilian Spanish phonological features, the Erasmian pronunciation is fairly well reflected, but, as expected, phonological features of Spanish sneak in the Erasmian pronunciation. The following are the most distinctive (and frequent) features of Spanish pronunciation of Ancient Greek:

- following Spanish phonotactics, voiced plosives β, γ, δ are pronounced in most contexts as voiced fricatives ([β], [ɣ], [ð]), only in certain contexts as plosives ([b], [g], [d]);
- the aspirates θ, φ, χ are pronounced as voiceless fricatives ([θ], [f], [x]);
- following Spanish phonotactics, the double consonants ζ, ξ, ψ are difficult to differentiate in pronunciation by many students of Ancient Greek, although ξ is usually effectively rendered as [ks];
- initial ῥ- is pronounced as double -ρρ- ([r]);
- consonant length is ignored altogether (e. g. -λλ- and -ππ- are simply pronounced as -λ- and -π-);
- both vocalic quantity and vowel openness are ignored altogether: thus, no effort is made to distinguish vocalic pairs such as ε : η and ο : ω;
- the vowel υ, although taught as [y] (absent in the Spanish phonological system), is mostly pronounced as [i];
- graphic diphthongs are always pronounced according to their face value (which leads to the confusion of "true" and "fake" diphthongs), except the diphthong ου, usually pronounced [u] (or sometimes, according to face value, [ou]);
- iota subscript is ignored altogether: ᾳ, ῃ, ῳ are simply pronounced [a], [e], [o];
- due to Spanish phonology, the spiritus asper is mostly pronounced as [x], although, following the pronunciation of English, some effort is made to pronounce it as [h];
- no difference is made in pronunciation between the acute (grave) and circumflex accents.

== See also ==
- Church Slavonic#Recensions, for the similar practice of pronouncing Church Slavonic in Eastern Orthodox communities.
- Latin regional pronunciations, for the similar practice of pronouncing Latin in several European countries.
- Sino-Xenic pronunciations, for the similar practice of pronouncing Classical Chinese in East Asian countries.
