= Outline of the humanities =

Overview of and topical guide to the humanities

The following outline is provided as an overview of and topical guide to the humanities:

Humanities – academic disciplines that study the human condition, using methods that are primarily analytical, critical, or speculative, as distinguished from the mainly empirical approaches of the natural sciences.

== What types of things are the humanities? ==
The humanities can be described as all of the following:

- a branch of academic disciplines – an academic discipline is a field of knowledge that is taught and researched at the college or university level. Disciplines are defined (in part), and recognized by the academic journals in which research is published, and the learned societies and academic departments or faculties to which their practitioners belong.
- study of the human condition – unique and inescapable features of being human in a social, cultural, and personal context. The study of the humanities (history, philosophy, literature, the arts, etc.) all help understand the nature of the human condition and the broader cultural and social arrangements that make up human lives.

== The various humanities ==
- Classics (outline) – study of the languages, literature, philosophy, history, art, archaeology and all other cultural elements of the ancient Mediterranean world (Bronze Age ca. BC 3000 to Late Antiquity ca. AD 300–600); especially Ancient Greece and Ancient Rome.
  - Digital classics – application of the tools of digital humanities to the field of classics, or more broadly to the study of the ancient world.
- History (outline) – study of the past.
  - Digital history – use of digital media and tools for historical practice, presentation, analysis, and research. It is a branch of the Digital Humanities and an outgrowth of Quantitative history, Cliometrics, and History and Computing.
- Languages – study of individual languages (Italian language, Japanese language) or groups of related languages (Romance languages, Slavic languages). Not to be confused with Linguistics, the study of the structure and function of language.
- Literature (outline) – the art of written work, and is not confined to published sources (although, under some circumstances, unpublished sources can also be exempt).
  - Comparative literature comparative research into literature from more than one language, working with the original languages in which the texts were written
- Philosophy (outline) – study of general and fundamental problems, such as those connected with existence, knowledge, values, reason, mind, and language. Philosophy is distinguished from other ways of addressing such problems by its critical, generally systematic approach and its reliance on rational argument.
- Religion (outline) – a religion is a collection of cultural systems, belief systems, and worldviews that establishes symbols that relate humanity to spirituality and, sometimes, to moral values. Many religions have narratives, symbols, traditions and sacred histories that are intended to give meaning to life or to explain the origin of life or the universe. They tend to derive morality, ethics, religious laws or a preferred lifestyle from their ideas about the cosmos and human nature.
- Visual arts (outline) – art forms that create works which are primarily visual in nature. Examples of visual arts include:
  - Architecture (outline) – The art and science of designing and erecting buildings and other physical structures.
    - Classical architecture (outline) – architecture of classical antiquity and later architectural styles influenced by it.
  - Arts and crafts (outline) – recreational activities and hobbies that involve making things with one's hands and skill.
  - Drawing (outline) – visual art that makes use of any number of drawing instruments to mark a two-dimensional medium.
  - Film (outline) – moving pictures.
  - Painting (outline) – practice of applying paint, pigment, color or other medium to a surface with a brush or other object.
  - Art history
  - Photography (outline) – art, science, and practice of creating pictures by recording radiation on a radiation-sensitive medium, such as a photographic film, or electronic image sensors.
  - Sculpture (outline) – three-dimensional artwork created by shaping or combining hard materials - typically stone such as marble - or metal, glass, or wood.
- Performing arts (outline) – those forms of art that use the artist's own body, face, and presence as a medium. Examples of performing arts include:
  - Dance (outline) – art form of movement of the body, usually rhythmic and to music, used as a form of expression, social interaction, or presented in a spiritual or performance setting.
  - Drama study of regional, global, or historical theatre, as well as techniques for acting, directing and choreographing plays
  - Film (outline) – moving pictures, the art form that records performances visually.
  - Installation art – the merging of multiple genres into a coherent three-dimensional, multi-sensory work.
  - Theatre (outline) – collaborative form of fine art that uses live performers to present the experience of a real or imagined event before a live audience in a specific place.
  - Music (outline) – art form the medium of which is sound and silence.
  - Opera (outline) – art form in which singers and musicians perform a dramatic work combining text (called a libretto) and musical score.
  - Stagecraft (outline) – technical aspects of theatrical, film, and video production. It includes, but is not limited to, constructing and rigging scenery, hanging and focusing of lighting, design and procurement of costumes, makeup, procurement of props, stage management, and recording and mixing of sound.

=== Social sciences that incorporate humanistic methods ===
- Anthropology (outline) – study of how humans developed biologically and culturally.
- Archaeology (outline) – research into human history by locating and studying artifacts, structural remains, and other surviving evidence
- Area studies – interdisciplinary fields of research and scholarship pertaining to particular geographical, national/federal, or cultural regions. The term exists primarily as a general description for what are, in the practice of scholarship, many heterogeneous fields of research, encompassing both the social sciences and the humanities. Typical area studies programs involve history, political science, sociology, cultural studies, languages, geography, literature, and related disciplines. In contrast to cultural studies, area studies often include diaspora and emigration from the area studied.
- Communication studies (outline) – deals with processes of human communication, commonly defined as the sharing of symbols to create meaning. The discipline encompasses a range of topics, from face-to-face conversation to mass media outlets such as television broadcasting. Communication studies also examines how messages are interpreted through the political, cultural, economic, and social dimensions of their contexts.
- Cultural studies (outline) – interdisciplinary academic field grounded in critical theory and literary criticism that attempts to understand the political dynamics of contemporary culture, as well as its historical foundations, conflicts, and defining traits. Researchers concentrate on how a particular medium or message relates to ideology, social class, nationality, ethnicity, sexuality and gender rather than investigating a particular culture or area of the world.
- History (outline) – study of the past.
- Law (outline) – set of rules and principles by which a society is governed. (For branches, see Law under Society below).

=== Interdisciplinary humanities ===
- Area studies interdisciplinary approach to studying a geographic area.
- Ecological humanities – interdisciplinary area of research, drawing on the many environmental sub-disciplines that have emerged in the humanities over the past several decades (in particular environmental philosophy, environmental history and environmental anthropology).
- Ethno-cultural studies, such as: African-American studies, Latino studies, and other programs that take an interdisciplinary approach to ethno-cultural research
- Gender studies interdisciplinary investigation of gender roles in culture, economics, business, politics, medicine, fine arts, media, etc.
- Library studies
- Museology
- Women's studies interdisciplinary study of the roles of women and ways of defining and redefining the feminine identity

=== Applied humanities ===
- Applied arts such as fashion design, graphic design, industrial design, interior design
- Health humanities – application of humanities disciplines to discourse about, expression of, or the promotion of the dimensions of human health and well being.
- Medical humanities – is an interdisciplinary field of medicine which includes the humanities and their application to medical education and practice.

== General humanities methodologies ==
- Digital humanities – area of research, teaching, and creation concerned with the intersection of computing and the disciplines of the humanities. It is focused on the digitization and analysis of materials related to the traditional disciplines of the humanities.
  - Digital classics – application of the tools of digital humanities to the field of classics, or more broadly to the study of the ancient world.
  - Digital history – use of digital media and tools for historical practice, presentation, analysis, and research. It is a branch of the Digital Humanities and an outgrowth of Quantitative history, Cliometrics, and History and Computing.

== Humanities by region ==
- Humanities in the United States

== Politics and the humanities ==
- Arts and Humanities Research Council – British Research Council and non-departmental public body that provides approximately £102 million from the Government to support research and postgraduate study in the arts and humanities.
- Berlin Declaration on Open Access to Knowledge in the Sciences and Humanities – major international statement on open access / access to knowledge. By 24 October 2011, 324 organizations had signed the declaration.
- Humanities Colleges – part of the Specialist Schools Programme in the United Kingdom, and a source of extra funding.
- National Endowment for the Humanities – independent federal agency of the United States established by the National Foundation on the Arts and the Humanities Act of 1965 dedicated to supporting research, education, preservation, and public programs in the humanities.
- President's Committee on the Arts and Humanities – established in Washington, DC in 1982 by an Executive Order from President Ronald Reagan and works with each Administration to incorporate the arts and the humanities into White House objectives.
- Public humanities – work of federal, state, nonprofit and community-based cultural organizations that engage the public in conversations, facilitate and present lectures, exhibitions, performances and other programs for the general public on topics such as history, philosophy, popular culture and the arts.

== History of the humanities ==
- Humanitas
- List of people considered a founder in a Humanities field
- Renaissance humanism – movement of cultural and educational reform that focused on study of the studia humanitatis, today known as the humanities.
- History of Humanities – there is only one journal devoted to the history of all humanities disciplines across periods and cultures, published by the University of Chicago Press.

=== History of humanities fields ===
- History of the classics
  - Origins of the classics
    - Ancient Greece (outline) –
    - Ancient Rome (outline) –
- Historiography – history of history.
- Origin of language
- History of literature
- History of philosophy
- History of religion
- History of the visual arts
  - History of architecture
  - History of arts and crafts
  - History of drawing
  - History of film
  - History of painting
  - History of photography
  - History of sculpture
- History of performing arts
  - History of dance
  - History of film
  - History of theatre
  - History of music
  - History of opera
  - History of stagecraft

==== History of the humanities that are also social sciences ====
- History of anthropology
- History of area studies
- History of communication studies
- Historiography – history of history.
- History of law

== Humanities education ==
- Master of Humanities
- Public humanities

=== Some humanities departments ===
- Humanities Division, University of Oxford
- MIT School of Humanities, Arts, and Social Sciences
- Moscow University for the Humanities
- Stanford University School of Humanities and Sciences
- University of California Humanities Research Institute – university system-wide research institute headquartered at the UC Irvine campus that promotes collaboration and interdisciplinarity through supporting work by teams of researchers from varying fields both within and outside of the UC system.

== Humanities awards ==
- National Humanities Medal – given by the National Endowment for the Humanities to honor individuals or groups whose work has deepened the nation's understanding of the humanities, broadened citizens’ engagement with the humanities, or helped preserve and expand Americans’ access to important resources in the humanities.

== Publications in the humanities ==
List of humanities journals

- Arts and Humanities Citation Index
- British Humanities Index

== General humanities organizations ==
- National Humanities Center
- Society for Digital Humanities

== People influential in the humanities ==
- List of people considered a founder in a Humanities field

== See also ==
- Humanities reference desk
- Great Books
- Great Books programs in Canada
- Liberal Arts
- Social sciences
- Human science
- The Two Cultures
- List of academic disciplines
- "Periodic Table of Human Sciences" in Tinbergen's four questions
