= Deborah Kamen =

American university teacher

Academic background
- Education: Bryn Mawr College (BA), Oxford University (MSt), Berkeley (PhD)
- Thesis: Conceptualizing manumission in ancient Greece (2005)

Academic work
- Discipline: Classics
- Sub-discipline: Greek History
- Website: https://classics.washington.edu/people/deborah-kamen

Deborah Kamen is Professor of Classics at the University of Washington. Her research is on Greek cultural and social history, with a particular focus on ancient slavery.

== Career ==
Deborah Kamen read for her BA in Classical Languages at Bryn Mawr College in 1998, where she began studying Greek after learning Latin in high school. This was followed by an MSt in Greek History at New College, Oxford University in 1999, and an MA in Greek at the University of California Berkeley in 2000. In 2005 she completed a PhD in Classics at Berkeley, with a thesis titled "Conceptualizing manumission in ancient Greece." From 2005-7 she was a Mellon Post-Doctoral Fellow at Stanford University, before moving to the University of Washington in 2007 as an Assistant Professor in Classics. She was promoted to Professor in 2020. Between 2010 and 2019 she was one of the co-chairs of the Lambda Classical Caucus, "A Coalition of Queer Classicists and Allies."

Kamen has been the recipient of multiple awards for her research on Greek History. In 1998-9 she was awarded The Lionel Pearson Fellowship by the Society for Classical Studies. In 2014 she was the Simon Visiting Professor in Ancient History at the University of Manchester. In 2017 she and Sarah Levin-Richardson won the Barbara McManus Award for Best Article from the Women's Classical Caucus, for their article "Lusty Ladies in the Roman Imaginary."

== Research ==
Kamen works primarily on the social and cultural history of Ancient Greece, with particular attention to slavery. Her first book Status in Classical Athens (2013) was described as "indispensable reading for anyone interested in ancient Athenian society" and an "important contribution to scholarship." She has also written a book on Insults in Classical Athens (2020) and co-edited the volume Slavery and Sexuality in Classical Antiquity (2021).
