= Hellenic Quest =

Urban legend

Hellenic Quest is a 2008 urban legend claiming that engineers were developing supercomputers that would use Ancient Greek as their programming interface, due to its logical superiority over all other languages.

== History ==
The hoax circulated around Greek website and was widely reproduced without verification by many reputable sources from newspapers to the then Minister for National Education and Religious Affairs. The hoax was presented as a fake CNN article reporting that Apple was developing a software product for teaching the Ancient Greek language to foreigners and scientists, in the light of the upcoming development of supercomputers that will use Ancient Greek as their programming interface, due to this language's superior logical structure. The urban legend often attributes this quote to Bill Gates. A prototype computer that was allegedly under development as part of this project was called "Ibycus".

The text contains a number of factual errors, unproved assertions and exaggerations. The origin of this hoax is not clear. The author probably uses CNN and Apple Computer as a means to give more credibility to the story. The story is sometimes enhanced with linguistic-sounding arguments. It also has several obscure references to the Thesaurus Linguae Graecae project, a project undertaken by the University of California, Irvine for the purpose of digitizing all ancient and medieval Greek texts. The computer prototype "Ibycus", is the operating system implemented by David W. Packard in the early 1980s to search and browse TLG texts represented in beta code. There is no connection between Ibycus and the so-called "Hellenic Quest."

The Ancient Greek language (or any other language) has nothing to do with the binary logic that forms the basis of computers' function. Even advanced concepts in computation, such as fuzzy logic, knowledge-based systems and quantum computation have absolutely no use whatsoever for the extreme expressiveness of any of the world's languages anyway, "rich and powerful" as they may be characterized; the notions understood by computers are very basic.

== Urban legend spread ==
The hoax was reproduced by many reputable sources like the newspaper Imerisia, the Embassy of Greece in Washington, and the Hellenic Physical Society. On January 27, 2008, the Minister for National Education and Religious Affairs of Greece, Evripidis Stylianidis, reproduced the hoax in his opening speech for the finals of the annual student debate competition, in an attempt to praise the Greek language superiority. The event took place at the old Greek parliament and it was subject to criticism by the press.

== Similar claims ==
A similar hoax, named sometimes called Mission Sanskrit, names Sanskrit as being ideal for programming. A version of the hoax reads:

There is a report by a NASA scientist that America is creating 6th and 7th generation supercomputers based on the Sanskrit language. Project deadline is 2025 for 6th generation and 2034 for 7th generation computer. After this, there will be a revolution all over the world to learn Sanskrit.

The idea has been picked up by multiple politicians. One Indian politician claimed that "according to a research by US space research organisation NASA, if computer programming is done in Sanskrit, it will be flawless."
