= Kleanthis Vikas =

Greek educator

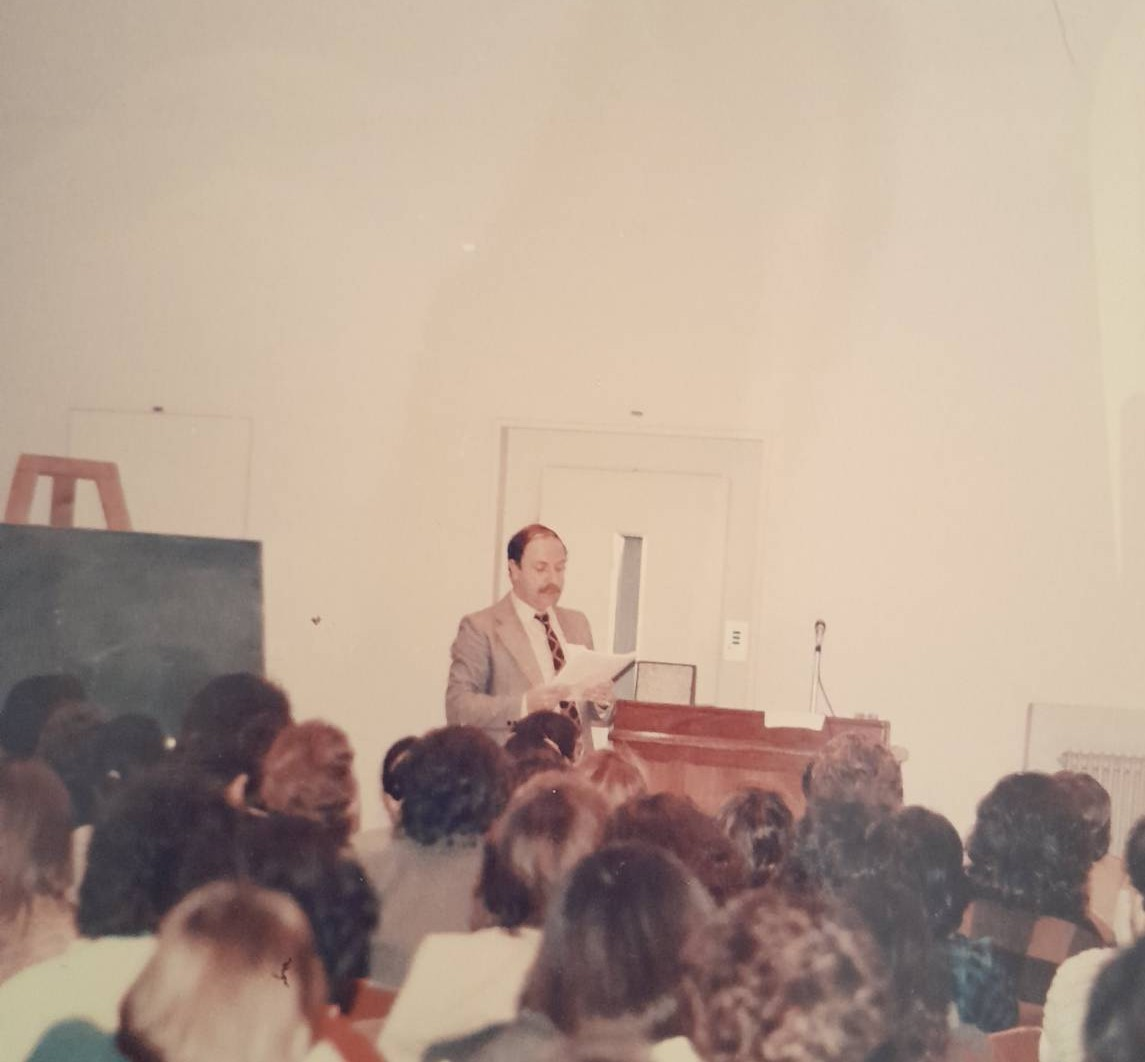
- Born: 1942
- Died: 1990 (aged 47–48)
- Citizenship: Greek
- Education: Aristotle University of Thessaloniki, University of Hull
- Known for: Introducing the English Language in the Greek educational system through the use of personal computers
- Children: 2

Kleanthis Vikas (common spelling before ELOT system Cleanthis C. Vickas) was an English teacher, writer, and reformer of the educational system in Greece.

== Early life and education ==
Vikas studied English Language and Literature at Aristotle University of Thessaloniki and earned his M.Ed. from the University of Hull.

== Career ==
The Greek Ministry of Education appointed him educational counselor, with the goal to insert English language courses in the early education years in Greek schools. He commenced the pilot programme for the use of personal computers in public schools for English teaching. He was part of the writing team of Task Way, the first complete course book to be used in public schools of Greece.

== Legacy ==
On June 9, 1990, the School of Philosophy of the University of Athens hosted a conference in his memory, discussing educational challenges. The conference proceedings included mentions of his work and presentations from students and colleagues. He published several books and methods of the use of English, including Useful English Grammar with co-writer Apostolos Ouzounis.
