= Azusa Pacific University =

Christian university in Azusa, California, US

- Former names: Training School for Christian Workers (1899–1939); Pacific Bible College (1939–1956); Azusa College (1956–1965); Azusa-Pacific College (1965–1981)
- Motto: "God First"
- Type: Private research university
- Established: 1899; 127 years ago
- Accreditation: WSCUC
- Religious affiliation: evangelical Christian (Inter-denominational)
- Academic affiliations: CCCU; NAICU; CIC; Space-grant
- President: Adam J. Morris
- Provost: Anita Henck
- Faculty: 947
- Administrative staff: 628
- Students: 7,120
- Undergraduates: 3,795
- Postgraduates: 3,703
- Location: Azusa, California, United States; 34.12971°N 117.88888°W
- Campus: Suburban, 105 acres (42 ha) on two campuses
- Colors: Brick (Pantone 1807) and Black
- Nickname: Cougars
- Sporting affiliations: NCAA Division III – SCIAC
- Mascot: Freddy the Cougar
- Website: apu.edu

Azusa Pacific University (APU) is a private evangelical research university in Azusa, California, United States. The university was founded in 1899 in Whittier, California, with classes first held on March 3, 1900, and degrees offered in 1939. The university's seminary, the Graduate School of Theology, holds to a Wesleyan-Arminian doctrinal theology. APU offers more than 100 associate, bachelor's, master's, and doctoral programs on campus, online, and at seven regional locations across Southern California.

Azusa Pacific University is organized into several colleges and schools: The College of Arts, Humanities, Sciences, and Theology (School of the Arts, School of Humanities and Sciences, School of Theology); the College of Education and Behavioral Sciences (School of Education, School of Behavioral Sciences); the College of Nursing and Health Sciences (School of Nursing, School of Health Sciences); the School of Business and Management (including the Leung School of Accounting); and Azusa Pacific Seminary. APU is accredited by the WASC Senior College and University Commission (WSCUC), and also has 14 professional accreditations.

== History ==
History
Training School for Christian Workers	Established	1899
Pacific Bible College	Renamed	1939
Azusa College	Renamed	1956
Azusa Pacific College and Arlington College	Merged	1968
Azusa Pacific University	Renamed	1981

Azusa Pacific University was established on March 3, 1899, in Whittier, California. Under the name Training School for Christian Workers, it was the first Bible college on the West Coast. Led by president Mary A. Hill, the school initially had a total enrollment of 12 students.

Early years saw the school relocate and change leadership several times. In 1939, Cornelius P. Haggard became the school's 13th president. In response to low enrollment and a lack of donations, Haggard launched a variety of fundraising efforts. Haggard served for the next 36 years.

Following mergers with three Southern California colleges, the university relocated in 1946 to the city of Azusa, where it resides today. In 1939 the Training School became Pacific Bible College, and four-year degrees were offered. In 1956, the name was changed to Azusa College. By 1965, Azusa College had become Azusa-Pacific College (APC), and three years later, APC merged with Arlington College. Upon its achievement of university status in 1981, the college changed its name to Azusa Pacific University.

After Haggard's death, Paul E. Sago became president, serving until 1989. Sago encouraged the development and growth of off-site educational regional campuses throughout Southern California, and presided over the addition of master's degree programs and the development of schools within the university.

Richard E. Felix, became president in 1990, and initiated the university's first doctoral programs. He also introduced the university's "Four Cornerstones," Christ, Scholarship, Community, and Service, and oversaw the construction of seven new buildings, a doubling of student enrollment, and a quadrupling of graduate programs.

When nearby institution, Ambassador College closed in 1997, the Worldwide Church of God and Azusa Pacific University jointly established the Ambassador Center at Azusa Pacific University for the continuation of classes for former Ambassador College students.

In November 2000, then-Executive Vice President Jon R. Wallace, DBA, became president. In April 2018, Wallace announced his plan to retire and accepted his new role as president emeritus.

In 2017, a new independent economic study found that APU generates $1.25 billion in economic impact within California each year. Of that, APU contributes $37 million in state taxes each year and supports 7,260 jobs statewide. The report also found approximately 47,500 APU alumni reside within California, increasing the state's productivity and earning power. Of those, 10,600 APU alumni and 600 APU employees live in the San Gabriel Valley.

Paul W. Ferguson was named APU’s 17^{th} president in April 2019, then retired during the fall 2021 semester. Adam J. Morris became the 18^{th} president of APU in July 2022. Morris has overseen the implementation of a new strategic plan called the Nehemiah Initiative;^{[11]} a renewed focus on APU’s Christ-centered mission; a new General Education program; the establishment of the Institute for Faith, Learning, and Service; the construction of the Military and Veterans Center; and the return of APU’s football program.

As of February 2022, Moody’s Investors Service affirmed APU’s Ba2 issuer rating with a stable outlook, reflecting the university’s improved liquidity, growing cash and investments, and management’s efforts to align expenses with revenue, despite previous financial challenges and a competitive environment in Southern California.

=== Religious Affiliations ===
A small group of Quakers (also known as Friends) and a Methodist evangelist laid the foundation for the Training School for Christian Workers in 1899.

As faculty members began to embrace Evangelicalism and reject a growing liberal trend in the California Yearly Meeting of Friends, a campus church was established in 1933. This shift moved the "school church" from the local Huntington Park Friends Church to the on-campus worship gathering. The new campus church planted eight "tabernacles" throughout California which collectively became known as the Evangel Church denomination.

The series of college mergers and campus re-locations which followed helped to solidify the school's identity as an Evangelical institution.

=== Presidents ===
The university has had a total of 18 presidents since its founding.

== Academics ==
Academic rankings

National
- Forbes: 262
- U.S. News & World Report: 266 (Best National Universities)
- WSJ/College Pulse: 62

Azusa Pacific University academic resources include the Writing Center, Accessibility Services, Testing Services, Tutoring Services, university libraries, Math Center, Academic Success Center, and the Graduate and Professional Registrar. Special programs include the Friends Center, Honors College, Sigma Theta Tau (Iota Sigma), and the Western Conservancy of Nursing History.

=== Rankings ===
In addition to the rankings at the top of this section, the Wall Street Journal also named APU the No. 1 Christian university in California, the top nationally ranked institution in the Council for Christian Colleges & Universities, and No. 1 for Best Salaries for Graduates among Christian universities.

=== University Libraries and Special Collections ===
The APU libraries include the William V. Marshburn Library (East Campus), the Hugh and Hazel Darling Library (West Campus), the Stamps Theological Library (West Campus), and off-campus libraries supporting academic programs at the APU High Desert, Inland Empire, Los Angeles, Orange County, San Diego, and Murrieta locations.

A unified catalog identifies the more than 240,000 books, media items, and 1,900 periodical titles in the libraries' print collections. More than 703,000 microforms include the Library of American Civilization, Library of American Literature, The New York Times, and Educational Resources Information Center collections. The university network also provides access to more than 140 online databases, which include more than 46,000 electronic journals.

In the fall of 2009, Azusa Pacific University acquired a collection of antiquities, including five fragments of the Dead Sea Scrolls and five first-edition prints of the King James Bible. These new acquisitions were displayed in an exhibit, Treasures of the Bible: The Dead Sea Scrolls and Beyond, in summer 2010.

Special collections of Azusa Pacific University are housed in the Thomas F. Andrews Room of the Hugh and Hazel Darling Library, located on APU's West Campus. The special collections consist of over 6,500 holdings ranging from presidential signatures to historical citrus crate labels.

=== Research ===
Azusa Pacific University is classified among "R2: Doctoral Universities – High research activity". APU conducts its research through eight university research centers:

- Center for Academic Service-Learning and Research
- Center for Research on Ethics and Values (CREV)
- Center for Research in Science (CRIS)
- El Centro Teológico Hispano
- Friends Center
- Center for Vocational Ministry (Undergraduate)
- Office of Faith Integration
- Noel Academy for Strengths-Based Leadership and Education

APU's Office of Institutional Research and Assessment provides resources, training, and consultations designed to help academic and student life departments successfully assess their educational effectiveness. The office also coordinates and facilitates the academic program review process.

=== Honors College ===
APU's Honors College was launched in 2013, with David L. Weeks as dean. An Oxford-style, writing-intensive program, the Honors College grants graduates a second major or minor in Honors Humanities and an honors scholar diploma designation. The program content replaces all general education courses. The Honors College describes its purpose as "liberally educat[ing] the next generation of intellectually-gifted Christian leaders." Students study classic literature including works by Aristotle, Shakespeare, and C.S. Lewis, and are given publication and regional/national presentation opportunities.

== Campus ==
Azusa Pacific University's Azusa campus is situated in the San Gabriel Valley, located 26 miles (42 km) northeast of Los Angeles.

The university also maintains a Los Angeles Regional Site, a Monrovia Regional Site, and five additional off-site regional centers in Southern California:

- Inland Empire Regional Center (San Bernardino)
- Murrieta Regional Center
- San Diego Regional Center
- High Desert Regional Center (Victorville)
- Orange County Regional Center (Orange)

== Athletics ==
Azusa Pacific athletics logo

The Azusa Pacific athletic teams are called the Cougars. The athletics program is transitioning from NCAA Division II to Division III, and from the Pacific West (PacWest) Conference to the Southern California Intercollegiate Athletic Conference (SCIAC). It remains part of the PacWest for the 2025-26 year, competing for NCAA Division II and conference championships (swimming and diving (Pacific Collegiate Swim and Dive Conference), water polo (Golden Coast Conference), and acrobatics and tumbling (National Collegiate Acrobatics and Tumbling Association) also retain their respective affiliations for 2025-26). For 2026-27 and 2027-28, APU will play a SCIAC schedule, along with nonconference games against NAIA and other NCAA Division III schools, while adjusting its operations. In 2028-29, APU expects to be an active DIII member and compete again for NCAA championships.

In addition to bringing back football, APU is launching women’s flag football in 2027, as well as another (yet to be determined) women’s sport.

Azusa Pacific athletics earned eight consecutive Directors’ Cups from 2005-12, with a total of 112 Golden State Athletic Conference championships and 37 NAIA national championships. In NCAA DII, the program added 31 PacWest conference titles and four Great Northwest Athletic Conference football championships.

Current sports include:

Men’s	Women’s
Baseball; Basketball; Cross Country; Football; Soccer; Tennis; Track and Field	Acrobatics and Tumbling; Basketball; Cross Country; Soccer; Softball; Swimming and Diving; Tennis; Track and Field; Volleyball; Water Polo

=== Achievements and Alumni ===
A past eight-time winner of the NAIA's Directors' Cup, APU finished 17th for the second consecutive year in the 2015–16 NCAA Division II Directors' Cup standings. A total of 14 APU athletes have competed in the Olympics, including 2008 decathlon gold medalist Bryan Clay '03, and 50 other alumni have been drafted into other professional sports, including Christian Okoye '87, former Kansas City Chiefs fullback; Stephen Vogt '07, former MLB player and current Cleveland Guardians manager; Kirk Nieuwenhuis '08, Long Island Ducks outfielder; and Terrell Watson '15, San Diego Fleet running back.

== Student body ==
Ethnic Enrollment (Undergraduates, Fall 2025	Percentage
Asian American	14%
Black or African American	7%
Hispanic/Latino American	38%
Native Hawaiian/Pacific Islander	1%
Nonresident Alien	4%
Multiracial American	5%
Unknown	4%
White	26%

Azusa Pacific University’s fall 2025 enrollment consisted of 5,901 students, including 1,869 traditional undergraduates and 4,032 at the graduate and professional levels. The student body represents 50 countries, 46 states (and U.S. territories), and 28 Christian denominations. Approximately 71% of students are female and 29% are male, and the ethnic minority population is 75% of undergraduates and 70% of graduate students.

The most popular fields of study at APU are:

- Nursing
- Psychology
- Humanities
- Business and Management
- Health Sciences

== Student life ==
APU features 20 music ensembles, 11 intramural sports, and about 40 clubs and organizations, including ethnic organizations, performing arts clubs, social clubs, service clubs, academic clubs, athletic clubs, and honors societies, as well as a Student Government Association. The university also hosts military and veteran services, including active duty military and veteran benefits, scholarships, and programs.

=== Music Ensembles ===
Music ensemble offerings include choral ensembles, vocal groups, large ensembles, chamber ensembles, commercial ensembles, and orchestral groups. Music groups require an audition, and perform at local churches as well as state and national orchestral and symphonic events. In addition to these ensembles, the Artist Certificate program offers a conservatory style experience to the School of Music's highest performing musicians.

=== Student Government Association ===
APU's Student Government Association (SGA) is composed of 28 students. The SGA has served APU since 1945 by meeting with offices on campus and conducting surveys that analyze the needs of the APU student body. The SGA's governing structure, listed from highest position to lowest, is composed of a president, five executives, two commissioners, nine senators, and nine representatives.

== Diversity ==
In 2016, APU was recognized by Diverse Issues in Higher Education as one of the nation's top schools in awarding degrees to minority students. The university ranked among the top 100 in 11 baccalaureate categories, and ranked 5th for awarding Hispanic master's degrees in the "business/commerce, general" category, and 55th for total minority master's degrees awarded across all disciplines. APU is recognized by the Hispanic Association of Colleges and Universities as one of 104 Hispanic-Serving Institutions in California.

=== Human Sexuality ===
The university has cited its Christian faith in its beliefs about human sexuality." The policy has been lifted and reinstated a number of times and has been the target of student protests.

As of 2022, University policy states that "God-given sexuality" is to take place in the context of a marriage covenant between a man and a woman.
