= Digital Medievalist =

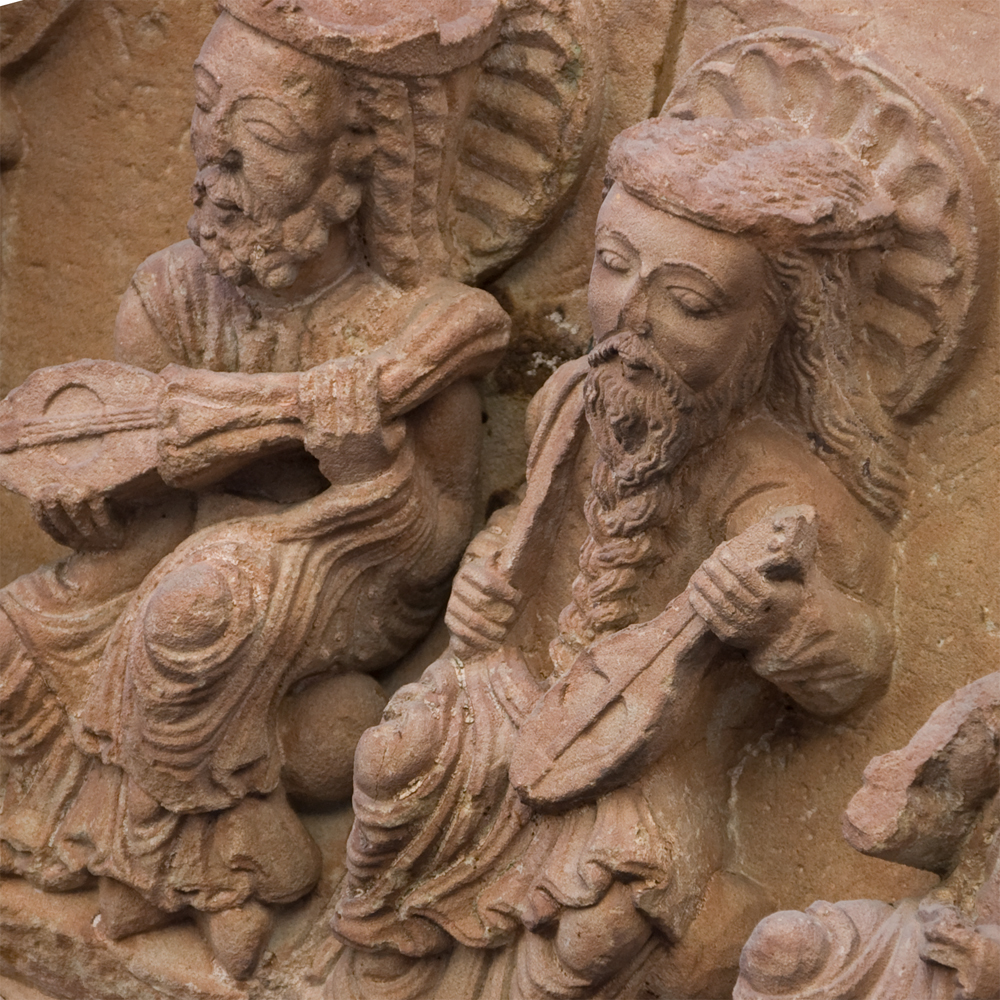
Detail from the arch of the 12th century west portal of the church of Santo Domingo, Soria, Spain

Digital Medievalist is an academic project and community-building organization for those who are interested in the use of computers and computational techniques in the academic field of medieval studies, a sub-field of digital humanities.

== History ==
Digital Medievalist was established in 2003 as an international collaborative non-profit project based at University of Lethbridge in Canada, though it has executive board members from a number of other countries. Although University of Lethbridge remains the main host and administrative home, the project now has a technical infrastructure which uses donated services from others including the University of Kentucky. The project grew out of a recognised need for best-practice advice on a disciplinary level in the creation of digital medieval resources. Although much of the advice and experience of those who would call themselves digital medievalists are applicable to other areas of the digital humanities and specifically academic research projects in this area, around the time of its creation an increasing need for discipline-based communities of this nature was beginning to be recognised. Partly in response to the overwhelming reception the creation of Digital Medievalist received, the Digital Classicist project was set up shortly after.

== Governance ==
=== Executive Board ===
Digital Medievalist as an organization is overseen by the volunteer efforts of a fully elected international executive board. According to its most current bylaws, members of the board are elected by the Digital Medievalist membership for four-year terms, and that the board chooses a director from amongst its members. Eligibility for election to the executive board is simply demonstrable participation in digital medieval activities or board-sanctioned equivalencies. These bylaws also state its commitment to be a non-profit organization, and its general purposes and objectives.

=== Membership ===
Membership in Digital Medievalist is free and open to all. The sole criterion for membership is subscription to its free online discussion list 'dm-l'. Membership conveys the right to vote in Digital Medievalist elections, and if they have contributed in some meaningful manner, eligibility to run for election to the Digital Medievalist executive board.

== Activities ==
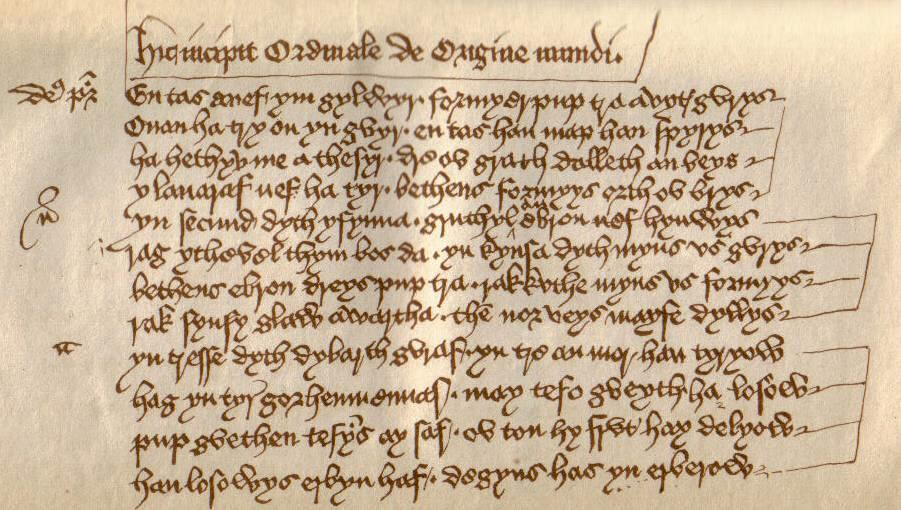
Opening verses of Mediaeval Cornish manuscript, of the Origo Mundi

Digital Medievalist sees it as its mission to provide a framework to enable members of its community to share information. These activities include an electronic mailing list, the participation in and organisation of conference sessions or other events, and a website containing an open-access academic journal of record, a wiki/FAQ, and a facility to post news releases.

=== Mailing list ===
Digital Medievalist runs an electronic mailing list and discussion forum where members of the community ask for advice, share problems, and discuss issues that affect them. As of April 2022, the discussion list has over 1450 members, many of whom are drawn from widely across the Humanities Computing field. The list traffic is low, with occasional bursts of interest in a particular issue, but is primarily used for announcements of interest to digital medievalists.

=== Journal ===
Digital Medievalist runs a free peer-reviewed open-access online journal, also called Digital Medievalist, which acts as a journal of record for the digital medieval studies field. In many ways this is seen as the most significant output of Digital Medievalist and is where the majority of volunteer effort is directed. The journal has an entry in the Directory of Open Access Journals listed under the fields of both computer science and history. The Digital Medievalist ISSN number is 17150736, and University of Lethbridge is listed as the official publisher. In May 2017, the journal moved from its previous domain to the Open Library of Humanities platform. The journal appears to release about one issue every year since 2005. It has experimented with different formats of releases, for example issue 3 is a rolling-release that previously submitted articles are being added to over time, while issue 4 was a thematic issue of articles arising out of the work of a cognate organization Digital Classicist in memory of a well-known academic in the field of digital humanities, Ross Scaife. In addition to experimenting with different models of publication, the project has taken an innovative stance on the problems of academic acceptance of research articles published online. This the use of so-called 'Ostentatious Peer Review', that is, the accepting editor and the recommending reader who reviewed the article have their name listed as doing so. The theory is that both the editors and reviewers do a better job (since their name is in evidence for everyone to see) and also by attracting big names in the medieval studies and/or humanities computing community, the online publication of the article may be taken more seriously by academic hiring and tenure committees. While there is informal hearsay evidence that this might be beneficial, and certainly leads to a higher editorial standard than some online journals, there is no hard evidence (yet) that this affects hiring committees.

=== Conferences and events ===
Digital Medievalist as an umbrella group for a community interested in digital methodologies in medieval studies has been organizing conference sessions at the most prestigious academic medieval studies conferences in existence, for example, the International Congress on Medieval Studies organized by Western Michigan University and the International Medieval Congress organized by the University of Leeds amongst other conferences and events. In 2021, they also organized three virtual conferences, each aligned with a different geographic space and time zone, grouped as The Americas, Asia & Oceania, and Europe & Africa.

== See also ==
- Medieval Unicode Font Initiative
- Digital classics
- International Medieval Congress
- Internet History Sourcebooks Project
