= Romanization of Greek =

Rendering Greek in Latin characters

Romanization of Greek is the transliteration (letter-mapping) or transcription (sound-mapping) of text from the Greek alphabet into the Latin alphabet.

== History ==
The conventions for writing and romanizing Ancient Greek and Modern Greek differ markedly. The sound of the English letter B (/b/) was written as β in ancient Greek but is now written as the digraph μπ, while the modern β sounds like the English letter V (/v/) instead. The Greek name Ἰωάννης became Johannes in Latin and then John in English, but in modern Greek has become Γιάννης; this might be written as Yannis, Jani, Ioannis, Yiannis, or Giannis, but not Giannes or Giannēs as it would be for ancient Greek. The word Άγιος might variously appear as Hagiοs, Agios, Aghios, or Ayios, or simply be translated as "Holy" or "Saint" in English forms of Greek placenames.

Traditional English renderings of Greek names originated from Roman systems established in antiquity. The Roman alphabet itself was a form of the Cumaean alphabet derived from the Euboean script that valued Χ as /ks/ and Η as /h/ and used variant forms of Λ and Σ that became L and S. When this script was used to write the classical Greek alphabet, ⟨κ⟩ was replaced with ⟨c⟩, ⟨αι⟩ and ⟨οι⟩ became ⟨æ⟩ and ⟨œ⟩, and ⟨ει⟩ and ⟨ου⟩ were simplified to ⟨i⟩ (more rarely—corresponding to an earlier pronunciation—⟨e⟩) and ⟨u⟩. Aspirated consonants like ⟨θ⟩, ⟨φ⟩, initial-⟨ρ⟩, and ⟨χ⟩ simply wrote out the sound: ⟨th⟩, ⟨ph⟩, ⟨rh⟩, and ⟨ch⟩. Because English orthography has changed so much from the original Greek, modern scholarly transliteration now usually renders ⟨κ⟩ as ⟨k⟩ and the diphthongs ⟨αι, οι, ει, ου⟩ as ⟨ai, oi, ei, ou⟩.

"Greeklish" has also spread within Greece itself, owing to the rapid spread of digital telephony from cultures using the Latin alphabet. Since Greek typefaces and fonts are not always supported or robust, Greek email and chatting has adopted a variety of formats for rendering Greek and Greek shorthand using Latin letters. Examples include "8elo" and "thelw" for θέλω, "3ava" for ξανά, and "yuxi" for ψυχή.

Owing to the difficulties encountered in transliterating and transcribing both ancient and modern Greek into the Latin alphabet, a number of regulatory bodies have been established. The Hellenic Organization for Standardization (ELOT), in cooperation with the International Organization for Standardization (ISO), released a system in 1983 which has since been formally adopted by the United Nations, the United Kingdom and United States.

== Tables ==
The following tables list several romanization schemes from the Greek alphabet to modern English. Note, however, that the ELOT, UN, and ISO formats for Modern Greek intend themselves as translingual and may be applied in any language using the Latin alphabet.

=== Ancient Greek ===
The American Library Association and Library of Congress romanization scheme employs its "Ancient or Medieval Greek" system for all works and authors up to the Fall of Constantinople in 1453, although Byzantine Greek was pronounced distinctly and some have considered "Modern" Greek to have begun as early as the 12th century.

For treatment of polytonic Greek letters—for example, ᾤ—see also the section on romanizing Greek diacritical marks below.

| Greek | Classical | ALA-LC (2010) | Beta Code |
|---|---|---|---|
| α | a | a | A |
| αι | ae | ai | AI |
| β | b | b | B |
| γ | g | g | G |
| γ | n (Note: Before another velar stop, i.e. in the combinations γγ, γκ, γξ, γχ) | n | G |
| δ | d | d | D |
| ε | e | e | E |
| ει | e or i | ei | EI |
| ζ | z | z | Z |
| η | e | ē | H |
| θ | th | th | Q |
| ι | i | i | I |
| κ | c | k | K |
| λ | l | l | L |
| μ | m | m | M |
| ν | n | n | N |
| ξ | x | x | C |
| ο | o | o | O |
| οι | oe | oi | OI |
| ου | u | ou | OU |
| ου | o | ou | OU |
| π | p | p | P |
| ρ | rh (Note: In ancient Greek, word-initial rho—a rho at the beginning of a word or name—and the second in a pair of medial rhos were always considered to involve rough breathing whether marked or not.) | rh | R |
| ρ | r | r | R |
| σ | s | s | S / S1 |
| ς | s | s | S / S2 / J |
| τ | t | t | T |
| υ | y | y | U |
| υ | u (Note: In the diphthongs αυ, ευ, ηυ, ου, υι, ωυ.) | u | U |
| υι | ui or yi | ui | UI |
| φ | ph | ph | F |
| χ | ch | ch | X |
| ψ | ps | ps | Y |
| ω | o | ō | W |

=== Modern Greek ===
ELOT approved in 1982 the ELOT 743 standard, revised in 2001, whose Type 2 (Greek: Τύπος 2, romanized: Typos 2) transcription scheme has been adopted by the Greek and Cypriot governments as standard for romanization of names on Greek and Cypriot passports. It also comprised a Type 1 (Greek: Τύπος 1, romanized: Typos 1) transliteration table, which was extensively modified in the second edition of the standard.

International version of ELOT 743, with an English language standard document, was approved by the UN (V/19, 1987) and the British and American governments. In 1997 the ISO approved its version, ISO 843, with a different Type 1 transliteration system, which was adopted four years later by ELOT itself, while the U.N. did not update its version. So the transcriptions of Modern Greek into Latin letters used by ELOT, UN and ISO are essentially equivalent, while there remain minor differences in how they approach reversible transliteration.

The American Library Association and Library of Congress romanization scheme employs its "Modern Greek" system for all works and authors following the Fall of Constantinople in 1453.

In the table below, the special rules for vowel combinations (αι, αυ, ει, ευ, ηυ, οι, ου, ωυ) only apply when these letters function as digraphs. There are also words where the same letters stand side by side incidentally but represent separate vowels. In these cases each of the two letters is transcribed separately according to the normal rules for single letters. Such cases are marked in Greek orthography by either having an accent on the first rather than the second vowel letter, or by having a diaeresis ( ¨ ) over the second letter. For treatment of accents and diaereses—for example, ϊ—also see the section on romanizing Greek diacritical marks below.

| Greek | IPA | Transcription | | Transliteration | | | | Notes |
| Greek | IPA | BGN/PCGN (1962) | ELOT 743 (Type 2 - transcription) (1982; 2001) | UN (1987) | ISO (1997) | ELOT 743, 2nd ed. (Type 1 - transliteration) (2001) | ALA-LC (2010) | Notes |
|---|---|---|---|---|---|---|---|---|
| α | [a] | a | a | a | a | a | a | |
| αι | [e̞] | e | ai | ai | ai | ai | ai | |
| αυ | [av] | av | av | av̱ | au | au | au | before vowels or voiced consonants |
| αυ | [af] | av | af | af | au | au | au | before voiceless consonants and word-finally |
| β | [v] | v | v | v | v | v | v | |
| γ | [ɣ] | g | g | g | g | g | g | |
| γ | [ʝ] | y | g | g | g | g | g | before front vowels |
| γγ | [ŋɡ],[ɲɟ] | ng | ng | ṉg | gg | gg | ng | |
| γκ | [g], [ɟ] | g | gk | gk | gk | gk | gk | word-initially |
| γκ | [ŋɡ],[ɲɟ] | ng | gk | gk | gk | gk | ng | word-medially |
| γξ | [ŋks] | nx | nx | ṉx | gx | gx | nx | |
| γχ | [ŋx],[ɲç] | nkh | nch | ṉch | gch | gch | nch | |
| δ | [ð] | dh | d | d | d | d | d | |
| δ | [d] | d | d | d | d | d | d | in the combination νδρ |
| ε | [e̞] | e | e | e | e | e | e | |
| ει | [i] | i | ei | ei | ei | ei | ei | |
| ευ | [e̞v] | ev | ev | ev̱ | eu | eu | eu | before vowels or voiced consonants |
| ευ | [e̞f] | ev | ef | ef | eu | eu | eu | before voiceless consonants and word-finally |
| ζ | [z] | z | z | z | z | z | z | |
| η | [i] | i | i | i̱ | ī | ī / i¯ | ē | |
| ηυ | [iv] | iv | iv | i̱v̱ | īu | īu / i¯u | ēu | before vowels or voiced consonants |
| ηυ | [if] | iv | if | i̱f̱ | īu | īu / i¯u | ēu | before voiceless consonants and word-finally |
| θ | [θ] | th | th | th | th | th | th | |
| ι | [i] | i | i | i | i | i | i | |
| κ | [k], [c] | k | k | k | k | k | k | |
| λ | [l] | l | l | l | l | l | l | |
| μ | [m] | m | m | m | m | m | m | |
| μπ | [b] | b | b | b | mp | mp | b | word-initially |
| μπ | [mb] | mb | mp | mp | mp | mp | mp | word-medially |
| ν | [n] | n | n | n | n | n | n | |
| ντ | [d] | d | nt | nt | nt | nt | ḏ / d_ | word-initially |
| ντ | [nd] | nd | nt | nt | nt | nt | nt | word-medially and word-finally |
| ντ | [nd(z)] | nt | nt | nt | nt | nt | nt | in the combination ντζ |
| ξ | [ks] | x | x | x | x | x | x | |
| ο | [o̞] | o | o | o | o | o | o | |
| οι | [i] | i | oi | oi | oi | oi | oi | |
| ου | [u] | ou | ou | ou | ou | ou | ou | |
| π | [p] | p | p | p | p | p | p | |
| ρ | [r] | r | r | r | r | r | r | |
| σ / ς | [s] | s | s | s | s | s | s | ς (σίγμα τελικό - final sigma) is used as the final letter in a word. |
| τ | [t] | t | t | t | t | t | t | |
| υ | [i] | i | y | y | y | y | y | |
| υι | [i] | i | yi | yi | yi | yi | ui | |
| φ | [f] | f | f | f | f | f | ph | |
| χ | [x], [ç] | kh | ch | ch | ch | ch | ch | |
| ψ | [ps] | ps | ps | ps | ps | ps | ps | |
| ω | [o̞] | o | o | o̱ | ō | ō / o¯ | ō | |
| ωυ | [oi] | oy | oy | o̱y | ōy | ōy / o¯y | ōu | |

=== Diacritical marks ===
The traditional polytonic orthography of Greek uses several distinct diacritical marks to render what was originally the pitch accent of Ancient Greek and the presence or absence of word-initial /h/. In 1982, monotonic orthography was officially introduced for modern Greek. The only diacritics that remain are the acute accent (indicating stress) and the diaeresis (indicating that two consecutive vowels should not be combined).

When a Greek diphthong is accented, the accent mark is placed over the second letter of the pair. This means that an accent over the first letter of the pair indicates vowels which should be taken (and romanized) separately. Although the second vowel is not marked with a superfluous diaeresis in Greek, the first-edition ELOT 743 and the UN systems place a diaeresis on the Latin vowel for the sake of clarity.

Diacritical marks
| Greek | Ancient | | | Modern | | | | | Name |
| Greek | Classical | ALA-LC (2010) | Beta Code (Note: These marks are placed after the letter so that, e.g., Ἐν is written E)N and τῷ is written TW=|.) | ELOT (2001) | UN (1987) | BGN/ PCGN (1996) | ISO (1997) | ALA-LC (2010) | Name |
|---|---|---|---|---|---|---|---|---|---|
| ́ | | | / | ´ (Note: In systems where the υ in αυ, ευ, and ηυ is romanized as a consonant v or f, the stressed diphthongs αύ, εύ, and ηύ are romanized with the accent mark over the initial vowel. This should be distinguished from Greek άυ, έυ, and ήυ, which would be romanized as separate letters and not as diphthongs: áÿ, éÿ, and íÿ or ī́ÿ or í̱ÿ.) | | | | | accent acute accent |
| ̀ | | | \ | ` | —N/a | ´ | ` | | grave accent |
| ῾ | h (Note: In the ALA-LC system, the h is supplied even where the rough breathing is not marked in ancient and medieval Greek (for example, initial ρ was always considered to possess rough breathing) but not in Greek after 1453.: On a vowel: h before the vowel.; On a diphthong: h before the first vowel.; On ρ: h after the r.) | | ( | h | —N/a | | h | h | rough breathing |
| ᾿ | | | ) | ' | —N/a | | ' | | coronis smooth breathing |
| ˜ ̑ | | | = | ˆ | —N/a | ´ | ˆ | | circumflex |
| ¨ | (Note: The diaeresis mark indicates that adjacent vowels should be taken separately and not as a single diphthong.) | | + | ¨ | | | | | diaeresis |
| ͺ | | | | | ¸ | —N/a | | ¸ | | iota subscript |

Apart from the diacritical marks native to Greek itself or used to romanize its characters, linguists also regularly mark vowel length with macrons ( ¯) marking long vowels and rounded breves ( ˘) marking short vowels. Where these are romanized, it is common to mark the long vowels with macrons over the Latin letters and to leave the short vowels unmarked; such macrons should not be confused or conflated with those used by some systems to mark eta and omega as distinct from epsilon, iota, and omicron.

=== Numerals ===
Greece's early Attic numerals were based on a small sample of letters (including heta) arranged in multiples of 5 and 10, likely forming the inspiration for the later Etruscan and Roman numerals.

This early system was replaced by Greek numerals which employed the entire alphabet, including the nonstandard letters digamma, stigma, or sigma-tau (placed between epsilon and zeta), koppa (placed between pi and rho), and sampi (placed after omega). As revised in 2001, ELOT 743 provides for the uncommon characters to be given (in Greek) as $ for stigma, + for koppa, and / for sampi. These symbols are not given lower-case equivalents. When used as numbers, the letters are used in combination with the upper keraia numeral sign ⟨ʹ⟩ to denote numbers from 1 to 900 and in combination with the lower keraia ⟨͵⟩ to denote multiples of 1000. (For a full table of the signs and their values, see Greek numerals.)

These values are traditionally romanized as Roman numerals, so that Αλέξανδρος Γ' ο Μακεδών would be translated as Alexander III of Macedon and transliterated as Aléxandros III o Makedṓn rather than Aléxandros G' or Aléxandros 3. Greek laws and other official documents of Greece which employ these numerals, however, are to be formally romanized using "decimal" Arabic numerals.

=== Punctuation marks ===
Ancient Greek text did not mark word division with spaces or interpuncts, instead running the words together (scripta continua). In the Hellenistic period, a variety of symbols arose for punctuation or editorial marking; such punctuation (or the lack thereof) are variously romanized, inserted, or ignored in different modern editions.

Modern Greek punctuation generally follows French with the notable exception of Greek's use of a separate question mark, the erotimatiko, which is shaped like the Latinate semicolon. Greek punctuation which has been given formal romanizations include:

Punctuation marks
| Greek | ELOT (2001) | ISO (1997) | Name |
|---|---|---|---|
| ; | ? | ? | Greek question mark (erotimatiko) |
| . | . | . | full stop (teleia) |
| · | ; | ; | Greek semicolon (ano teleia) |
| : | : | : | colon (ano kato teleia) |
| , | , | , | comma (komma) |
| ! | ! | | exclamation point (thavmastiko) |
| ’ | ' | ' | apostrophe (apostrofos) |
| ‿ ͜ | - | - | papyrological hyphen (enotikon) |

=== Uncommon letters ===
There are many archaic forms and local variants of the Greek alphabet. Beta, for example, might appear as round Β or pointed throughout Greece but is also found in the forms (at Gortyn), and (Thera), (Argos), (Melos), (Corinth), (Megara and Byzantium), and even (Cyclades). Well into the modern period, classical and medieval Greek was also set using a wide array of ligatures, symbols combining or abbreviating various sets of letters, such as those included in Claude Garamond's 16th-century grecs du roi. For the most part, such variants—as ϖ and for π, ϛ for στ, and ϗ for και—are just silently emended to their standard forms and transliterated accordingly. Letters with no equivalent in the classical Greek alphabet such as heta (Ͱ & ͱ), meanwhile, usually take their nearest English equivalent (in this case, h) but are too uncommon to be listed in formal transliteration schemes.

Uncommon Greek letters which have been given formal romanizations include:

Uncommon letters
| Greek | ISO | ALA-LC | Beta Code | Name |
|---|---|---|---|---|
| Ϝ ϝ Ͷ ͷ | w | w | V | digamma |
| Ϙ ϙ Ϟ ϟ | —N/a | ḳ | #3 | koppa |
| Ϡ ϡ Ͳ ͳ | —N/a | | #5 | sampi |
| Ϻ ϻ | —N/a | | #711 | san |
| Ϲ ϲ | s | s | S / S3 | lunate sigma |
| Ϳ ϳ | j | —N/a | #401 | yot |

== Standardization ==
The sounds of Modern Greek have diverged from both those of Ancient Greek and their descendant letters in English and other languages. This led to a variety of romanizations for names and placenames in the 19th and 20th century. The Hellenic Organization for Standardization (ELOT) issued its system in cooperation with the International Organization for Standardization (ISO) in 1983. This system was adopted (with minor modifications) by the United Nations' Fifth Conference on the Standardization of Geographical Names at Montreal in 1987, by the United Kingdom's Permanent Committee on Geographical Names for British Official Use (PCGN) and by the United States' Board on Geographic Names (BGN) in 1996, and by the ISO itself in 1997. Romanization of names for official purposes (as with passports and identity cards) were required to use the ELOT system within Greece until 2011, when a legal decision permitted Greeks to use irregular forms (such as "Demetrios" for Δημήτριος) provided that official identification and documents also list the standard forms (as, for example, "Demetrios OR Dimitrios"). Other romanization systems still encountered are the BGN/PCGN's earlier 1962 system and the system employed by the American Library Association and the United States' Library of Congress.

== See also ==
- Classical compound
- Cyrillization of Greek
- English words of Greek origin
- Greek alphabet
- List of Latin and Greek words commonly used in systematic names
- Wiktionary's articles on Ancient Greek romanization and pronunciation, numerals, punctuation and Modern Greek transliteration.
