= ISO 843 =

ISO standard

ISO 843 is a system for the transliteration and/or transcription of Greek characters into Latin characters.

It was released by the International Organization for Standardization in 1997. The transcription table is based on the first edition (1982) of the ELOT 743 transcription and transliteration system created by ELOT and officially adopted by the Greek government. The transliteration table provided major changes to the original one by ELOT, which in turn aligned to ISO 843 for the second edition of its ELOT 743 (2001).

== 1997 edition ==
=== Transliteration (Type 1) ===
Greek		Latin		Unicode				Notes
Greek		Latin		Hex		Dec		Notes
Α	α	A	a					
Ά	ά	Á	á	00C1	00E1	193	225	
Β	β	V	v					
Γ	γ	G	g					
Δ	δ	D	d					
Ε	ε	E	e					
Έ	έ	É	é	00C9	00E9	201	233	
Ζ	ζ	Z	z					
Η	η	Ī or I¯	ī or i¯	012A	012B	298	299	
Ή	ή	Ī́ or Í¯	ī́ or í¯	Ī+0301	ī+0301	Ī+769	ī+769	combining acute accent
Θ	θ	TH; Th	th					
Ι	ι	I	i					
Ί	ί	Í	í	00CD	00ED	205	237	
Ϊ	ϊ	Ï	ï	00CF	00EF	207	239	
	ΐ		ḯ		1E2F		7727	
Κ	κ	K	k					
Λ	λ	L	l					
Μ	μ	M	m					
Ν	ν	N	n					
Ξ	ξ	X	x					
Ο	ο	O	o					
Ό	ό	Ó	ó	00D3	00F3	211	243	
Π	π	P	p					
Ρ	ρ	R	r					
Σ	σ, ς	S	s					
Τ	τ	T	t					
Υ	υ	Y	y					
Ύ	ύ	Ý	ý	00DD	00FD	221	253	
Ϋ	ϋ	Ÿ	ÿ	0178	00FF	376	255	
	ΰ		ÿ́		ÿ+0301		ÿ+769	combining acute accent
Φ	φ	F	f					
Χ	χ	CH; Ch	ch					
Ψ	ψ	PS; Ps	ps					
Ω	ω	Ō or O¯	ō or o¯	014C	014D	332	333	
Ώ	ώ	Ṓ or Ó¯	ṓ or ó¯	1E52	1E53	7762	7763	

Exceptions:

- double vowels αυ are transliterated as au. The transliteration could also be "av" or "af", according to https://web.archive.org/web/20110809113951/http://www.passport.gov.gr/elot-743.html
- double vowels ευ are transliterated as eu or eú (with acute accent)
- double vowels ου are transliterated as ou or oú (with acute accent)

=== Transcription (Type 2) ===
ISO 843 also includes a system for transcription, referred to as "Type 2" in the protocol.

== See also ==
- List of ISO standards
- List of ISO transliterations
- Romanization of Greek
