= Barbara McManus =

American classicist (born 1942)

- Born: October 5, 1942; Bethlehem, PA, U.S.
- Died: June 19, 2015 (aged 72); Rye, New York, U.S.

Academic background
- Education: College of New Rochelle (BA); Harvard (PhD)
- Thesis: Inreparabile tempus: A Study of Time in Virgil’s Aeneid (1976)

Academic work
- Discipline: Classics
- Sub-discipline: Latin Literature, Feminism in Classics
- Institutions: College of New Rochelle

Barbara McManus was a professor of classics at The College of New Rochelle and an expert in classics and comparative literature, feminism, mythology, and women in antiquity. She was acknowledged both for her research and for innovative teaching approaches, and had a significant influence on both the teaching and research of women in antiquity, and women as classicists.

== Career ==
Barbara McManus gained her BA from the College of New Rochelle in 1964. She moved to Harvard for her MA in 1965, and PhD in Comparative Literature, which she gained in 1976, writing a thesis on "Inreparabile tempus: A Study of Time in Virgil's Aeneid".

In 1967 she became an instructor in classics at The College of New Rochelle, where she stayed until her retirement in 2000, by which point she had become a professor. She also contributed to the growth of the College of New Rochelle's Women's Studies Program, particularly through the establishment of the newsletter Eos and the Women's Center in 1978. In 1997 she gave the lecture "Crossing The Boundaries Of Gender: Vergil's Aeneid and Augustan Rome," at Hamilton College, funded by the Winslow Lecture Fund. Between 1997 and 2000 she was part of the team who developed the innovative 'VRoma Project', providing Latin resources and an 'interactive virtual Roman world', which was funded by a 'Teaching with Technology' Grant from the NEH, and later became the director of the project until 2015. She also contributed significantly to understanding on female pioneers in Classics, through her research on the life and history of Grace Macurdy, including reenactments of scenes from her life.

Along with this grant, McManus received NEH grants in 1983, 1989, and 2006. She served on various Society for Classical Studies (then called the APA) committees, including the Committees on the Status of Women and Minority Groups, and Outreach. She was elected as a member of the APA Board of Directors (1994–1997) and Vice President for Professional Matters (2001–2005). In 2003-2004 she launched the first census of classics for the APA. In 2009 she was awarded the APA "Distinguished Service Award" for her work on their behalf. She also served as president of the Classical Association of the Atlantic States (CAAS) in 2005, and their webmaster between 2005 and 2010. She also served as vice-president and centennial historian of the New York Classical club, and as webmaster of the Women Writing Women's Lives Biography seminar, both in New York.

McManus was awarded an ovatio by the CAAS in 2001, and in 2011 the same organisation established the "Barbara McManus Leadership Award" in her honour. The Women's Classical Caucus created the annual Barbara McManus Award for the best published article in gender studies each year in her honour in 2012, and in 2016 she became the first recipient of their own Leadership award. She was also recognised with awards from The College of New Rochelle, including their Alumnae Association's Ursula Laurus award in 1994 and in 2014 their "Woman of Achievement" award. In 2012, the University of Maryland hosted an international, interdisciplinary conference in her honour.

== Selected works ==
- Half Human Kind: Contexts and Texts of the Controversy about Women in England 1540-1640 with Katherine Usher Henderson (Urbana: U. of Illinois Press, 1985)
- “Multicentering: The Case of the Athenian Bride,” Helios 17,2 (Autumn 1990) 225–35
- Classics and Feminism: Gendering the Classics (New York: Twayne; London: Prentice Hall, 1997)
- “The VRoma Project: Community and Context for Latin Teaching and Learning,” CALICO Journal 18,2 (2001) 249–68
- The Drunken Duchess of Vassar: Grace Harriett Macurdy, Pioneering Feminist Scholar (Columbus: Ohio State U. Press, 2017).
