= Digital classics =

Digital classics is the application of the tools of digital humanities to the field of classics, or more broadly to the study of the ancient world.

== History ==
Classics was one of the first of the humanities disciplines to adopt computing approaches; the first references to the use of computing in the classical humanities date to the early 1960s, which might be surprising considering the reputation of the discipline as old-fashioned and stuffily traditionalist. Major projects such as the Thesaurus Linguae Graecae, founded in 1972, and the text collections of the Packard Humanities Institute set the trend, and there are still a significantly large number of ancient world projects among Humanities Computing projects today. Also, the success of traditional scholarly publications in digital guises, such as seen in the Bryn Mawr Classical Review, and the early adoption of hypertext in high profile projects like the Perseus Digital Library helped to legitimize computing in the study of classics in ways that has not always been the case in other areas of the humanities.

This apparent paradox may be as a result of the many methodologies and different sources of evidence that classicists have always had to embrace, from literary sources and linguistics, to art history and archaeology, history, philosophy, religious theory, ancient documents such as inscriptions and papyri, and so forth. The fragmentary nature of many of the texts and languages of the ancient world, the scattered evidence from the material culture of ancient Greece and Rome, and the necessity to evaluate all these varieties of evidence in context are particularly likely to benefit from digital approaches such as databases, text markup, image manipulation and machine learning.

== Digital classics projects ==
There are currently several major projects that aim to encourage and develop digital approaches to classical scholarship. The Stoa Consortium at the University of Kentucky distributes news of the discipline, and serves as a peer-reviewed electronic publication venue, and encourages open source approaches to digital classics. The Perseus Project is a digital library that also provides a collection of digital texts and analysis tools to the public; principally (but not exclusively) classical. Digital Classicist is another project and community which shares information and advice about the digital humanities applied to the field of classics. Epigraphy.info is an international open community pursuing a collaborative environment for digital epigraphy.

The Liverpool Classics Mailing List is a project which can be subscribed to in which one receives email regarding Classics events around the world, as well as call for papers, studentships and public lectures.

== See also ==
- Digital Medievalist
- The Alpheios Project
- Pythia (machine learning)
- EpiDoc
