= Diotíma (website) =

Online classical studies resource

Diotíma (formerly Diotima: Materials for the Study of Women and Gender in the Ancient World) is an online resource about "women, gender, sex, sexualities, race, ethnicity, class, status, masculinity, enslavement, disability, and the intersections among them in the ancient Mediterranean world." It is on the server of Women's Classical Caucus, and named after Diotima of Mantinea. It has been favorably reviewed as a resource in the field of classical studies. Founded in 1995, it was the first online portal about women and gender in the ancient world. It was initially edited by Suzanne Bonefas and Ross Scaife; in 2019, Serena Witzke became the editor and moved it to a new URL.
