= Digital Classicist =

Community collaborative project

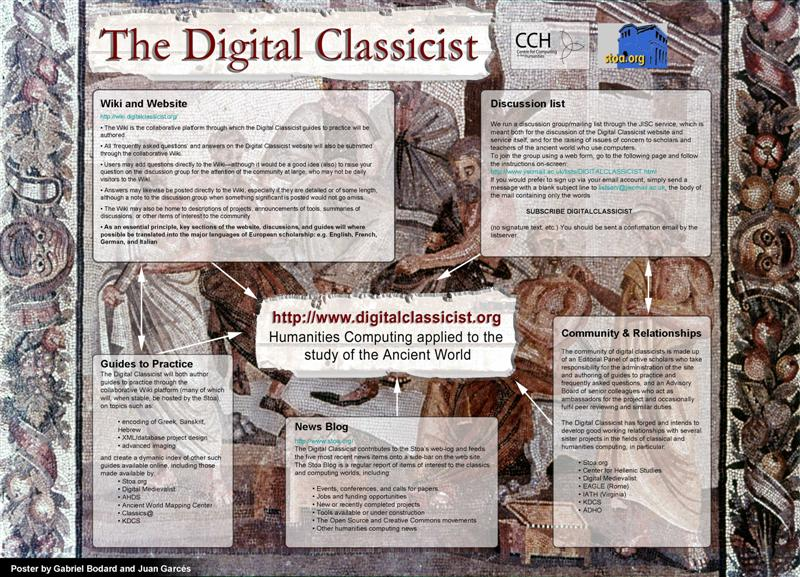
Digital Classicist poster from DRH 2005

The Digital Classicist is a community of those interested in the application of digital humanities to the field of classics and to ancient world studies more generally. The project claims the twin aims of bringing together scholars and students with an interest in computing and the ancient world, and disseminating advice and experience to the classics discipline at large. The Digital Classicist was founded in 2005 as a collaborative project based at King's College London and the University of Kentucky, with editors and advisors from the classics discipline at large.

== Activities of The Digital Classicist ==
=== Membership ===
Many notable Classicists and Digital Humanists are on the advisory board of the Digital Classicist, including Richard Beacham (of the King's Visualisation Lab), Alan Bowman (professor of Ancient History at University of Oxford), Gregory Crane (of the Perseus Project), Bernard Frischer (of the Rome Reborn project), Michael Fulford (professor of Archaeology and pro-vice-chancellor at University of Reading), Willard McCarty (winner of the Lyman Award and professor of Humanities Computing at Department of Digital Humanities), James O'Donnell (provost of Georgetown University), Silvio Panciera (of University of Rome La Sapienza), and Boris Rankov (professor of Ancient History at Royal Holloway, University of London). A former member was the late Ross Scaife (Stoa Consortium and University of Kentucky).

=== Blog ===
The Digital Classicist community have taken an active role in posting news to the long-standing blog of the Stoa Consortium, which concerns itself with both classical and digital humanities topics. A particular focus seems to be the open source and Creative Commons movements, and various communities of scholars with digital interests.

=== Discussion list ===
The Digital Classicist discussion list is hosted by JISCmail in the UK. Most list traffic consists of announcements and calls, with occasional flurries of more involved discussion.

=== Wiki ===
The main website of the Digital Classicist is a gateway containing links to the Digital Classicist wiki and other resources, including listings for seminars and conference panels. The seminar programmes include: abstract, slides (in pdf), audio (in mp3), and, video recordings from 2013.

The project wiki contains lists of digital classics projects, software tools that have been made available for classicists, and a FAQ that solicits collaborative community advice on a range of topics from simple questions about, e.g., Greek fonts and Unicode, word-processing and printing issues, to more advanced Humanities Computing questions and project management advice. The wiki is hosted on the servers of the Centre for Computing in the Humanities at King's College London.

==== DCLP ====
The Digital Corpus of Literary Papyri (DCLP) is an online library that offers information about and transcriptions of Greek and Latin literary and subliterary papyri preserved on papyri, ceramic sherds (ostraka), wooden tablets, and other portable media. DCLP is a joint project of the Institute for Papyrology at the University of Heidelberg and of the Institute for the Study of the Ancient World at New York University.

=== Seminars and Publications ===
The members of the Digital Classicist community also report quite heavily on any conference and seminar activity that they take to reflect well on the project as a whole. Among the events cited are a series of summer seminars that have run each year since 2006 at the Institute of Classical Studies in London, and panels at the Classical Association Annual Conference in Birmingham 2007 Glasgow 2009, Durham 2011, and the Digital Resources in the Humanities and Arts conference in September 2008. The Project was also among the sponsors of the Open Source Critical Editions workshop in 2006.

In 2008 the Digital Medievalist published a collaborative issue of Digital Classicist articles in memory of Ross Scaife. A collection of papers from the 2007 seminar series and conference panels have been published by Ashgate: Digital Research in the Study of Classical Antiquity (Bodard and Mahony (eds) 2010). More recent papers have been collected together in a Bulletin of the Institute of Classical Studies: Mahony and Dunn (eds) 2013The Digital Classicist 2013 (2013) London BICS Supplement-122 Institute of Classical Studies.

== See also ==
- Digital classics
- EpiDoc
- Thesaurus Linguae Graecae
