= Humanities in the United States =

The study of the humanities in the United States includes the study of humanities disciplines such as literature, history, language, performing and visual arts or philosophy.

Many American colleges and universities seek to provide a broad "liberal arts education", in which all college students study the humanities in addition to their specific area of study. Prominent proponents of liberal arts in the United States have included Mortimer J. Adler and E.D. Hirsch.

== Conceptual validity ==
The very concept of the ‘humanities’ as a class or kind, distinct from the ’sciences’, has come under repeated attack in the twentieth century. T.S. Kuhn’s The Structure of Scientific Revolutions argued that the forces driving scientific progress often have less to do with objective inference from unbiased observation than with much more value-laden sociological and cultural factors. More recently, Richard Rorty has argued that the distinction between the sciences and the humanities is harmful to both pursuits, placing the former on an undeserved pedestal and condemning the latter to irrationality. Rorty’s position requires a wholesale rejection of such traditional philosophical distinctions as those between appearance and reality, subjective and objective, replacing them with what he endorses as a new ‘fuzziness’. This leads to a kind of pragmatism where "the oppositions between the humanities, the arts, and the sciences, might gradually fade away... In this situation, ‘the humanities’ would no longer think of themselves as such...."

== Modernism and postmodernism ==
In the United States, the late 20th century saw a challenge to the "elitism" of the humanities, which Edward Said has characterized as a "conservative philosophy of gentlemanly refinement, or sensibility." Such postmodernists argued that the humanities should go beyond the study of "dead white males" to include work by women and people of color, and without religious bias. The French philosopher Michel Foucault has been a very influential part of this movement, stating in The Order of Things that "we can study only individuals, not human nature." However some in the humanities believed that such changes could be detrimental; the result is said to be what E. D. Hirsch Jr. refers to as declining cultural literacy.

== National institutions ==
President Lyndon Johnson signed the National Foundation on the Arts and Humanities Act in 1965, creating the National Council on the Humanities, and funded the National Endowment for the Humanities (NEH) in 1969. NEH is an independent grant-making agency of the United States government dedicated to supporting research, education, preservation, and public programs in the humanities (see Public humanities).

NEH facilitated the creation of State Humanities Councils in the 56 U.S. states and territories. Each council operates independently, defining the "humanities" in relationship to the disciplines, subjects, and values valued in the regions they serve. Councils give grant funds to individuals, scholars, and nonprofit organizations dedicated to the humanities in their region. Councils also offer diverse programs and services that respond to the needs of their communities and according to their own definitions of the humanities.

== Career prospects ==
Criticism of the traditional humanities/liberal arts degree program has been leveled by critics who see them as both expensive and relatively "useless" in the modern American job market, where several years of specialized study is required in most job fields. According to a 2021 report by the Humanities Indicators, in 2018, unemployment rates for humanities majors were modestly higher and their earnings were somewhat lower than the averages for college degree recipients with similar degree levels (though both were still substantially better than for those without a college degree). Their overall levels of satisfaction with their jobs and their lives, however, were essentially the same as graduates from other fields, with more than 85% of humanities graduates reporting they were satisfied with their jobs. As of 2018, more than five million people employed in management and professional jobs had bachelor’s degrees in the humanities. A more recent study found that these trends hold true in almost every state in the nation. Despite these findings, "the humanities have greatly diminished as measured by their share of students earning undergraduate degrees. As of 2020, the humanities were conferring less than 10 percent of all bachelor's degrees, the lowest level on record."

== See also ==
- Social science
