= Janet Marion Martin =

American professor (1938–2023)

- Born: 1938; Bogalusa, Louisiana
- Died: August 30, 2023 (aged 84–85); Princeton, New Jersey
- Occupations: College professor, Latin teacher, medievalist

Janet Marion Martin (1938 – August 30, 2023) was an American college professor. Martin was a professor of classics at Princeton University from 1973 to 2010, and was recognized as an expert on medieval Latin.

== Early life and education ==
Martin was born in Bogalusa, Louisiana, and raised in Middletown, Ohio, the daughter of Bruce Whittington Martin and Edna Poyas Hall Martin. Her father was an engineer and executive in the paper industry. She graduated from Radcliffe College with a bachelor's degree in 1961, and earned a master's degree in classical studies at the University of Michigan in 1963. She completed doctoral studies in medieval Latin at Harvard University in 1968, with a dissertation titled "John of Salisbury and the Classics."

== Career ==
Martin taught at Harvard and at the American Academy in Rome as a young woman, but spent most of her career at Princeton University. She joined the Princeton faculty in 1973, and became the first woman to gain tenure in the classics department there. She was chair of Princeton's women's studies committee, but resigned when she was disappointed in Princeton's minimal commitment to the program. She retired with emerita status in 2010.

Martin frequently taught on women's texts in classical and medieval literature, and was an early and longtime member of the Women's Classical Caucus. In 1996, she co-organized a conference on "Feminism and Classics: Framing the Research Agenda". She was president of the Classical Association of the Atlantic States in 2013–2014, and an active member of the Society for Classical Studies.

== Publications ==
- "John of Salisbury's Manuscripts of Frontinus and of Gellius" (1977)
- "Uses of Tradition: Gellius, Petronius, and John of Salisbury" (1979)
- "Clare College MS. 26 and the Circulation of Aulus Gellius 1-7 in Medieval England and France" (1980, with P. K. Marshall and Richard H. Rouse)
- "John of Salisbury as classical scholar" (1984)
- "Cicero's Jokes at the Court of Henry II of England: Roman Humor and the Princely Ideal" (1990)

== Personal life ==
Martin died in 2023, at the age of 84, at her home in Princeton, New Jersey.
