= Ross Scaife =

American politician (1960–2008)

Allen Ross Scaife
- Born: March 31, 1960; Fredericksburg, Virginia, U.S.
- Died: March 15, 2008 (aged 47); Lexington, Kentucky, U.S.
- Occupation: Professor
- Known for: classics scholar, digital humanities

Allen Ross Scaife (March 31, 1960 – March 15, 2008) was a professor of Classics at the University of Kentucky.

== Life ==
Ross Scaife was born on March 31, 1960, in Fredericksburg, Virginia, to William and Sylvia Scaife, one of four children. He was married to Cathy Jane Edwards Scaife (1959–2018) and they had three sons, Lincoln (b. 1991), Adrian (b. 1994), and Russell (b. 1998). He died of cancer on March 15, 2008, at his home in Lexington, Kentucky.

== Education and scholarship ==
He graduated in 1978 from the Tilton School in New Hampshire and he read Classics and Philosophy at the College of William and Mary. In 1985 he was awarded a Fulbright Fellowship for a year of study at the American School of Classical Studies at Athens, Greece and in 1988 he participated in the summer program at the American Academy in Rome. He earned his PhD in 1990 from the University of Texas at Austin for his thesis on The Kypria and its early reception.

He worked from 1991 to the time of his death at the Department of Modern and Classical Languages, Literature, and Cultures of the University of Kentucky. His primary research and teaching interests were ancient art and material culture, women and gender in Antiquity, as well as Aristophanes and the Greek historians.

Scaife was best known for his pioneering work in the use of computer technology in humanities scholarship. He was the founding editor of the Stoa Consortium for Electronic Publication in the Humanities in 1997, which serves as an umbrella project for many projects in the Classics, such as EpiDoc, the Suda on Line, Diotíma and the Neo-Latin Colloquia. Ross Scaife was a co-creator of the latter three.

A digital humanist, he was instrumental in setting up and driving the Digital Classicist, a partner project hosted at King's College London.

Scaife was dedicated to the principle of open access and he believed in the potential of technology to bring the highest levels of scholarship to the widest possible audience. He also believed in the power of collaborative work, and he was instrumental in building the framework behind projects, such as the Suda on Line, of which he was a founding editor.

Since 2005, he was the director of the Collaboratory for Research in Computing for Humanities at the University of Kentucky. His recent work included forging the collaboration that resulted in the high resolution digital imaging of the Venetus A, a 10th-century manuscript of the Iliad located at the Biblioteca Marciana in Venice, and also the NSF-funded EDUCE project for non-invasive, volumetric scanning technologies for virtually unwrapping and visualizing ancient papyrus scrolls.

His work continues to be influential among scholars working in the field of open access and collaborative editing in Classics, with major projects citing his example and involvement in their inception and design.

== Selected publications ==
- Scaife, A.R., Herodotus on the evolution of Lydia, UTexas M.A. Report 1983.
- Scaife, A.R., "The argument of III.84", AAPhA (1988), p. 25
- Scaife, A.R., "Accounts for taxes on beer and natron. P. Austin inv. 34", ZPE LXXI (1988), pp. 105–109
- Scaife, R., "Alexander i in the Histories of Herodot", Hermes CXVII (1989), pp. 129–137
- Scaife, A.R., The Kypria and its Early Reception, UTexas Ph.D. Thesis 1990.
- Scaife, R., "From kottabos to war in Aristophanes' Acharnians", GRBS 33 (1992), pp. 25–35
- Scaife, A.R., "Ritual and persuasion in the house of Ischomachus", CJ 90.3 (1994–1995), pp. 225–232
- Scaife, R., "The Kypria and its early reception", ClAnt 14.1 (1995), pp. 164–191
- Scaife, R. & Bonefas S., Diotima: materials for the study of women and gender in the ancient world (1995-). Available http://www.stoa.org/diotima/
- Scaife, A.R., "Protagorean frames of reference in Thucydides", AHB 10.1 (1996), pp. 31–37
- Scaife, R., Finkel, R., Hutton, W., Whitehead, D. et al., Suda Online: Byzantine Lexicography (1998-). Available http://www.stoa.org/sol/
- Scaife, R. & Porter, D., "Tools for Collaborative Editing" (2006). Available http://wiki.digitalclassicist.org/OSCE_Scaife_Paper
- Scaife, R. et al., "Directions for the Future" (2007). Audio file available http://www.rch.uky.edu/CenterOfGravity/11_Scaife_future.mp3

== See also ==
- Digital humanities
- Classics
- Digital Classicist
- University of Kentucky
