= Humanities Indicators =

The Humanities Indicators is a project of the American Academy of Arts and Sciences that provides statistical tools for answering questions about humanities education in the United States. Researchers use the Indicators to analyze primary and secondary humanities education, undergraduate and graduate education in the humanities, the humanities workforce, levels and sources of program funding, public understanding and impact of the humanities, and other areas of concern.

Data from the Humanities Indicators has been used in discussions about the US decline in the number of humanities college majors. To address questions about the workforce outcomes of humanities graduates, the Indicators issued reports on the State of the Humanities 2021: Workforce & Beyond.

The Humanities Indicators report examined not only graduates' employment and earnings relative to other fields, but also their satisfaction with their work after graduation and their lives more generally. The data reveal that despite disparities in median earnings, humanities majors are quite similar to graduates from other fields with respect to their perceived well-being. The report was widely cited in the media as an important intervention in the discussion.

In 2019, the Humanities Indicators also administered the first national survey on public attitudes about the humanities, finding wide engagement with the field (though often under different names) and substantial support for the field.
