= Humanities =

Academic disciplines that study society and culture

Humanities are academic disciplines that study aspects of human society and culture, including certain fundamental questions asked by humans. During the Renaissance, the term "humanities" referred to the study of classical literature and language, as opposed to the study of religion or the concept of "divinity". The study of the humanities was a key part of the secular curriculum in universities at the time. Today, the humanities are more frequently defined as any fields of study outside of natural sciences, social sciences, formal sciences (like mathematics), and applied sciences (or professional training). They use methods that are primarily critical, speculative, or interpretative and have a significant historical element—as distinguished from the mainly empirical approaches of science.

The humanities include the academic study of philosophy, religion, history, language arts (literature, writing, oratory, rhetoric, poetry, etc.), the performing arts (theater, music, dance, etc.), and the visual arts (painting, sculpture, photography, filmmaking, etc.).

The word humanities comes from the Renaissance Latin phrase studia humanitatis, which translates to study of humanity. The studia humanitatis was a course of study comprising grammar, literature, rhetoric, history, and moral philosophy, primarily drawn from the study of Latin and Greek classics. The related Latin word humanitas inspired the Renaissance Italian neologism umanisti, or "humanists", which referred to scholars dedicated to these fields and were instrumental in reviving classical learning, a hallmark of "Renaissance humanism." (The term humanist can also describe the philosophical position of humanism, which antihumanist scholars in the humanities reject.)

Historically, the humanities have been distinguished from the social sciences by their methods and objectives. While both fields study human behavior and culture, the humanities adopt an idiographic approach (focusing on the unique and context-specific), emphasizing critical, interpretative, and speculative methods, often with an emphasis on historical context and subjective meaning. In contrast, the social sciences employ a nomothetic approach (seeking general laws and patterns) through empirical and quantitative analysis, a distinction first conceptualized by philosopher Wilhelm Windelband. This methodological distinction, however, is not absolute. Although sociology, anthropology, archaeology, linguistics, and psychology are commonly classified as social sciences, these fields include scholars who employ qualitative methods closely related to those employed by humanities scholars, such as narrative inquiry, textual analysis, or historical methods.

The humanities have also been justified as fostering self-reflection, civic responsibility, and cultural continuity. Though debates persist about the practical utility of the humanities, proponents argue that their unique focus on meaning, creativity, and critical inquiry contributes both to individual enrichment and the public sphere.

== Fields ==
=== Classics ===
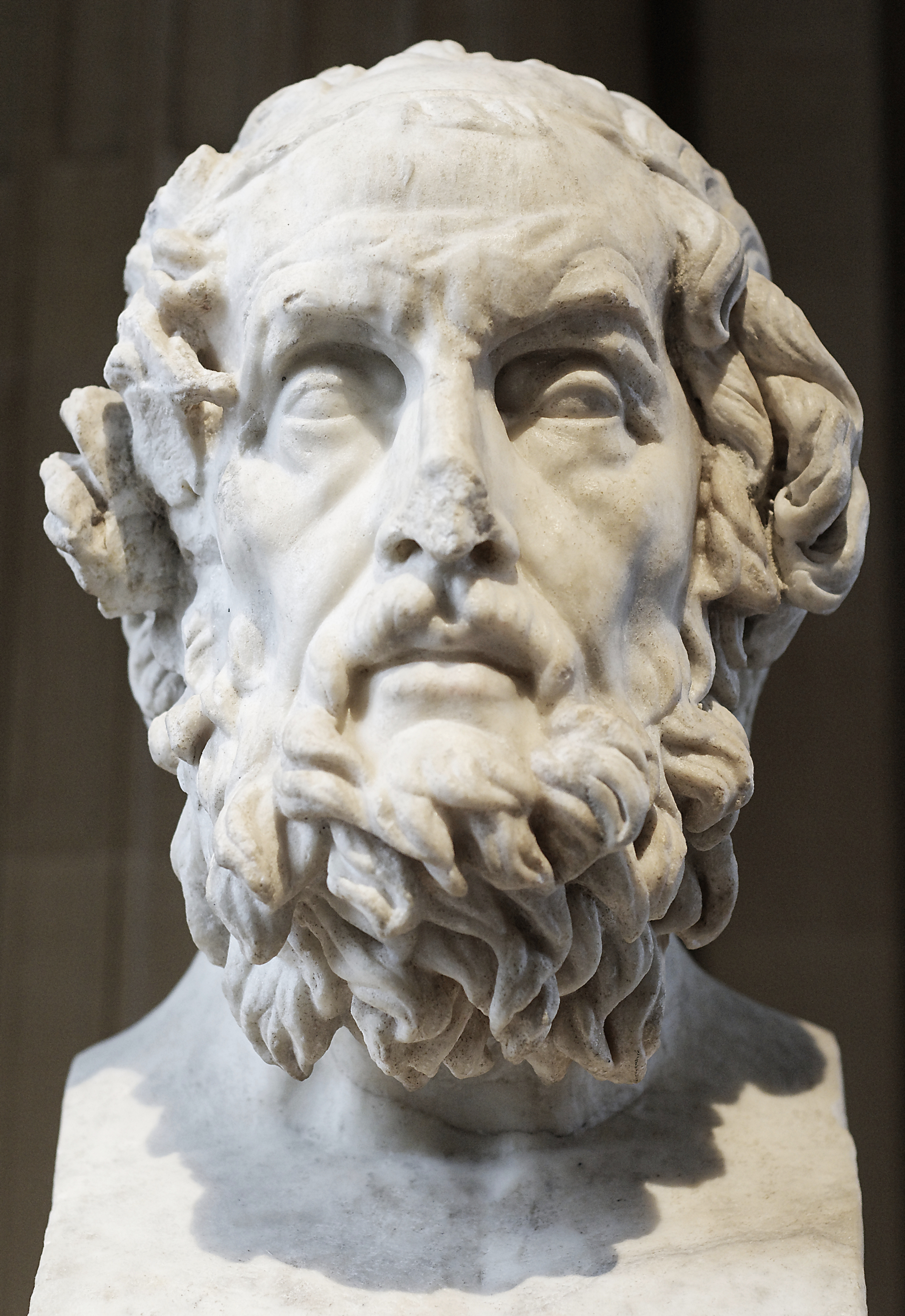
Bust of Homer, the most famous Greek poet

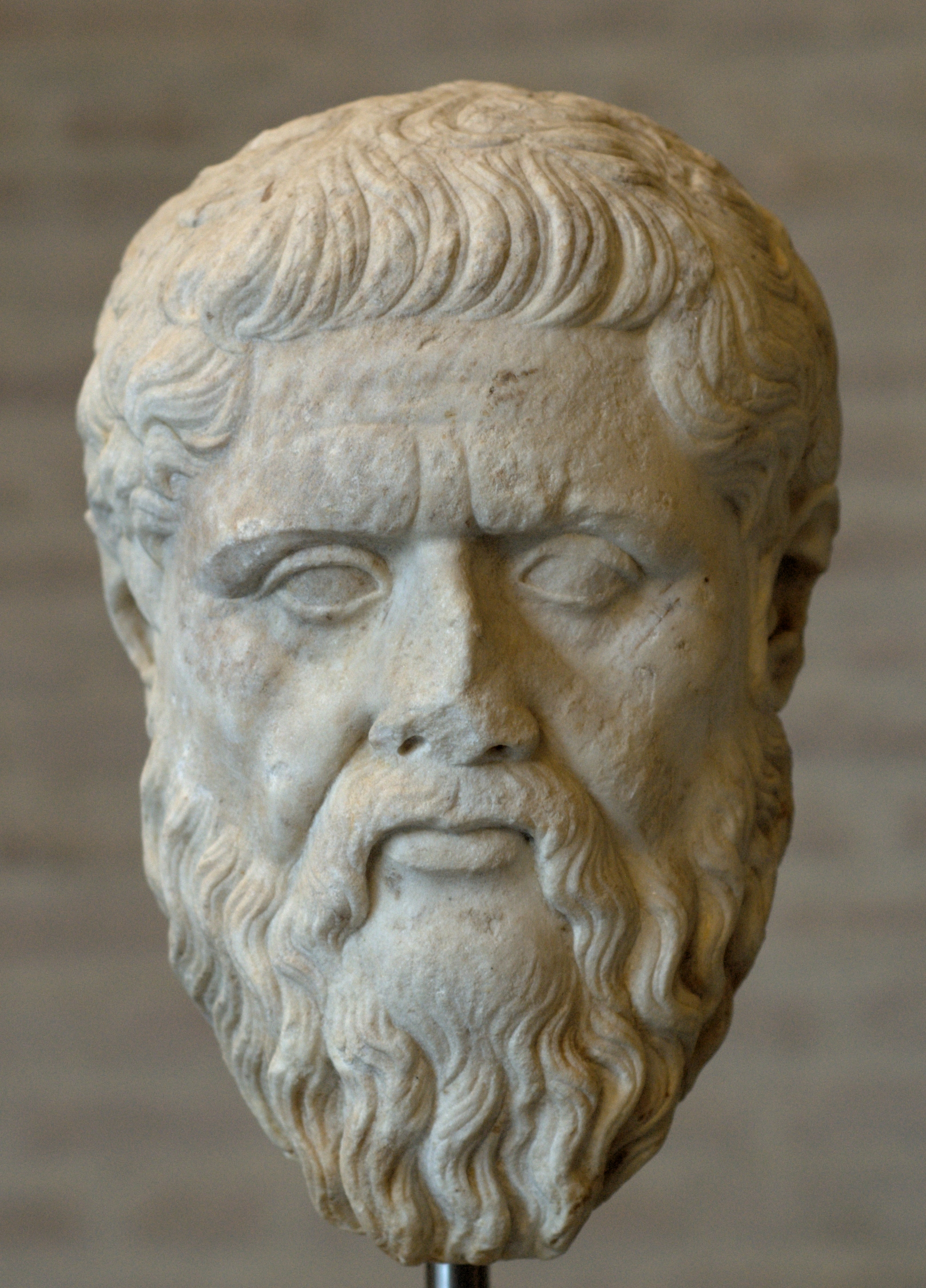
The philosopher Plato depicted in a Roman copy of a work by Silanion for the Academia in Athens (c. 370 BC)

Classics, in the Western academic tradition, refers to the studies of the cultures of classical antiquity, namely Ancient Greek and Latin and the Ancient Greek and Roman cultures. Classical studies are considered one of the cornerstones of the humanities; however, their popularity declined during the 20th century. Nevertheless, the influence of classical ideas on many humanities disciplines, such as philosophy and literature, remains strong.

=== History ===
History is systematically collected information about the past. When used as the name of a field of study, history refers to the study and interpretation of the record of humans, societies, institutions, and any topic that has changed over time.

Traditionally, the study of history has been considered a part of the humanities. In modern academia, history can occasionally be classified as a social science, though this definition is contested.

=== Language ===
While the scientific study of language is known as linguistics and is generally considered a social science, a natural science or a cognitive science, the study of languages is also central to the humanities. A good deal of twentieth- and twenty-first-century philosophy has been devoted to the analysis of language and to the question of whether, as Wittgenstein claimed, many of our philosophical confusions derive from the vocabulary we use; literary theory has explored the rhetorical, associative, and ordering features of language; and historical linguists have studied the development of languages across time. Literature, covering a variety of uses of language including prose forms (such as the novel), poetry and drama, also lies at the heart of the modern humanities curriculum. College-level programs in a foreign language usually include the study of important works of literature in that language, as well as the language itself.

=== Law ===
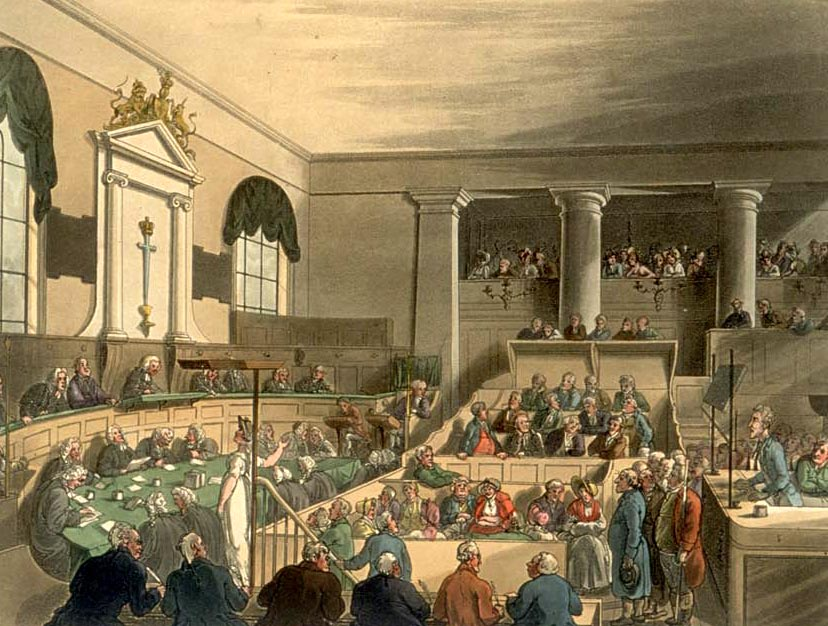
A trial at a criminal court, the Old Bailey in London

In everyday language, law refers to a rule that is enforced by a governing institution, as opposed to a moral or ethical rule that is not subject to formal enforcement. The study of law can be seen as either a social science or a humanities discipline, depending on one's perspective. Some see it as a social science because of its objective and measurable nature, while others view it as a humanities discipline because of its focus on values and interpretation. Law is not always enforceable, especially in the context of international relations. Law has been defined in various ways, such as "a system of rules", "an interpretive concept" for achieving justice, "an authority" to mediate between people's interests, or "the command of a sovereign" backed by the threat of punishment.

However one likes to think of law, it is a completely central social institution. The practical application of ideas from many social science and humanities disciplines, including philosophy, history, political science, economics, anthropology, and sociology, shapes legal policy. Law is politics, because politicians create it. Law is philosophy, because moral and ethical persuasions shape their ideas. Law tells many of history's stories, because statutes, case law, and codifications build up over time. Law is also economics, because any rule about contract, tort, property law, labour law, company law, and many more can have long-lasting effects on how productivity is organised and the distribution of wealth. The noun law derives from the Old English word lagu, meaning something laid down or fixed, and the adjective legal comes from the Latin word LEX.

=== Literature ===
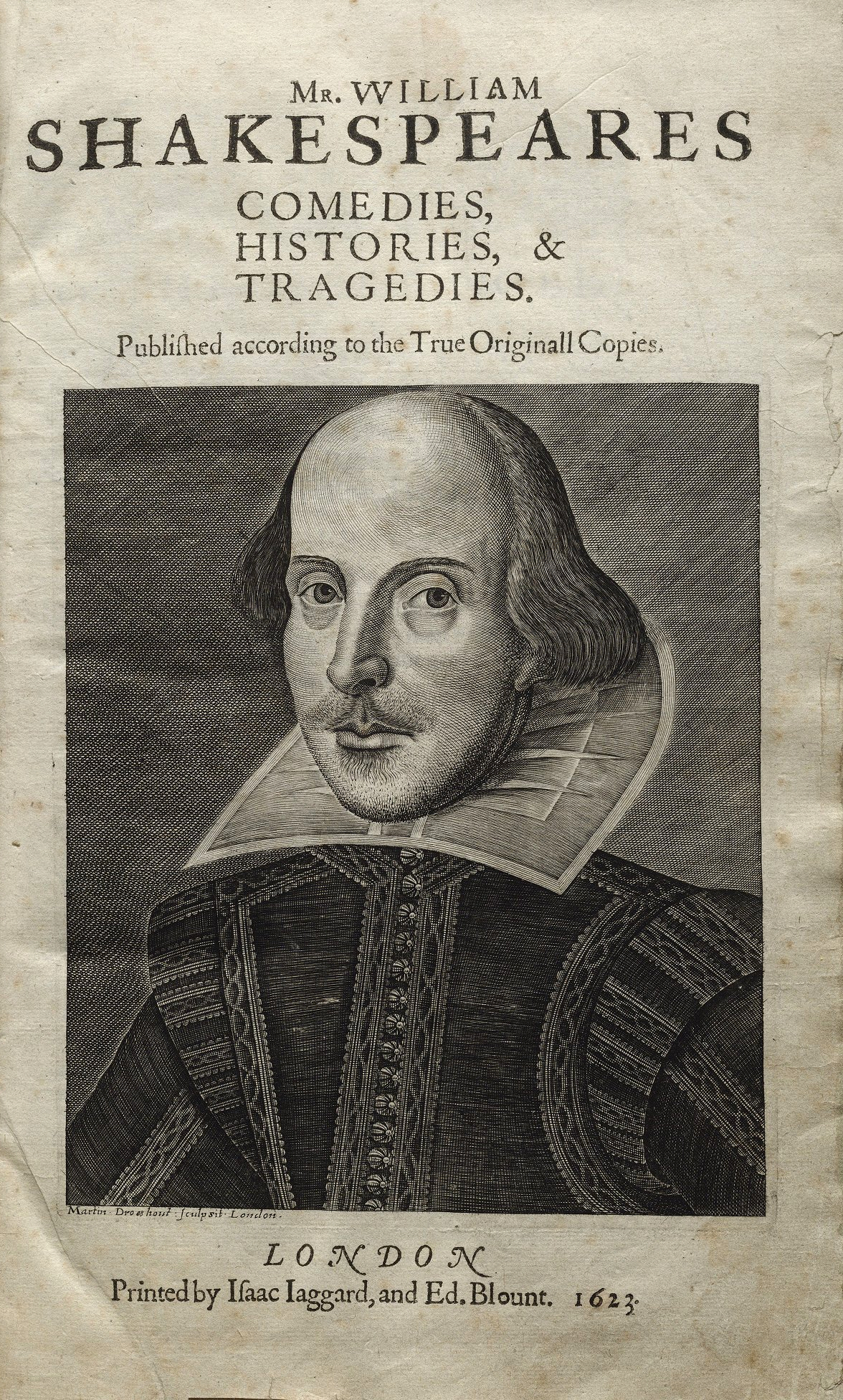
William Shakespeare authored some of the most acclaimed works in English literature.

Literature is a term that does not have a universally accepted definition, but which has variably included all written work; writing that possesses literary merit; and language that emphasizes its own literary features, as opposed to ordinary language. Etymologically the term derives from the Latin word literatura/litteratura which means "writing formed with letters", although some definitions include spoken or sung texts. Literature can be classified as fiction or non-fiction; poetry or prose. It can be further distinguished according to major forms such as the novel, short story, or drama. Works are often categorised according to historical periods or to their adherence to certain aesthetic features or expectations (genre).

=== Philosophy ===
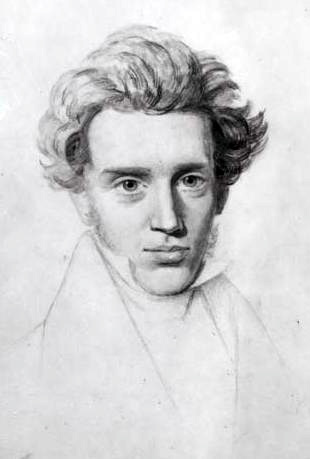
The works of Søren Kierkegaard overlap into many fields of the humanities, such as philosophy, literature, theology, music, and classical studies.

Philosophy—etymologically, the "love of wisdom"—is generally the study of problems concerning matters such as existence, knowledge, justification, truth, justice, right and wrong, beauty, validity, mind, and language. Philosophy is distinguished from other ways of addressing these issues by its critical, generally systematic approach and its reliance on reasoned argument, rather than on experiments (with experimental philosophy as an exception).

Philosophy used to be a very broad term, encompassing what have since become separate disciplines, such as physics. (As Immanuel Kant noted, "Ancient Greek philosophy was divided into three sciences: physics, ethics, and logic.") Today, the main fields of philosophy are logic, ethics, metaphysics, and epistemology. Still, it overlaps with other disciplines. The field of semantics, for example, brings philosophy into contact with linguistics.

Since the early twentieth century, philosophy in English-speaking universities has moved away from the humanities and closer to the formal sciences, becoming much more analytic. Analytic philosophy is marked by emphasis on the use of logic and formal methods of reasoning, conceptual analysis, and the use of symbolic and/or mathematical logic, as contrasted with the Continental style of philosophy. This method of inquiry is largely indebted to the work of philosophers such as Gottlob Frege, Bertrand Russell, G.E. Moore, and Ludwig Wittgenstein.

=== Religion ===
Based on current knowledge, it seems that all known cultures, both in the past and present, have some form of belief system or religious practice. While there may be isolated individuals or groups who do not practice any religion, it is unknown whether there has ever been a society entirely devoid of religious belief. The definition of religion is not universal, and different cultures may have different ideas about what constitutes religion. Religion may be characterized with a community since humans are social animals. Rituals are used to bound the community together. Social animals require rules. Ethics is a requirement of society, but not a requirement of religion. Shinto, Daoism, and other folk or natural religions do not have ethical codes. While some religions do include the concept of deities, others do not. Therefore, the supernatural does not necessarily require the existence of deities. Rather, it can be broadly defined as any phenomenon that cannot be explained by science or reason. Magical thinking creates explanations not available for empirical verification. Stories or myths are narratives being both didactic and entertaining. They are necessary for understanding the human predicament. Some other possible characteristics of religion are pollutions and purification, the sacred and the profane, sacred texts, religious institutions and organizations, and sacrifice and prayer. Some of the major problems that religions confront, and attempts to answer, are chaos, suffering, evil, and death.

The non-founder religions are Hinduism, Shinto, and native or folk religions. Founder religions are Judaism, Christianity, Islam, Confucianism, Daoism, Mormonism, Jainism, Zoroastrianism, Buddhism, Sikhism, and the Baháʼí Faith. Religions must adapt over generations to remain relevant to their adherents. When traditional religions fail to address new concerns, then new religions will emerge.

=== Performing arts ===
The performing arts differ from the visual arts in that the former uses the artist's own body, face, and presence as a medium. The latter uses materials such as clay, metal, or paint, which can be molded or transformed to create a work of art. Performing arts include acrobatics, comedy, dance, magic, music, opera, juggling, marching arts, such as brass bands, and theatre.

Artists who participate in these arts in front of an audience are called performers, including actors, comedians, dancers, musicians, and singers. Performing arts are also supported by workers in related fields, such as songwriting and stagecraft. Performers often adapt their appearance, such as through costumes and stage makeup. There is also a specialized form of fine art in which the artists perform their work live to an audience. This is called Performance art. Most performance art also involves some form of plastic art, perhaps in the creation of props. Dance was often referred to as a plastic art during the Modern dance era.

==== Musicology ====
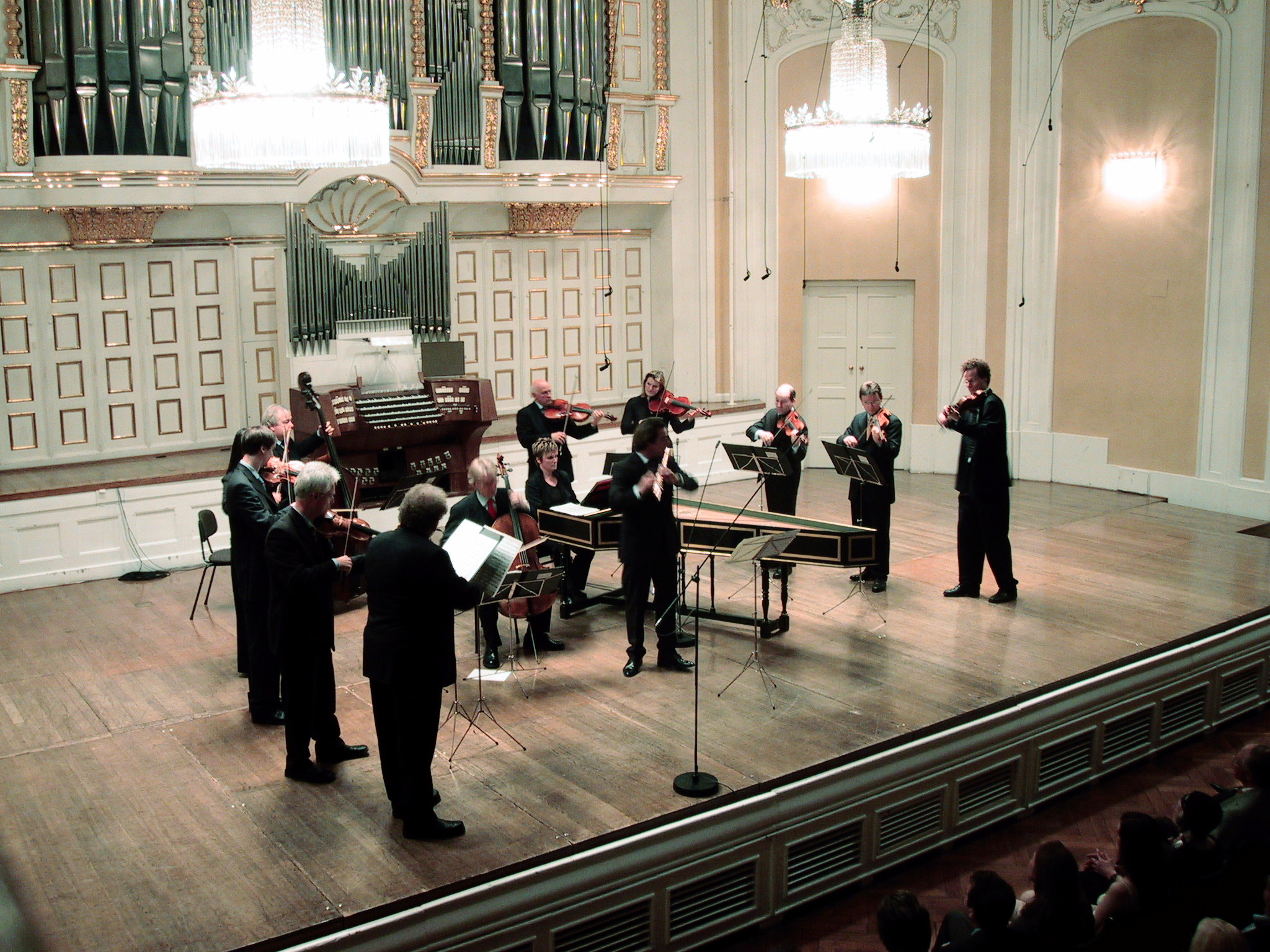
A concert at Mozarteum University Salzburg in Salzburg, Austria

Musicology as an academic discipline can take several paths, including historical musicology, music literature, ethnomusicology, and music theory. Undergraduate music majors generally take courses in all of these areas, while graduate students focus on a particular path. In the liberal arts tradition, musicology is also used to broaden the skills of non-musicians by teaching them skills such as concentration and listening.

==== Theatre ====
Theatre (or theater) (Greek "theatron", θέατρον) is the branch of the performing arts concerned with acting out stories in front of an audience using combinations of speech, gesture, music, dance, sound and spectacle — indeed any one or more elements of the other performing arts. In addition to the standard narrative dialogue style, theatre takes such forms as opera, ballet, mime, kabuki, classical Indian dance, Chinese opera, mummers' plays, and pantomime.

==== Dance ====
Dance (from Old French dancier, perhaps from Frankish) generally refers to human movement either used as a form of expression or presented in a social, spiritual or performance setting. Dance is also used to describe methods of non-verbal communication (see body language) between humans or animals (bee dance, mating dance), and motion in inanimate objects (the leaves danced in the wind). Choreography is the process of creating dances, and the people who create choreography are known as choreographers. Choreographers use movement, music, and other elements to create expressive and artistic dances. They may work alone or with other artists to create new works, and their work can be presented in a variety of settings, from small dance studios to large theaters.

Definitions of what constitutes dance are dependent on social, cultural, aesthetic, artistic, and moral constraints and range from functional movement (such as Folk dance) to codified, virtuoso techniques such as ballet.

=== Visual arts ===
==== History of visual arts ====
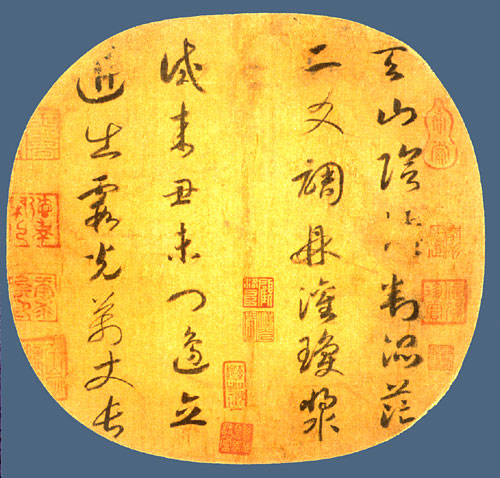
Quatrain on Heavenly Mountain by Emperor Gaozong (1107–1187) of Song dynasty; fan mounted as album leaf on silk, four columns in cursive script.

The great traditions in art have a foundation in the art of one of the ancient civilizations, such as Ancient Japan, Greece and Rome, China, India, Greater Nepal, Mesopotamia and Mesoamerica.

Ancient Greek art saw a veneration of the human physical form and the development of equivalent skills to show musculature, poise, beauty, and anatomically correct proportions. Ancient Roman art depicted gods as idealized humans, shown with characteristic distinguishing features (e.g., Zeus' thunderbolt).

The emphasis on spiritual and religious themes in Byzantine and Gothic art of the Middle Ages reflected the church's dominance. However, in the Renaissance, a renewed focus on the physical world was reflected in art forms that depicted the human body and landscape in a more naturalistic, three-dimensional manner.

Eastern art has generally worked in a style akin to Western medieval art, namely a concentration on surface patterning and local colour (meaning the plain colour of an object, such as basic red for a red robe, rather than the modulations of that colour brought about by light, shade and reflection). A characteristic of this style is that the local colour is often defined by an outline (a contemporary equivalent is the cartoon). This is evident, for example, in the art of India, Tibet, and Japan.

Religious Islamic art forbids iconography, and expresses religious ideas through geometry instead. The physical and rational certainties depicted by the 19th-century Enlightenment were shattered not only by discoveries of relativity by Einstein and of unseen psychology by Freud, but also by unprecedented technological development. Increasing global interaction during this time led to a comparable influence of other cultures on Western art.

==== Media types ====
===== Drawing =====
Drawing is a means of making a picture, using a wide variety of tools and techniques. It generally involves making marks on a surface by applying pressure with a tool or moving it across the surface. Common tools are graphite pencils, pen and ink, inked brushes, wax color pencils, crayons, charcoals, pastels, and markers. Digital tools that simulate these effects are also used. The main techniques used in drawing are: line drawing, hatching, crosshatching, random hatching, scribbling, stippling, and blending. A computer-aided designer who excels in technical drawing is referred to as a draftsman or draughtsman.

===== Painting =====
Mona Lisa, by Leonardo da Vinci, is one of the most recognizable artistic paintings in the world.

Literally, painting is the practice of applying pigment suspended in a carrier (or medium) and a binding agent (a glue) to a surface (support) such as paper, canvas or a wall. However, when used in an artistic sense, it means the use of this activity in combination with drawing, composition, and other aesthetic considerations to manifest the expressive and conceptual intention of the practitioner. Painting has been used throughout history to express spiritual and religious ideas, from mythological scenes on pottery to the frescoes of the Sistine Chapel, to body art.

Colour is highly subjective but has observable psychological effects that can differ from one culture to the next. Black is associated with mourning in the West, but elsewhere, white may be. Some painters, theoreticians, writers and scientists, including Goethe, Kandinsky, Isaac Newton, have written their own colour theories. Moreover, the use of language is only a generalization for a colour equivalent. The word "red", for example, can cover a wide range of variations on the pure red of the spectrum. Unlike music, where notes such as C or C# are universally accepted, there is no formalized register of colors. However, the Pantone system is widely used in the printing and design industry to standardize color reproduction.

Modern artists have extended the practice of painting considerably to include, for example, collage. This began with cubism and is not painting in a strict sense. Some modern painters incorporate different materials such as sand, cement, straw or wood for their texture. Examples of these are the works of Jean Dubuffet or Anselm Kiefer. Modern and contemporary art has moved away from the historic value of craft in favour of concept (conceptual art); this has led some e.g., Joseph Kosuth to say that painting, as a serious art form, is dead, although this has not deterred the majority of artists from continuing to practise it either as whole or part of their work.

Sculpture involves creating three-dimensional forms out of various materials. These typically include malleable substances like clay and metal, but may also extend to materials that are cut or shaved into the desired form, such as stone and wood.

== History of humanities ==
In the West, the history of the humanities can be traced to ancient Greece, where they formed the basis of a broad education for citizens. During Roman times, the concept of the seven liberal arts evolved, involving grammar, rhetoric and logic (the trivium), along with arithmetic, geometry, astronomy and music (the quadrivium). These subjects formed the bulk of medieval education, with the emphasis being on the humanities as skills or "ways of doing".

A major shift occurred with the Renaissance humanism of the fifteenth century, when the humanities began to be regarded as subjects to study rather than practice, with a corresponding shift away from traditional fields into areas such as literature and history (studia humaniora). In the 20th century, this view was in turn challenged by the postmodernist movement, which sought to redefine the humanities in more egalitarian terms suitable for a democratic society since the Greek and Roman societies in which the humanities originated were elitist and aristocratic.

In China, the classical period from around 551 BCE to 220 CE had different categories of learning. One of these was the Four Branches, a traditional system for organizing written knowledge such as classical texts, present before scholarship was divided into the modern humanities disciplines. Another is known as the Six Arts, which includes a set of skills: ritual, music, archery, charioteering, writing, and mathematics. Although these don't fit the definition of humanities today, since then, humanities were officially recognized in the late 19th century. The modern university disciplines were established through multiple education reforms that took inspiration from Western and Japanese models.

A distinction is usually drawn between the social sciences and the humanities. Classicist Allan Bloom writes in The Closing of the American Mind (1987):

Social science and humanities have a mutual contempt for one another, the former looking down on the latter as unscientific, the latter regarding the former as philistine. […] The difference comes down to the fact that social science really wants to be predictive, meaning that man is predictable, while the humanities say that he is not.

== Today ==
=== Education and employment ===
For many decades, there has been a growing public perception that a humanities education inadequately prepares graduates for employment. The common belief is that graduates from such programs face underemployment and that incomes are too low for a humanities education to be worth the investment.

Humanities graduates find employment in a wide variety of management and professional occupations. In Britain, for example, over 11,000 humanities majors found employment in the following occupations:

- Education (25.8%)
- Management (19.8%)
- Media/literature/arts (11.4%)
- Law (11.3%)
- Finance (10.4%)
- Civil service (5.8%)
- Not-for-profit (5.2%)
- Marketing (2.3%)
- Medicine (1.7%)
- Other (6.4%)

Many humanities graduates may find themselves with no specific career goals upon graduation, which can lead to lower incomes in the early stages of their careers. On the other hand, graduates from more career-oriented programs often find jobs more quickly. However, the long-term career prospects of humanities graduates may be similar to those of other graduates, as research shows that by five years after graduation, they generally find a career path that appeals to them.

There is empirical evidence that graduates from humanities programs earn less than graduates from other university programs. However, the empirical evidence also shows that humanities graduates still earn notably higher incomes than workers with no postsecondary education, and have job satisfaction levels comparable to their peers from other fields. Humanities graduates also earn more as their careers progress; ten years after graduation, the income difference between humanities graduates and graduates from other university programs is no longer statistically significant. Humanities graduates can boost their incomes if they obtain advanced or professional degrees.

Humanities majors are sought after in many areas of business, specifically for their critical thinking and problem-solving skills. Research has shown that humanities majors are especially adept at "soft skills" such as "written and oral communication, creative problem-solving, teamwork, decision-making, self-management, and critical analysis".

=== In the United States ===
==== The Humanities Indicators ====
The Humanities Indicators, unveiled in 2009 by the American Academy of Arts and Sciences, are the first comprehensive compilation of data about the humanities in the United States, providing scholars, policymakers and the public with detailed information on humanities education from primary to higher education, the humanities workforce, humanities funding and research, and public humanities activities. Modeled after the National Science Board's Science and Engineering Indicators, Humanities Indicators are a source of reliable benchmarks to guide analysis of the state of the humanities in the United States.

==== The Humanities in American Life ====
The 1980 United States Rockefeller Commission on the Humanities described the humanities in its report "The Humanities in American Life":

Through the humanities we reflect on the fundamental question: What does it mean to be human? The humanities offer clues but never a complete answer. They reveal how people have tried to make moral, spiritual, and intellectual sense of a world where irrationality, despair, loneliness, and death are as conspicuous as birth, friendship, hope, and reason.

==== In liberal arts education ====
The Commission on the Humanities and Social Sciences 2013 report, "The Heart of the Matter", supports the notion of a broad "liberal arts education" that includes study in disciplines ranging from the natural sciences to the arts and the humanities.

Many colleges provide such an education; some require it. The University of Chicago and Columbia University were among the first schools to require an extensive core curriculum in philosophy, literature, and the arts for all students. Other colleges with nationally recognized, mandatory programs in the liberal arts are Fordham University, St. John's College, Saint Anselm College and Providence College. Prominent proponents of liberal arts in the United States have included Mortimer J. Adler and E. D. Hirsch, Jr.

==== As a major ====
In 1950, 1.2% of Americans aged 22 had earned a degree in the humanities. By 2010, this figure had risen to 2.6%. This represents a doubling of the number of Americans with degrees in the humanities over a 60-year period. The increase in the number of Americans with humanities degrees is in part due to the overall rise in college enrollment in the United States. In 1940, 4.6% of Americans had a four-year degree, but by 2016, this figure had risen to 33.4%. This means that the total number of Americans with college degrees has increased significantly, resulting in a greater number of people with degrees in the humanities as well. The proportion of degrees awarded in the humanities has declined in recent decades, even as the overall number of people with humanities degrees has increased. In 1954, 36% of Harvard undergraduates majored in the humanities, but in 2012, only 20% did so. As recently as 1993, the humanities accounted for 15% of the bachelor's degrees awarded by colleges and universities in the United States. As of 2022, they accounted for less than 9%.

==== In the Digital Age ====
Computing has been intersecting with the humanities since 1946, but it took until the 90s for technology to become particularly useful in this department through increased storage and processing capabilities. Now, researchers in the humanities have developed numerous large- and small-scale digital corporations, such as digitized libraries and collections of historical texts, along with digital tools and methods for analyzing them. Their aim is both to uncover new knowledge and to visualize research data in new and revealing ways. Much of this activity occurs in a field called the digital humanities.

==== STEM ====
Politicians in the United States currently espouse a need for increased funding of the STEM fields, science, technology, engineering, and mathematics. Federal funding represents a much smaller fraction of funding for the humanities than other fields, such as STEM or medicine. The result was a decline in quality in both college and pre-college education in the humanities field.

Three-term Louisiana Governor Edwin Edwards acknowledged the importance of the humanities in a 2014 video address to the academic conference "Revolutions in Eighteenth-Century Sociability", Edwards said:

Without the humanities to teach us how history has succeeded or failed in directing the fruits of technology and science to the betterment of our tribe of homo sapiens, without the humanities to teach us how to frame the discussion and to properly debate the uses-and the costs-of technology, without the humanities to teach us how to safely debate how to create a more just society with our fellow man and woman, technology and science would eventually default to the ownership of—and misuse by—the most influential, the most powerful, the most feared among us.

=== In Europe ===
==== The value of the humanities debate ====
The contemporary debate in the field of critical university studies centers around the declining value of the humanities. As in America, there is a perceived decline in interest within higher education policy in research that is qualitative and does not produce marketable products. This threat can be seen in a variety of forms across Europe, but much critical attention has been paid to research assessment in particular. For example, the UK [Research Excellence Framework] has been subject to criticism due to its assessment criteria from across the humanities and, indeed, the social sciences. In particular, the notion of "impact" has generated significant debate.

== Philosophical history ==
=== Citizenship and self-reflection ===
Since the late 19th century, a central justification for the humanities has been that they aid and encourage self-reflection—a self-reflection that, in turn, helps develop personal consciousness or an active sense of civic duty.

Wilhelm Dilthey and Hans-Georg Gadamer centered the humanities' attempt to distinguish itself from the natural sciences in humankind's urge to understand its own experiences. This understanding, they claimed, ties like-minded people from similar cultural backgrounds together and provides a sense of cultural continuity with the philosophical past.

Scholars in the late 20th and early 21st centuries extended that "narrative imagination" to the ability to understand the records of lived experiences outside of one's own individual social and cultural context. Through that narrative imagination, it is claimed, humanities scholars and students develop a conscience more suited to the multicultural world we live in. That conscience might take the form of a passive one that allows more effective self-reflection or extend into active empathy that facilitates the dispensation of civic duties a responsible world citizen must engage in. There is disagreement, however, on the level of influence humanities study can have on an individual and whether or not the understanding produced in humanistic enterprise can guarantee an "identifiable positive effect on people".

=== Humanistic theories and practices ===
There are three major branches of knowledge: natural sciences, social sciences, and the humanities. Technology is the practical extension of the natural sciences, as politics is the extension of the social sciences. Similarly, the humanities have their own practical extension, sometimes called "transformative humanities" (transhumanities) or "culturonics" (Mikhail Epstein's term):

- Nature – natural sciences – technology – transformation of nature
- Society – social sciences – politics – transformation of society
- Culture – human sciences – culturonics – transformation of culture

Technology, politics, and culturonics are designed to transform what their respective disciplines study: nature, society, and culture. The field of transformative humanities includes various practicies and technologies, for example, language planning, the construction of new languages, like Esperanto, and invention of new artistic and literary genres and movements in the genre of manifesto, like Romanticism, Symbolism, or Surrealism.

=== Truth and meaning ===
The divide between humanistic study and the natural sciences also informs arguments about meaning in the humanities. What distinguishes the humanities from the natural sciences is not a certain subject matter, but rather the mode of approach to any question. The humanities focus on understanding meaning, purpose, and goals, and further the appreciation of singular historical and social phenomena—an interpretive method of finding "truth"—rather than explaining the causality of events or uncovering the truth of the natural world. Apart from its societal application, narrative imagination is an important tool in the (re)production of understood meaning in history, culture, and literature.

Imagination, as part of the toolkit of artists or scholars, helps create meaning that invokes a response from an audience. Since a humanities scholar is always within the nexus of lived experiences, no "absolute" knowledge is theoretically possible; knowledge is instead a ceaseless procedure of inventing and reinventing the context a text is read in. Poststructuralism has problematized an approach to the humanistic study based on questions of meaning, intentionality, and authorship. In the wake of the death of the author proclaimed by Roland Barthes, various theoretical currents such as deconstruction and discourse analysis seek to expose the ideologies and rhetoric operative in producing both the purportedly meaningful objects and the hermeneutic subjects of humanistic study. This exposure has opened up the interpretive structures of the humanities to criticism that humanities scholarship is "unscientific" and therefore unfit for inclusion in modern university curricula because of the very nature of its changing contextual meaning.

=== Pleasure, the pursuit of knowledge and scholarship ===
Some, like Stanley Fish, have claimed that the humanities can defend themselves best by refusing to make any claims of utility. (Fish may well be thinking primarily of literary study, rather than history and philosophy.) Any attempt to justify the humanities in terms of external benefits, such as social usefulness (say, increased productivity), or in terms of ennobling effects on the individual (such as greater wisdom or diminished prejudice) is, according to Fish, ungrounded and places impossible demands on the relevant academic departments. Furthermore, critical thinking, while arguably a result of humanistic training, can be acquired in other contexts. And the humanities do not even provide any more the kind of social cachet (what sociologists sometimes call "cultural capital") that was helpful to succeed in Western society before the age of mass education following World War II.

Instead, scholars like Fish suggest that the humanities offer a unique kind of pleasure, a pleasure based on the common pursuit of knowledge (even if it is only disciplinary knowledge). Such pleasure contrasts with the increasing privatization of leisure and the instant gratification characteristic of Western culture; it thus meets Jürgen Habermas's requirements of disregarding social status and of the rational problematization of previously unquestioned areas, which are necessary for an endeavor that takes place in the bourgeois public sphere. In this argument, then, only the academic pursuit of pleasure can provide a link between the private and the public realm in modern Western consumer society and strengthen that public sphere that, according to many theorists, is the foundation for modern democracy.

Others, like Mark Bauerlein, argue that professors in the humanities have increasingly abandoned proven methods of epistemology (I care only about the quality of your arguments, not your conclusions.) in favor of indoctrination (I care only about your conclusions, not the quality of your arguments.). The result is that professors and their students adhere rigidly to a limited set of viewpoints and have little interest in or understanding of opposing viewpoints. Once they obtain this intellectual self-satisfaction, persistent lapses in learning, research, and evaluation are common.

=== Romanticization and rejection ===
Implicit in many of these arguments supporting the humanities are the makings of arguments against public support of the humanities. Joseph Carroll asserts that we live in a changing world, a world where "cultural capital" is replaced with scientific literacy, and in which the romantic notion of a Renaissance humanities scholar is obsolete. Such arguments appeal to judgments and anxieties about the essential uselessness of the humanities, especially in an age when it is seemingly vitally important for scholars of literature, history, and the arts to engage in "collaborative work with experimental scientists or even simply to make "intelligent use of the findings from empirical science."

Despite many humanities-based arguments against the humanities, some within the exact sciences have called for their return. In 2017, Science popularizer Bill Nye retracted previous claims about the supposed 'uselessness' of philosophy. As Bill Nye states, "People allude to Socrates and Plato and Aristotle all the time, and I think many of us who make those references don't have a solid grounding," he said. "It's good to know the history of philosophy." Scholars, such as biologist Scott F. Gilbert, make the claim that it is in fact the increasing predominance, leading to exclusivity, of scientific ways of thinking that need to be tempered by historical and social context. Gilbert worries that the commercialization inherent in some ways of conceiving of science (the pursuit of funding, academic prestige, etc.) needs to be examined from the outside. Gilbert argues:

First of all, there is a very successful alternative to science as a commercialized march to 'progress.' This is the approach taken by the liberal arts college, a model that takes pride in seeing science in context and in integrating science with the humanities and social sciences.

== See also ==
- Art school
- Discourse analysis
- Outline of the humanities (humanities topics)
- Great Books
- Great Books programs in Canada
- Liberal arts
- Social sciences
- Humanities, arts, and social sciences
- Human science
- The Two Cultures
- List of academic disciplines
- Public humanities
- STEAM fields
- Tinbergen's four questions
- Environmental humanities
