= Women's Classical Caucus =

The Women's Classical Caucus, Inc. (WCC) is an affiliate of the American Philological Association, the organization for North American scholars and teachers of Greek and Latin language, literature, and culture (known as "classicists"), Greek and Roman historians, and scholars of ancient philosophy, science, material culture, papyrology, epigraphy, and other fields. The WCC also maintains liaisons with the American Institute of Archaeology and with the Lambda Classical Caucus, formerly the Lesbian and Gay Classical Caucus.

== History, Membership, Goals ==
The WCC is a not-for-profit group founded in 1972 and incorporated in 1992; membership is open to men as well as women. University professors and graduate students make up the majority of its members, but membership includes high school teachers, independent scholars, college students, and retired academics. According to its website, the group's goals are both scholarly and professional. It seeks to incorporate feminist perspectives in the study and teaching of ancient Mediterranean cultures, particularly the study of women in classical antiquity. It also strives to advance the goals of equality and diversity within the profession of Classics, to foster supportive professional relationships among classicists concerned with questions of gender, and to forge links with feminist scholars in other disciplines. The WCC also publishes Cloelia, an annual newsletter.

Its Steering Committee meets each year at the APA Annual Meeting, when the group also hosts get-togethers for graduate students and a Business Meeting open to all members.

== See also ==
- Diotíma (website)
- Janet Marion Martin
