= Thesaurus Linguae Graecae =

Digital corpus of pre-1500 Greek literature

The Thesaurus Linguae Graecae (TLG) is a research center at the University of California, Irvine. The TLG was founded in 1972 by Marianne McDonald (a graduate student at the time and now a professor of theater and classics at the University of California, San Diego) with the goal to create a comprehensive digital collection of all surviving texts written in Greek from antiquity to the present era. Since 1972, the TLG has collected and digitized most surviving literary texts written in Greek from Homer to the fall of Constantinople in 1453 CE, and beyond. Theodore Brunner (1934–2007) directed the project from 1972 until his retirement from the University of California in 1998. Maria Pantelia, also a classics professor at UC Irvine, succeeded Theodore Brunner in 1998, and has been directing the TLG since. TLG's name is shared with its online database, the full title of which is Thesaurus Linguae Graecae: A Digital Library of Greek Literature (the TLG, in italics, for short).

The challenge of this huge undertaking was originally met with the help of several classicists and technology experts but primarily thanks to the efforts of David W. Packard and his team who created the Ibycus system, the hardware and software originally used to proofread and search the corpus. Packard also developed Beta code, a character and formatting encoding convention used to encode Polytonic Greek. The collection was originally circulated on CD-ROM. The first CD-ROM was released in 1985, and was the first compact disc that did not contain music. Subsequent versions were released in 1988 and in 1992, thanks to technical support provided by Packard.

By the late 1990s, it became obvious that the old Ibycus technology was outdated. Under the direction of Professor Maria Pantelia, a number of new projects were undertaken, including the massive migration out of Ibycus, the development of a new system to digitize, proofread, and manage the textual collection, a new CD-ROM (TLG E), released in 1999, and eventually the move of the corpus to the web environment in 2001. At the same time, the TLG started working with the Unicode Technical Committee to include all characters needed to encode and display Greek in the Unicode standard. The corpus continues to be expanded significantly to include Byzantine, medieval, and eventually modern Greek texts. More recent projects include the lemmatization of the Greek corpus (2006) – a substantial undertaking, given the highly inflected nature of Greek and the complexity of the corpus, covering more than two millennia of literary development – and the Online Liddell–Scott–Jones Greek–English Lexicon (commonly referred to as the LSJ), released in February 2011.

Since 2001, the TLG corpus has been searchable online by members of subscribing institutions, which number close to 1500 worldwide. All bibliographical information and a subset of the texts are available to the general public.

The number of Greek words in the corpus amounts to 110 million, while the number of unique wordforms amount to 1.6 million and the number of unique lemmata to 250,000.

== See also ==
- Packard Humanities Institute
- Perseus Project
- Digital Classicist
- Thesaurus Linguae Latinae
