= Hellenic Organization for Standardization =

The Hellenic Organization for Standardization (Greek: Ελληνικός Οργανισμός Τυποποίησης, Ellīnikós Organismós Typopoíīsīs; abbreviated ΕΛΟΤ in Greek and ELOT in English) is the national standards organization for the Hellenic Republic (Greece). It issues Greece's conformance marks and is responsible for various Greek standards, notably ELOT 743, Greece's official format for romanization of Modern Greek.

== See also ==
- International Organization for Standardization, of which ELOT is a member
