= Beta Code =

ASCII representation format for ancient Greek

Beta Code was a method of representing, using only ASCII characters, the characters, accents, and formatting found in ancient Greek texts (and other ancient languages). Its aim was to be not merely a romanization of the Greek alphabet, but to represent faithfully a wide variety of source texts – including formatting as well as rare or idiosyncratic characters. For most applications, it has been obsoleted by Unicode.

Beta Code was developed by David W. Packard in the late 1970s and adopted by Thesaurus Linguae Graecae in 1981. It became the standard for encoding polytonic Greek and was also used by a number of other projects such as the Perseus Project, the Packard Humanities Institute, the Duke collection of Documentary Papyri, and the Greek Epigraphy Project at Cornell and Ohio State University. Beta Code can be easily converted to a variety of systems for display, most notably Unicode. Most of these projects have since converted their data to Unicode. For example, Perseus originally encoded all its Ancient Greek texts using Beta code, but now releases them as Unicode.

== Encoding ==
=== Greek alphabet ===
Standard Greek alphabet with Beta Code equivalents
Upper case	Beta Code	Character name	Lower case	Beta Code
Α	*A	Alpha	α	A
Β	*B	Beta	β	B
Γ	*G	Gamma	γ	G
Δ	*D	Delta	δ	D
Ε	*E	Epsilon	ε	E
Ϝ	*V	Digamma	ϝ	V
Ζ	*Z	Zeta	ζ	Z
Η	*H	Eta	η	H
Θ	*Q	Theta	θ	Q
Ι	*I	Iota	ι	I
Κ	*K	Kappa	κ	K
Λ	*L	Lambda	λ	L
Μ	*M	Mu	μ	M
Ν	*N	Nu	ν	N
Ξ	*C	Xi	ξ	C
Ο	*O	Omicron	ο	O
Π	*P	Pi	π	P
Ρ	*R	Rho	ρ	R
Σ	*S	Medial Sigma	σ	S, S1
Σ	*S	Final Sigma	ς	S, S2, J
Ϲ	*S3	Lunate Sigma	ϲ	S3
Τ	*T	Tau	τ	T
Υ	*U	Upsilon	υ	U
Φ	*F	Phi	φ	F
Χ	*X	Chi	χ	X
Ψ	*Y	Psi	ψ	Y
Ω	*W	Omega	ω	W

==== Notes ====
- Instead of upper-case Latin letters, lower-case Latin letters may also be used (e.g. a for α and *a for Α).
- The TLG Beta Code Manual uses upper-case ASCII letters to represent Greek letters. A variant (used by the Perseus Project) uses lower-case ASCII letters instead. In both cases, the unadorned ASCII letter represents a lower-case Greek letter, and an asterisk must be added to indicate an upper-case Greek letter.
- In general, one encoding character S for Greek sigma is sufficient; it is interpreted as a final sigma at the end of words or when followed by punctuation, and as a medial sigma in other positions. In cases where this auto-disambiguation is not correct, the specific codes S1 and S2 are available.
- Some representations use J for the final sigma and S for the medial sigma. However, J is not supported/output by many applications such as Morpheus and uni2beta.

=== Punctuation ===
Punctuation
Punctuation	Beta Code	Name
.	.	Period
,	,	Comma
·	:	Colon (Ano Stigme)
;	;	Question Mark
’	'	Apostrophe
—	_	Dash
ʹ	#	Numeral (Keraia)

The character ' is used both for encoding an apostrophe and for adding a metrical breve to a vowel. The intention is disambiguated because the apostrophe is used in Greek only for elision, which normally occurs after a consonant.

=== Accents and diacritics ===
Polytonic Greek accents and diacritics
Diacritic	Beta Code	Name	Examples	Coded as
̓	)	Smooth breathing	ἐν	E)N
̔	(	Rough breathing	ὁ, οἱ	O(, OI(
́	/	Acute accent	πρός	PRO/S
͂	=	Circumflex accent	τῶν	TW=N
̀	\	Grave accent	πρὸς	PRO\S
̈	+	Diaeresis	προϊέναι	PROI+E/NAI
ͅ	|	Iota subscript	τῷ	TW=|
̄	&	Macron	μαχαίρᾱς	MAXAI/RA&S
̆	'	Breve	μάχαιρᾰ	MA/XAIRA'

These are normally postfix operators, as in the examples above, but for capitalized words, accents come between the * and the letter. The documentation does not otherwise define a required or canonical order for accents. In some data sources, breathing is normally seen before a tonal accent, and one implementation defines a canonical order of breathing, accent, iota subscript. In some implementations, the ordering of the accents can determine the arrangement of the combining characters after conversion to Unicode. Many implementations do not implement macronization.
