= ISO 5428 =

Standard for encoding Greek characters

ISO 5428:1984, Greek alphabet coded character set for bibliographic information interchange, is an ISO standard for an 8-bit character encoding for the modern Greek language. It contains a set of 73 graphic characters and is available through UNIMARC. In practice it is now superseded by Unicode.

== Character set ==
ISO 5428
	0	1	2	3	4	5	6	7	8	9	A	B	C	D	E	F
Ax		` 0060	´ 00B4	¨ 00A8	~ 007E	᾿ 1FBF	῾ 1FFE	ͺ 037A								
Bx	« 00AB	» 00BB	” 201D	“ 201C	ʹ 0374	͵ 0375						· 00B7				; 003B
Cx		Α 0391	Β 0392		Γ 0393	Δ 0394	Ε 0395	Ϛ 03DA	Ϝ 03DC	Ζ 0396	Η 0397	Θ 0398	Ι 0399	Κ 039A	Λ 039B	Μ 039C
Dx	Ν 039D	Ξ 039E	Ο 039F	Π 03A0	Ϙ 03D8	Ρ 03A1	Σ 03A3		Τ 03A4	Υ 03A5	Φ 03A6	Χ 03A7	Ψ 03A8	Ω 03A9	Ϡ 03E0	
Ex		α 03B1	β 03B2	ϐ 03D0	γ 03B3	δ 03B4	ε 03B5	ϛ 03DB	ϝ 03DD	ζ 03B6	η 03B7	θ 03B8	ι 03B9	κ 03BA	λ 03BB	μ 03BC
Fx	ν 03BD	ο 03BF	ξ 03BE	π 03C0	ϙ 03D9	ρ 03C1	σ 03C3	ς 03C2	τ 03C4	υ 03C5	φ 03C6	χ 03C7	ψ 03C8	ω 03C9	ϡ 03E1	

== See also ==
- Greek Alphabet
- ISO/IEC 8859-7
