= Windows Polytonic Greek =

Computer encoding of the Greek alphabet

Windows Polytonic Greek is a modification of Windows-1253 that was used by Paratype to cover Polytonic Greek. This encoding is supported by FontLab Studio 5.

== Character set ==
The following table shows Windows Polytonic Greek. Each character is shown with its Unicode equivalent. Note that the older FontLab mapping swaps 0xB5 and 0xFF.

Windows Polytonic Greek
	0	1	2	3	4	5	6	7	8	9	A	B	C	D	E	F
0x	NUL	SOH	STX	ETX	EOT	ENQ	ACK	BEL	BS	HT	LF	VT	FF	CR	SO	SI
1x	DLE	DC1	DC2	DC3	DC4	NAK	SYN	ETB	CAN	EM	SUB	ESC	FS	GS	RS	US
2x	SP	!	"	#	$	%	&	'	(	)	*	+	,	-	.	/
3x	0	1	2	3	4	5	6	7	8	9	:	;	<	=	>	?
4x	¨	´	`	῀	ι	᾿	῾	῞	῝	῎	῍	῟	῏	΅	ὰ	ᾶ
5x	ἀ	ἁ	ἅ	ἃ	ἄ	ἂ	ἇ	ἆ	ᾴ	ᾲ	ᾷ	ᾀ	ᾁ	ᾅ	ᾃ	ᾄ
6x	ᾂ	ᾇ	ᾆ	ὲ	ἐ	ἑ	ἕ	ἓ	ἔ	ἒ	ἱ	ἰ	ἵ	ἳ	ἴ	ἲ
7x	ἷ	ἶ	ὶ	ῖ	ῒ	ᾳ	ῳ	ῃ	ὴ	ῆ	ἠ	ἥ	ἣ	ἤ	ἢ	ᾤ
8x	ʹ	Ϝ	ἧ	ἦ	ῄ	ῂ	ῇ	ᾐ	ᾕ	ᾓ	ᾔ	ᾒ	ᾗ	ϲ	Ϡ	Ϛ
9x	͵	ᾖ	ὸ	ὀ	ὅ	ὃ	ὄ	ὂ	ὺ	ῦ	ὐ	ὑ	ὕ	Ϟ	῭	ὓ
Ax	NBSP	ὔ	ὒ	ὗ	ὖ	ῢ	ὼ	ῶ	ὠ	ὡ	ὥ	ὣ	ὤ	ὢ	ὧ	ὦ
Bx	ῲ	ῴ	ῷ	ᾠ	ᾡ	ᾥ	¶	·	ᾢ	ᾧ	ᾦ	ῤ	ῥ	ἡ	ᾑ	ὁ
Cx	ΐ	Α	Β	Γ	Δ	Ε	Ζ	Η	Θ	Ι	Κ	Λ	Μ	Ν	Ξ	Ο
Dx	Π	Ρ	᾽	Σ	Τ	Υ	Φ	Χ	Ψ	Ω	Ϊ	Ϋ	ά	έ	ή	ί
Ex	ΰ	α	β	γ	δ	ε	ζ	η	θ	ι	κ	λ	μ	ν	ξ	ο
Fx	π	ρ	ς	σ	τ	υ	φ	χ	ψ	ω	ϊ	ϋ	ό	ύ	ώ	ᾣ
