= Greek Extended =

- Range: U+1F00..U+1FFF (256 code points)
- Plane: BMP
- Scripts: Greek
- Major alphabets: polytonic Greek
- Assigned: 233 code points
- Unused: 23 reserved code points

Unicode version history
- 1.1 (1993): 233 (+233)

Unicode documentation
- Code chart ∣ Web page

Greek Extended is a Unicode block containing the accented vowels necessary for writing polytonic Greek. The regular, unaccented Greek characters as well as the characters with tonos and diaeresis can be found in the Greek and Coptic block. Greek Extended was encoded in version 1.1 of the Unicode Standard. As an alternative to Greek Extended, combining characters can be used to represent the tones and breath marks of polytonic Greek.

In this block, the letters with oxia (acute accent) and no other accent are not used in any of the Unicode normalizations. Decomposition of U+1F71 ά GREEK SMALL LETTER ALPHA WITH OXIA, for example, yields U+03B1 α GREEK SMALL LETTER ALPHA followed by a U+0301 ◌́ COMBINING ACUTE ACCENT, while composition yields the same letter with tonos, U+03AC ά GREEK SMALL LETTER ALPHA WITH TONOS, from the Greek and Coptic block.

== Block ==
Greek Extended^{[1]}^{[2]} Official Unicode Consortium code chart (PDF)
	0	1	2	3	4	5	6	7	8	9	A	B	C	D	E	F
U+1F0x	ἀ	ἁ	ἂ	ἃ	ἄ	ἅ	ἆ	ἇ	Ἀ	Ἁ	Ἂ	Ἃ	Ἄ	Ἅ	Ἆ	Ἇ
U+1F1x	ἐ	ἑ	ἒ	ἓ	ἔ	ἕ			Ἐ	Ἑ	Ἒ	Ἓ	Ἔ	Ἕ		
U+1F2x	ἠ	ἡ	ἢ	ἣ	ἤ	ἥ	ἦ	ἧ	Ἠ	Ἡ	Ἢ	Ἣ	Ἤ	Ἥ	Ἦ	Ἧ
U+1F3x	ἰ	ἱ	ἲ	ἳ	ἴ	ἵ	ἶ	ἷ	Ἰ	Ἱ	Ἲ	Ἳ	Ἴ	Ἵ	Ἶ	Ἷ
U+1F4x	ὀ	ὁ	ὂ	ὃ	ὄ	ὅ			Ὀ	Ὁ	Ὂ	Ὃ	Ὄ	Ὅ		
U+1F5x	ὐ	ὑ	ὒ	ὓ	ὔ	ὕ	ὖ	ὗ		Ὑ		Ὓ		Ὕ		Ὗ
U+1F6x	ὠ	ὡ	ὢ	ὣ	ὤ	ὥ	ὦ	ὧ	Ὠ	Ὡ	Ὢ	Ὣ	Ὤ	Ὥ	Ὦ	Ὧ
U+1F7x	ὰ	ά	ὲ	έ	ὴ	ή	ὶ	ί	ὸ	ό	ὺ	ύ	ὼ	ώ		
U+1F8x	ᾀ	ᾁ	ᾂ	ᾃ	ᾄ	ᾅ	ᾆ	ᾇ	ᾈ	ᾉ	ᾊ	ᾋ	ᾌ	ᾍ	ᾎ	ᾏ
U+1F9x	ᾐ	ᾑ	ᾒ	ᾓ	ᾔ	ᾕ	ᾖ	ᾗ	ᾘ	ᾙ	ᾚ	ᾛ	ᾜ	ᾝ	ᾞ	ᾟ
U+1FAx	ᾠ	ᾡ	ᾢ	ᾣ	ᾤ	ᾥ	ᾦ	ᾧ	ᾨ	ᾩ	ᾪ	ᾫ	ᾬ	ᾭ	ᾮ	ᾯ
U+1FBx	ᾰ	ᾱ	ᾲ	ᾳ	ᾴ		ᾶ	ᾷ	Ᾰ	Ᾱ	Ὰ	Ά	ᾼ	᾽	ι	᾿
U+1FCx	῀	῁	ῂ	ῃ	ῄ		ῆ	ῇ	Ὲ	Έ	Ὴ	Ή	ῌ	῍	῎	῏
U+1FDx	ῐ	ῑ	ῒ	ΐ			ῖ	ῗ	Ῐ	Ῑ	Ὶ	Ί		῝	῞	῟
U+1FEx	ῠ	ῡ	ῢ	ΰ	ῤ	ῥ	ῦ	ῧ	Ῠ	Ῡ	Ὺ	Ύ	Ῥ	῭	΅	`
U+1FFx			ῲ	ῳ	ῴ		ῶ	ῷ	Ὸ	Ό	Ὼ	Ώ	ῼ	´	῾	
Notes: 1. As of Unicode version 17.0; 2. Grey areas indicate non-assigned code points

== History ==
The following Unicode-related documents record the purpose and process of defining specific characters in the Greek Extended block:

Version	Final code points (Note: Proposed code points and characters names may differ from final code points and names)	Count	UTC ID	L2 ID	WG2 ID	Document
1.1	U+1F00..1F15, 1F18..1F1D, 1F20..1F45, 1F48..1F4D, 1F50..1F57, 1F59, 1F5B, 1F5D, 1F5F..1F7D, 1F80..1FB4, 1FB6..1FC4, 1FC6..1FD3, 1FD6..1FDB, 1FDD..1FEF, 1FF2..1FF4, 1FF6..1FFE	233				(to be determined)
1.1	U+1F00..1F15, 1F18..1F1D, 1F20..1F45, 1F48..1F4D, 1F50..1F57, 1F59, 1F5B, 1F5D, 1F5F..1F7D, 1F80..1FB4, 1FB6..1FC4, 1FC6..1FD3, 1FD6..1FDB, 1FDD..1FEF, 1FF2..1FF4, 1FF6..1FFE	233		X3L2/95-090	N1253 (doc, txt)	Umamaheswaran, V. S.; Ksar, Mike (1995-09-09), "4.2", Unconfirmed Minutes of WG 2 Meeting # 28 in Helsinki, Finland; 1995-06-26--27
1.1	U+1F00..1F15, 1F18..1F1D, 1F20..1F45, 1F48..1F4D, 1F50..1F57, 1F59, 1F5B, 1F5D, 1F5F..1F7D, 1F80..1FB4, 1FB6..1FC4, 1FC6..1FD3, 1FD6..1FDB, 1FDD..1FEF, 1FF2..1FF4, 1FF6..1FFE	233	UTC/1999-017			Davis, Mark (1999-06-02), Data cross-checks (for Agenda)
1.1	U+1F00..1F15, 1F18..1F1D, 1F20..1F45, 1F48..1F4D, 1F50..1F57, 1F59, 1F5B, 1F5D, 1F5F..1F7D, 1F80..1FB4, 1FB6..1FC4, 1FC6..1FD3, 1FD6..1FDB, 1FDD..1FEF, 1FF2..1FF4, 1FF6..1FFE	233		L2/99-176R		Moore, Lisa (1999-11-04), "Data Cross-Checks", Minutes from the joint UTC/L2 meeting in Seattle, June 8-10, 1999
