= Greek phonology =

Greek phonology may refer to:

- Ancient Greek phonology, discussing the classical language
- Koine Greek phonology, discussing the developments between Classical and Modern Greek
- Modern Greek phonology, discussing the modern language
