= Greek pronunciation =

Greek pronunciation may refer to:

- Ancient Greek phonology
- Koine Greek phonology
- Modern Greek phonology
