= Iota subscript =

Diacritic mark in the Greek alphabet

Iota subscripts in the word ᾠδῇ, ōidêi ('ode', dative).

The iota subscript is a diacritic mark in the Greek alphabet shaped like a small vertical stroke or miniature iota ⟨ι⟩ placed below the letter. It occurs with the vowel letters alpha ⟨α⟩, eta ⟨η⟩ and omega ⟨ω⟩, and represents the presence of an [i̯] offglide after a long vowel, forming the so‐called "long diphthongs" ⟨ᾳ, ῃ, ῳ⟩. Such diphthongs were phonologically distinct from the "short" diphthongs ⟨ᾰι, ει, οι⟩ of ancient Greek in the pre-classical and classical eras.

The offglide was gradually lost in pronunciation, a process that started already during the classical period and continued during the Hellenistic period, with the result that, from approximately the 1st century BC onwards, the former long diphthongs were no longer distinguished in pronunciation from their corresponding long vowels ⟨ᾱ, η, ω⟩, respectively (the long monophthongs).

During the Roman and Byzantine eras, the iota in such diphthongs, by then mute, was sometimes still written as a standard letter, but was often simply omitted. The iota subscript was invented by Byzantine philologists in the 12th century AD as an editorial symbol, marking the places where such spelling variation occurred. The presence or absence of a mute iota can often help to reduce ambiguity, especially when dealing with inflectional affixes.

When the mute iota is written as a standard letter after its long vowel, as in ⟨αι, ηι, ωι⟩, it is known as an iota adscript. In some editions, these iota adscripts may be reduced in size, as in ⟨αι, ηι, ωι⟩, in order to distinguish them from regular lowercase iotas. In either case, iota adscripts do not carry diacritics, such as breathing marks or accents. In some editions, the iota adscript is used for uppercase letters and the iota subscript for lowercase letters, as in ⟨ᾼ ᾳ, ῌ ῃ, ῼ ῳ⟩.

In uppercase-only environments, it is typical for the mute iota to be given in full-size when prioritising a faithful rendition of classical texts, as in ⟨ΑΙ, ΗΙ, ΩΙ⟩, but lowercase ⟨Αι, Ηι, Ωι⟩ or reduced ⟨ΑΙ, ΗΙ, ΩΙ⟩ may also occur for the sake of linguistic clarity.

== Terminology ==
In Greek, the subscript is called ὑπογεγραμμένη (hypogegramménē), the perfect passive participle form of the verb ὑπογράφω (hypográphō), 'to write below'. Analogously, the adscript is called προσγεγραμμένη (prosgegramménē), from the verb προσγράφω (prosgráphō), 'to write next (to something); to add in writing'.

The Greek names are grammatically feminine participle forms, due to the fact that the name of the letter iota (ἰῶτα)—to which they implicitly refer—was sometimes construed as a feminine noun in medieval Greek (unlike in classical and modern Greek, which both treat it as neuter). The Greek terms, transliterated according to modern Greek as ypogegrammeni and prosgegrammeni respectively, were also chosen for use in character names in the character encoding standard Unicode.

As a phonological phenomenon, the original diphthongs denoted by ⟨ᾳ, ῃ, ῳ⟩ are traditionally called "long diphthongs", which existed in the Greek language from archaic times into the classical period. From the tail end of the classical period onwards, the iota ceased to be pronounced (as the long diphthongs monophthongized and merged with their long vowel counterparts), but it was sometimes still used in writing. In some English works, these monophthongized diphthongs are referred to as "improper diphthongs". In the medieval period, the iota subscript was innovated in order to distinguish these mute iotas from those which still affected the pronunciation, as they sometimes served as a useful way to distinguish two words that would otherwise be spelled in the same way.

== Usage ==
Archaizing spelling with adscripts instead of subscripts. In pre-classical times, ancient Greek had long-vowel diphthongs, which evolved into monophthongs, mostly during the classical period and after. They continued to be written as diphthongs until the medieval period, when the iota subscript was introduced, reflecting the change in pronunciation.

Titlecase

Uppercase

Different styles of treating mute iota with capital letters

The iota subscript occurs most frequently in certain inflectional affixes of ancient Greek, especially in the dative endings of many nominal forms (e.g. τῷ ἀνθρώπῳ, τῇ πολιτείᾳ, τῇ γλώσσῃ), as well as in certain verb forms of the subjunctive mood (e.g. λύσῃς, λύσῃ). Besides these, it also occurs in the roots of certain words and names, such as ᾠδή (ōidḗ) 'ode' and its derivatives (e.g. ᾠδεῖον (ōideîon) 'odeon', τραγῳδία (tragōidía) 'tragedy', κωμῳδία (kōmōidía) 'comedy', etc.), as well as ᾍδης (Hā́idēs) 'Hades', Τρῳός (Trōiós) 'Troy', Θρᾴκη (Thrā́ikē) 'Thrace', and so on.

In modern publications of ancient Greek texts, the mute iotas of long diphthongs are considered obligatory. There is some variation in how they are represented, but the iota subscript is typically used. In some editions of classical or (especially) pre-classical texts—such as Homer—the original pronunciation of long diphthongs is emphasized by the use of the iota adscript, with accents and breathing marks placed on the first vowel, as in ⟨ἄι, ἤι, ὤι⟩ for ⟨ᾄ, ᾔ, ᾤ⟩. The iota adscript is also widespread in works that aim to faithfully reproduce texts as they were originally written, such as those dealing with epigraphy, paleography or other philological disciplines, since the iota subscript is entirely absent from pre-medieval sources.

Different conventions exist for the treatment of mute iota with uppercase letters. In Western printing, the most common practice is to use subscript diacritics only in lowercase environments, as in ⟨ᾠδεῖον⟩, and to use an adscript instead whenever the host letter is capitalized, as in ⟨Ὠιδεῖον⟩. When this happens in a mixed-case spelling environment (i.e. when only the first letter of the word is capitalized, as in proper names and at the beginning of a sentence), then the iota adscript regularly takes the shape of the normal lowercase iota letter, as in ⟨ᾠδεῖον⟩ → ⟨Ὠιδεῖον⟩. In an all-capitals environment, the adscript is also regularly capitalized ⟨ΩΙΔΕΙΟΝ⟩. In Greece, a more common convention is to print the iota subscript with lowercase and uppercase letters alike. Yet another convention is to use lowercase iota adscripts both for mixed-case and for all-capitals words, as in ⟨ΩιΔΕΙΟΝ⟩, or to use a special glyph in the shape of a smaller capital iota in the latter case, as in ⟨ΩΙΔΕΙΟΝ⟩.

In the standard monotonic orthography of modern Greek, iota subscript is not used. It had been generally retained in Katharevousa, the conservative, polytonic literary standard of Greece from the 18th to the 20th centuries, and it was also commonly used in Demotic (what is now standard Greek) publications from the 19th century onwards, but this ceased to be the case from 1982, when Demotic became the official literary standard. Even when standard Greek is spelled in the traditional polytonic system, there are few places where an iota subscript could occur, because most of its typical grammatical environments no longer occur: the dative case is not used in modern Greek (other than in a few fossilized phrases, such as ἐν τῷ μεταξύ 'in the meantime' and δόξα τῷ θεῷ 'thank God!'), and the old spellings with ⟨-ῃς, ῃ⟩ in the subjunctive forms of verbs have been analogically replaced by those of the indicative, ⟨-εις, -ει⟩, as in ⟨θα γράψῃς⟩ → ⟨θα γράψεις⟩.

=== Use with upsilon ===
Generally, iota subscript does not occur with upsilon ⟨υ⟩, despite the fact that ⟨υι⟩ was pronounced as monophthongised [yː]—the same as ⟨ῡ⟩—in all cases, even in the classical period. The works of Eustathius of Thessalonica provide a rare instance in the word ⟨ὑπόγυͅον⟩ (hypógūion, 'nigh at hand'), but it never became the convention; the same word is spelled by other writers as ⟨ὑπόγυιον⟩ (hypóguion) or ⟨ὑπόγυον⟩ (hypógūon).

== Transliteration ==
In transliteration of Greek into the Latin alphabet, the iota subscript is often omitted. The Chicago Manual of Style, however, recommends the iota subscript be "transliterated by an i on the line, following the vowel it is associated with (ἀνθρώπῳ, anthrōpōi)." (11.110 in the 17th edition, 11.131 in the 16th, 10.131 in the 15th.)

== Computer encoding ==
In the Unicode standard, iota subscript is represented by a non-spacing combining diacritic character U+0345 "Combining Greek Ypogegrammeni". There is also a spacing clone (U+037A, ͺ), as well as 36 precomposed characters, representing each of the usual combinations of iota subscript with lowercase α, η and ω, with and without various combinations of accent and breathing diacritics. In addition, for capitalized ("titlecase") use, Unicode provides a corresponding set of 27 precomposed code points with prosgegrammeni (ᾳ → ᾼ). Despite the name prosgegrammeni, which implies the use of an adscript glyph, these code points are defined as being equivalent to a combination of the base letter and the combining subscript character U+0345, in the same fashion as their lowercase equivalents. They may be variously realized with either a subscript diacritic or a full-sized iota adscript glyph, depending on the font design. For use in all-capitals ("uppercase"), Unicode additionally stipulates a special case-mapping rule according to which lowercase letters should be mapped to combinations of the uppercase letter and uppercase iota (ᾳ → ΑΙ).

In the ASCII-based encoding standard Beta Code, the iota subscript is represented by the pipe character ⟨|⟩, as in ⟨A|⟩ for ⟨ᾳ⟩.

== See also ==
- Greek diacritics
- Hypodiastole
