= Alpha =

First letter of the Greek alphabet

Alpha /ˈælfə/ ALF-ə (uppercase Α, lowercase α) (Note: Ancient Greek: ἄλφα, romanized: álpha, or Greek: άλφα, romanized: álfa) is the first letter of the Greek alphabet. In the system of Greek numerals, it has a value of one. Alpha is derived from the Phoenician letter aleph ⟨𐤀⟩, whose name comes from the West Semitic word for 'ox'. Letters that arose from alpha include the Latin letter ⟨A⟩ and the Cyrillic letter ⟨А⟩.

== Uses ==
=== Greek ===
In Ancient Greek, alpha was pronounced [a] and could be either phonemically long ([aː]) or short ([a]). Where there is ambiguity, long and short alpha are sometimes written with a macron and breve today: Ᾱᾱ, Ᾰᾰ.

- ὥρα = ὥρᾱ hōrā Greek pronunciation: [hɔ́ːraː] "a time"
- γλῶσσα = γλῶσσᾰ glôssa Greek pronunciation: [ɡlɔ̂ːssa] "tongue"

In Modern Greek, vowel length has been lost, and all instances of alpha simply represent the open front unrounded vowel IPA: [a].

In the polytonic orthography of Greek, alpha, like other vowel letters, can occur with several diacritic marks: any of three accent symbols (ά, ὰ, ᾶ), and either of two breathing marks (ἁ, ἀ), as well as combinations of these. It can also combine with the iota subscript (ᾳ).

==== Greek grammar ====
In the Attic–Ionic dialect of Ancient Greek, long alpha [aː] fronted to [ɛː] (eta). In Ionic, the shift took place in all positions. In Attic, the shift did not take place after epsilon, iota, and rho (ε, ι, ρ; e, i, r). In Doric and Aeolic, long alpha is preserved in all positions.

- Doric, Aeolic, Attic χώρᾱ chṓrā – Ionic χώρη chṓrē, "country"
- Doric, Aeolic φᾱ́μᾱ phā́mā – Attic, Ionic φήμη phḗmē, "report"

Privative a is the Ancient Greek prefix ἀ- or ἀν- a-, an-, added to words to negate them. It originates from the Proto-Indo-European *n̥- (syllabic nasal) and is cognate with English un-.

Copulative a is the Greek prefix ἁ- or ἀ- ha-, a-. It comes from Proto-Indo-European *sm̥.

=== Mathematics and science ===
The letter alpha represents various concepts in physics and chemistry, including alpha radiation, angular acceleration, alpha particles, alpha carbon and strength of electromagnetic interaction (as fine-structure constant). Alpha also stands for thermal expansion coefficient of a compound in physical chemistry. In ethology, it is used to name the dominant individual in a group of animals. In aerodynamics, the letter is used as a symbol for the angle of attack of an aircraft and the word "alpha" is used as a synonym for this property.

In astronomy, α is often used to designate the brightest star in a constellation.

In mathematics, the letter alpha is used to denote the area underneath a normal curve in statistics to denote significance level when proving null and alternative hypotheses. It is also commonly used in algebraic solutions representing quantities such as angles. In mathematical logic, α is sometimes used as a placeholder for ordinal numbers. It is used for Stoneham numbers.

Most occurrences of alpha in science are the lowercase alpha. The uppercase letter alpha is not generally used as a symbol because it tends to be rendered identically to the uppercase Latin A.

The proportionality operator "∝" (in Unicode: U+221D) is sometimes mistaken for alpha.

=== International Phonetic Alphabet ===
In the International Phonetic Alphabet, the letter ɑ, which looks similar to the lower-case alpha, represents the open back unrounded vowel.

== History and symbolism ==
=== Origin ===
The Phoenician alphabet was adopted for Greek in the early 8th century BC, perhaps in Euboea. The majority of the letters of the Phoenician alphabet were adopted into Greek with much the same sounds as they had had in Phoenician, but ʼāleph, the Phoenician letter representing the glottal stop [ʔ], was adopted as representing the vowel [a]; similarly, hē [h] and ʽayin [ʕ] are Phoenician consonants that became Greek vowels, epsilon [e] and omicron [o], respectively.

=== Alpha and Omega ===
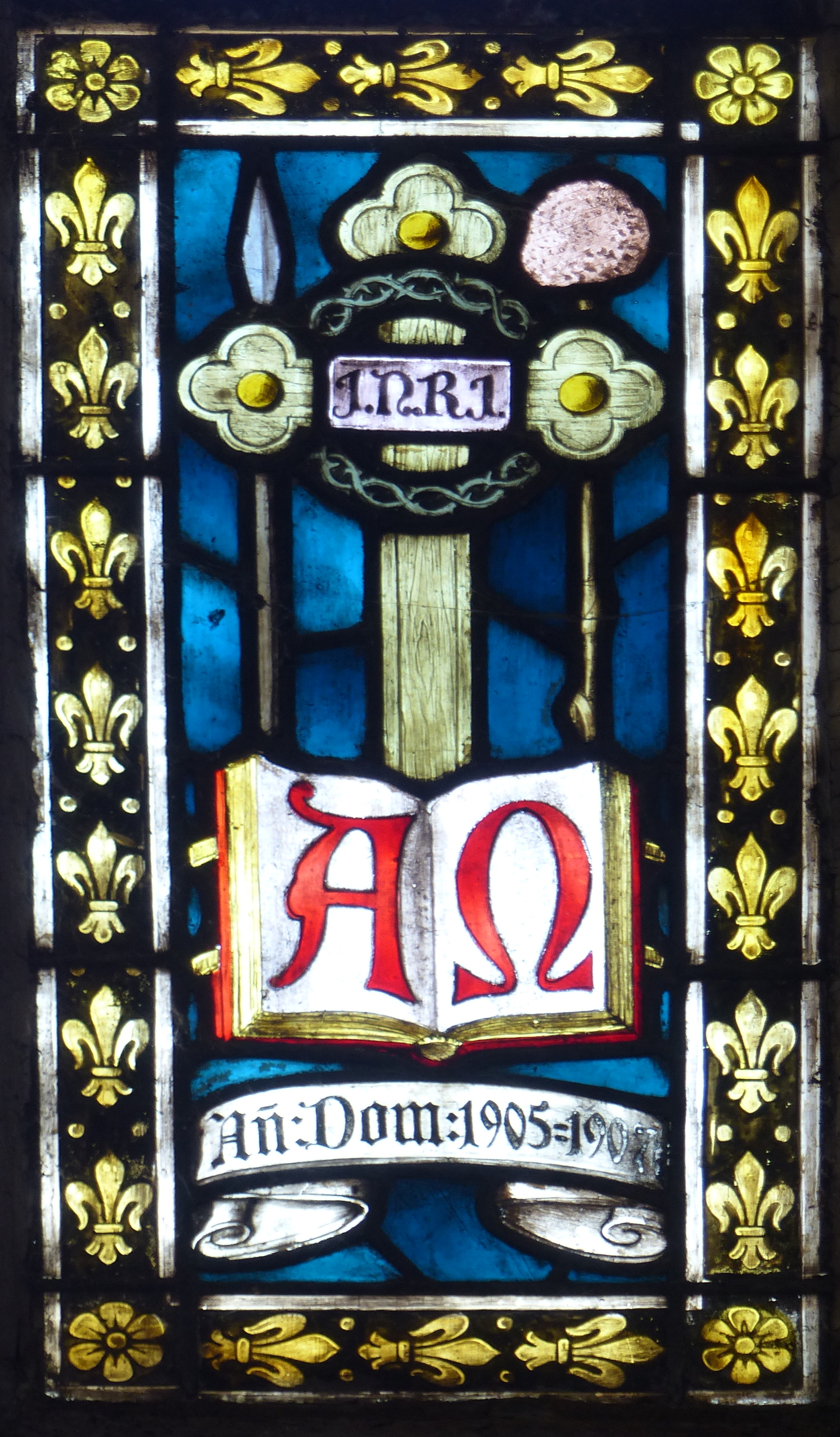
Stained glass featuring Alpha and Omega in the Königsberg in Bayern Marienkirche

As the first letter of the alphabet, Alpha as a Greek numeral came to represent the number 1. Therefore, Alpha, both as a symbol and term, is used to refer to the "first", or "primary", or "principal" (most significant) occurrence or status of a thing.

The New Testament has God declaring himself to be the "Alpha and Omega, the beginning and the end, the first and the last." (Revelation 22:13, KJV, and see also 1:8).

Consequently, the term "alpha" has also come to be used to denote "primary" position in social hierarchy, examples being the concept of dominant "alpha" members in groups of animals.

== Unicode ==
All code points with ALPHA or ALFA but without WITH (for accented Greek characters, see Greek diacritics: Computer encoding):

- U+0251 ɑ LATIN SMALL LETTER ALPHA
- U+0252 ɒ LATIN SMALL LETTER TURNED ALPHA
- U+0386 Ά GREEK CAPITAL LETTER ALPHA WITH TONOS
- U+0391 Α GREEK CAPITAL LETTER ALPHA (&Alpha;)
- U+03AC ά GREEK SMALL LETTER ALPHA WITH TONOS
- U+03B1 α GREEK SMALL LETTER ALPHA (&alpha;)
- U+1D45 ᵅ MODIFIER LETTER SMALL ALPHA
- U+1D90 ᶐ LATIN SMALL LETTER ALPHA WITH RETROFLEX HOOK
- U+1D9B ᶛ MODIFIER LETTER SMALL TURNED ALPHA
- U+1DE7 ◌ᷧ COMBINING LATIN SMALL LETTER ALPHA
- U+2376 ⍶ APL FUNCTIONAL SYMBOL ALPHA UNDERBAR
- U+237A ⍺ APL FUNCTIONAL SYMBOL ALPHA
- U+2C6D Ɑ LATIN CAPITAL LETTER ALPHA
- U+2C70 Ɒ LATIN CAPITAL LETTER TURNED ALPHA
- U+2C80 Ⲁ COPTIC CAPITAL LETTER ALFA
- U+2C81 ⲁ COPTIC SMALL LETTER ALFA
- U+AB30 ꬰ LATIN SMALL LETTER BARRED ALPHA
- U+AB64 ꭤ LATIN SMALL LETTER INVERTED ALPHA
- U+1D6A8 𝚨 MATHEMATICAL BOLD CAPITAL ALPHA (Note: The mathematical symbols are only to be used in math. Stylized Greek text should be encoded using normal Greek letters, with markup and formatting to indicate text style.)
- U+1D6C2 𝛂 MATHEMATICAL BOLD SMALL ALPHA
- U+1D6E2 𝛢 MATHEMATICAL ITALIC CAPITAL ALPHA
- U+1D6FC 𝛼 MATHEMATICAL ITALIC SMALL ALPHA
- U+1D71C 𝜜 MATHEMATICAL BOLD ITALIC CAPITAL ALPHA
- U+1D736 𝜶 MATHEMATICAL BOLD ITALIC SMALL ALPHA
- U+1D756 𝝖 MATHEMATICAL SANS-SERIF BOLD CAPITAL ALPHA
- U+1D770 𝝰 MATHEMATICAL SANS-SERIF BOLD SMALL ALPHA
- U+1D790 𝞐 MATHEMATICAL SANS-SERIF BOLD ITALIC CAPITAL ALPHA
- U+1D7AA 𝞪 MATHEMATICAL SANS-SERIF BOLD ITALIC SMALL ALPHA
