= Rough breathing =

Diacritical mark used in polytonic orthography

◌̔o

Rough breathing
- U+0314 ̔ COMBINING REVERSED COMMA ABOVE

See also
- Smooth breathing

In the polytonic orthography of Ancient Greek, the rough breathing (Ancient Greek: δασὺ πνεῦμα, romanized: dasỳ pneûma or δασεῖα daseîa; Latin: spiritus asper) character is a diacritical mark used to indicate the presence of an /h/ sound before a vowel, diphthong, or after rho. It remained in the polytonic orthography even after the Hellenistic period, when the sound disappeared from the Greek language. In the monotonic orthography of Modern Greek phonology, in use since 1982, it is not used at all.

The absence of an /h/ sound is marked by the smooth breathing.

The character, or those with similar shape such as U+02BB ʻ MODIFIER LETTER TURNED COMMA, have also been used for a similar sound by Thomas Wade (and others) in the Wade–Giles system of romanization for Mandarin Chinese. Herbert Giles and others have used a left (opening) curved single quotation mark for the same purpose; the apostrophe, backtick, and visually similar characters are often seen as well.

== History ==
Tack-shaped archaic consonantal Heta, together with a lowercase variant designed for modern typography

The rough breathing character derives from the left-hand half of the Greek letter Η (eta). In some archaic Greek alphabets, the letter was used for [h] (Heta), and this usage survives in the Latin letter H. In other dialects, it was used for the vowel [ɛː] (Eta), and this usage survives in the modern system of writing Ancient Greek, and in Modern Greek.

== Usage ==
The rough breathing ( ̔) is placed over an initial vowel, or over the second vowel of an initial diphthong.

- αἵρεσις haíresis 'choice' (→ Latin haeresis → English heresy)
- ἥρως hḗrōs 'hero'

An upsilon or rho at the beginning of a word always takes a rough breathing.

- ὕμνος hýmnos 'hymn'
- ῥυθμός rhythmós 'rhythm'

=== Inside a word ===
In some writing conventions, the rough breathing is written on the second of two rhos in the middle of a word. This is transliterated as rrh in Latin.

- διάῤῥοια diárrhoia 'diarrhoea'

In crasis (contraction of two words), when the second word has a rough breathing, the contracted vowel does not take a rough breathing. Instead, the consonant before the contracted vowel changes to the aspirated equivalent (i.e., π → φ, τ → θ, κ → χ), if possible, and the contracted vowel takes the apostrophe or coronis (indicating smooth breathing).

- τὸ ἕτερον → θοὔτερον (not *τοὕτερον) 'the other one'
  tò héteron → thoúteron

Under the archaizing influence of Katharevousa, this change has been preserved in modern Greek neologisms coined on the basis of ancient words, e.g. πρωθυπουργός ('prime minister'), from πρῶτος ('first') and ὑπουργός ('minister'), where the latter was originally aspirated.

In the ancient Laconian dialect, medial intervocalic σ would become a rough breathing: ἐνῑ́κᾱἑ for Attic ἐνῑ́κησε.

== Typography ==
In Unicode, the code point assigned to the rough breathing mark is U+0314 ◌̔ COMBINING REVERSED COMMA ABOVE. It is intended to be used in all alphabetic scripts (including Greek and Latin).

It was also used in the original Latin transcription of Armenian, for example with U+0074 t LATIN SMALL LETTER T in t̔.

The pair of space + combining reversed comma is equivalent to U+02BD ʽ MODIFIER LETTER REVERSED COMMA. It may bind typographically with the letter encoded before it to its left to create ligatures, for example with U+0074 t LATIN SMALL LETTER T in tʽ, and it is used for the modern Latin transcription of Armenian (which no longer uses the combining version).

The rough breathing mark is also encoded for compatibility as U+1FFE ῾ GREEK DASIA, mostly for usage in the Greek script, where it may be used before capital letters to its right and aligned differently, e.g. U+1FFE + U+03A9 Ω GREEK CAPITAL LETTER OMEGA: ῾Ω. In contrast, the space + combining dasia should be used after the letter it modifies to its left (the space is inserted so that the dasia will be to the left instead of above that letter). Basically, U+1FFE was encoded for full roundtrip compatibility with legacy eight-bit encodings of the Greek script in documents where dasia was used before the capital letter it modifies (it is then not appropriate for transliterating Armenian and Semitic scripts to the Latin script).

There is a polytonic Greek code range in Unicode, covering precomposed versions (i.e. breathing mark + vowel or rho, or vowel with pitch accent, iota subscript, or both): Ἁ ἁ, Ἇ ἇ, ᾏ ᾇ, ᾉ ᾁ, Ἑ ἑ, Ἡ ἡ, Ἧ ἧ, ᾟ ᾗ, ᾙ ᾑ, Ἱ ἱ, Ἷ ἷ, Ὁ ὁ, Ῥ ῥ, Ὑ ὑ, Ὗ ὗ, Ὡ ὡ, Ὧ ὧ, ᾯ ᾧ, and ᾩ ᾡ.

The rough breathing mark was also used in the early Cyrillic alphabet when writing the Old Church Slavonic language. In this context it is encoded as Unicode U+0485 ◌҅ COMBINING CYRILLIC DASIA PNEUMATA.

In Latin transcription of Semitic languages, especially Arabic and Hebrew, either U+02BD ʽ MODIFIER LETTER REVERSED COMMA or the similar U+02BF ʿ MODIFIER LETTER LEFT HALF RING is used to represent the letter ayin. This left half ring may also be used for the Latin transcription of Armenian (though the Armenian aspiration is phonetically nearer to the Greek dasia than the Semitic ayin).

== See also ==
- Greek diacritics
  - Smooth breathing
- Ayin ( ʿ )
- ʻOkina ( ʻ )
