= Smooth breathing =

Diacritical mark used in polytonic orthography

◌̓o

Smooth breathing
- U+0313 ◌̓ COMBINING COMMA ABOVE

See also
- Rough breathing

The smooth breathing (Greek: ψιλή psilí) (Note: Ancient Greek: ψιλὸν πνεῦμα, romanized: psilòn pneûma; Latin: spiritus lenis) is a diacritical mark used in the polytonic orthography of Greek. In Ancient Greek, it marks the absence of the voiceless glottal fricative /h/ from the beginning of a word.

Some authorities have interpreted it as representing a glottal stop, but a final vowel at the end of a word is regularly elided (removed) when the following word starts with a vowel and elision would not happen if the second word began with a glottal stop (or any other form of stop consonant). In his Vox Graeca, W. Sidney Allen accordingly regards the glottal stop interpretation as "highly improbable".

The smooth breathing mark ( ᾿ ) is written as on top of one initial vowel, on top of the second vowel of a diphthong or to the left of a capital and also, in certain editions, on the first of a pair of rhos. It did not occur on an initial upsilon, which always has rough breathing (thus the early name ὕ hy, rather than ὔ y) except in certain pre-Koine dialects which had lost aspiration much earlier.

The smooth breathing was kept in the traditional polytonic orthography even after the /h/ sound had disappeared from the language in Hellenistic times. It has been dropped in the modern monotonic orthography.

== History ==
The origin of the sign is thought to be the right-hand half ( ┤ ) of the letter H, which was used in some archaic Greek alphabets as [h] while in others it was used for the vowel eta. It was developed by Aristophanes of Byzantium to help readers discern between similar words. For example, ὅρος horos 'boundary' (rough breathing) and ὄρος oros 'mountain' (smooth breathing). In medieval and modern script, it takes the form of a closing half moon (reverse C) or a closing single quotation mark:

- ἀ
- Ἀ

Smooth breathings were also used in the early Cyrillic and Glagolitic alphabets when writing the Old Church Slavonic language. Today it is used in Church Slavonic according to a simple rule: if a word starts with a vowel, the vowel has a psili over it. From the Russian writing system, it was eliminated by Peter the Great during his alphabet and font-style reform (1707). All other Cyrillic-based modern writing systems are based on the Petrine script, so they have never had the smooth breathing.

== Coronis ==
The coronis (κορωνίς, korōnís, "crow's beak" or "bent mark"), the symbol written over a vowel contracted by crasis, (Note: Note on terminology: Crasis in English usually refers to merging of words, but the sense of the word in the original Greek used to be more general, referring to most changes related to vowel contraction, including synaeresis, though this is no longer the case.) was originally an apostrophe after the letter: τα᾽μά. In present use, its appearances in Ancient Greek are written over the medial vowel with the smooth breathing mark—τἀμά—and appearances of crasis in modern Greek are not marked.

== Letters with smooth breathing mark ==
- Smooth breathing ◌̓
  Greek: Ἀ ἀ
- Ἐ ἐ
- Ἠ ἠ
- Ἰ ἰ
- Ὀ ὀ
- ῤ
- ὐ
- Ὠ ὠ

== Unicode ==
In Unicode, the code points assigned to the smooth breathing are U+0313 ◌̓ COMBINING COMMA ABOVE for Greek and U+0486 ◌҆ COMBINING CYRILLIC PSILI PNEUMATA for Cyrillic. The pair of space + spiritus lenis is U+1FBF ᾿ GREEK PSILI. The coronis is assigned two distinct code points, U+1FBD ᾽ GREEK KORONIS and U+0343 ◌̓ COMBINING GREEK KORONIS.

== See also ==
- Greek diacritics
  - Rough breathing
- Modifier letter right half ring (ʾ)
  - Aleph
