= Iota =

Ninth letter in the Greek alphabet

Iota (English: /aɪˈoʊtə/ or /ɪˈoʊtə/;, Greek: ιώτα) /ˈjota/), uppercase Ι, lowercase ι, is the ninth letter of the Greek alphabet. It was derived from the Phoenician letter Yodh. Letters that arose from this letter include the Latin I and J, the Cyrillic І (І, і), Yi (Ї, ї), and Je (Ј, ј), and iotated letters (e.g. Yu (Ю, ю)). In the system of Greek numerals, iota has a value of 10.

Iota represents the close front unrounded vowel IPA: [i]. In early forms of ancient Greek, it occurred in both long [iː] and short [i] versions, but this distinction was lost in late Koine Greek. Iota participated as the second element in falling diphthongs, with both long and short vowels as the first element. Where the first element was long, the iota was lost in pronunciation at an early date, and was written in polytonic orthography as iota subscript, in other words as a very small ι under the main vowel. Examples include ᾼ ᾳ ῌ ῃ ῼ ῳ. The former diphthongs became digraphs for simple vowels in Koine Greek.

The word is used in a common English phrase, "not one iota", meaning "not the slightest amount". This refers to iota, the smallest letter, or possibly yodh, י, the smallest letter in the Hebrew alphabet. The English word jot derives from iota. The German, Polish, Portuguese, and Spanish name for the letter J (Jot / jota) is derived from iota.

== Uses ==
- In some programming languages (e.g., A+, APL, C++, Go), iota (either as the lowercase symbol ⍳ or the identifier iota) is used to represent and generate an array of consecutive integers. For example, in APL ⍳4 gives 1 2 3 4.
- The lowercase iota symbol is sometimes used to write the imaginary unit, but more often Roman i or j is used.
- In mathematics, the inclusion map of one space into another is sometimes denoted by the lowercase iota.
- In logic, the lowercase iota denotes the definite descriptor.
- Turned iota ⟨℩⟩ was formerly used for the Sinological phonetic notation letter now transcribed as ⟨ɿ⟩.

== Unicode ==
For accented Greek characters, see Greek diacritics: Computer encoding.

- U+0196 Ɩ LATIN CAPITAL LETTER IOTA
- U+0269 ɩ LATIN SMALL LETTER IOTA
- U+0345 ͅ COMBINING GREEK YPOGEGRAMMENI
- U+037A ͺ GREEK YPOGEGRAMMENI
- U+038A Ί GREEK CAPITAL LETTER IOTA WITH TONOS
- U+0390 ΐ GREEK SMALL LETTER IOTA WITH DIALYTIKA AND TONOS
- U+0399 Ι GREEK CAPITAL LETTER IOTA (&Iota;)
- U+03AA Ϊ GREEK CAPITAL LETTER IOTA WITH DIALYTIKA
- U+03AF ί GREEK SMALL LETTER IOTA WITH TONOS
- U+03B9 ι GREEK SMALL LETTER IOTA (&iota;) (\iota in TeX)
- U+03CA ϊ GREEK SMALL LETTER IOTA WITH DIALYTIKA
- U+1D7C ᵼ LATIN SMALL LETTER IOTA WITH STROKE
- U+1DA5 ᶥ MODIFIER LETTER SMALL IOTA
- U+1FBE ι GREEK PROSGEGRAMMENI
- U+2129 ℩ TURNED GREEK SMALL LETTER IOTA (&iiota;)
- U+2373 ⍳ APL FUNCTIONAL SYMBOL IOTA
- U+2378 ⍸ APL FUNCTIONAL SYMBOL IOTA UNDERBAR
- U+2C92 Ⲓ COPTIC CAPITAL LETTER IAUDA
- U+2C93 ⲓ COPTIC SMALL LETTER IAUDA
- U+A646 Ꙇ CYRILLIC CAPITAL LETTER IOTA
- U+A647 ꙇ CYRILLIC SMALL LETTER IOTA
- U+1D6B0 𝚰 MATHEMATICAL BOLD CAPITAL IOTA (Note: The mathematical symbols are only for use in math. Stylized Greek text should be encoded using the normal Greek letters, with markup and formatting to indicate text style.)
- U+1D6CA 𝛊 MATHEMATICAL BOLD SMALL IOTA
- U+1D6EA 𝛪 MATHEMATICAL ITALIC CAPITAL IOTA
- U+1D704 𝜄 MATHEMATICAL ITALIC SMALL IOTA
- U+1D724 𝜤 MATHEMATICAL BOLD ITALIC CAPITAL IOTA
- U+1D73E 𝜾 MATHEMATICAL BOLD ITALIC SMALL IOTA
- U+1D75E 𝝞 MATHEMATICAL SANS-SERIF BOLD CAPITAL IOTA
- U+1D778 𝝸 MATHEMATICAL SANS-SERIF BOLD SMALL IOTA
- U+1D798 𝞘 MATHEMATICAL SANS-SERIF BOLD ITALIC CAPITAL IOTA
- U+1D7B2 𝞲 MATHEMATICAL SANS-SERIF BOLD ITALIC SMALL IOTA

== See also ==
- Hurricane Iota
