= Koine Greek phonology =

The Greek language underwent pronunciation changes during the Koine Greek period, from about 300 BC to 400 AD. At the beginning of the period, the pronunciation was close to Classical Greek, but at the end of the period, it was almost identical to Modern Greek.

Vowel length distinctions are important for classical poetry and drama but become less important for prose into the Patristic Age.

== Overview ==
The most significant changes during the Koine Greek period concerned vowels: the loss of vowel length distinction, the shift of the Ancient Greek system of pitch accent to a stress accent system, and the monophthongization of diphthongs (except αυ and ευ). Those changes seem widely attested from the 2nd century BC in Egyptian Greek and in the early 2nd century AD in learned Attic inscriptions. It is therefore likely that they were already common in the 2nd century BC and generalized no later than the 2nd century AD.

Another change was the frication of the second element of diphthongs αυ and ευ. This change likely took place after the occurrence of the vocalic changes described above. It is attested in Egyptian Greek starting from the 1st century AD and seems to have been generalized in the late Roman period.

Another series of changes was the frication of voiced stops, which is widely attested in Egyptian Greek starting from the 1st century AD but may have been generalized at a later date, possibly in the late Roman or early Byzantine period.

Yet another series of changes was the frication of aspirated voiceless stops, which is attested in several locations from the 1st century AD, but seems to have been generalized at a later date, possibly in the late Roman or early Byzantine period.

A last change (possibly related to frication of aspirated stops) is the loss of /h/, which may have begun as soon as the late 1st century BC in Egyptian Greek, seems to have taken place no earlier than the 2nd century AD in learned Attic inscriptions, and had most probably been generalized by the late Roman times.

== Controversies about reconstructions ==
The primary point of contention comes from the diversity of the Greek-speaking world: evidence suggests that phonological changes occurred at different times according to location or speaker background. It appears that many phonetic changes associated with the Koine period had already occurred in some varieties of Greek during the Classical period.

An opposition between learned language and vulgar language has been claimed for the corpus of Attic inscriptions. Some phonetic changes are attested in vulgar inscriptions since the end of the Classical period; still, they are not generalized until the start of the 2nd century AD in learned inscriptions. While orthographic conservatism in learned inscriptions may account for yjat, contemporary transcriptions from Greek into Latin might support the idea that it is not just orthographic conservatism but that learned speakers of Greek retained a conservative phonological system into the Roman period. On the other hand, Latin transcriptions, too, may exhibit orthographic conservatism.

Interpretation is more complex when different dating is found for similar phonetic changes in Egyptian papyri and learned Attic inscriptions. A first explanation would be dialectal differences (influence of foreign phonological systems through non-native speakers); changes would then have happened in Egyptian Greek before they were generalized in Attic. A second explanation would be that learned Attic inscriptions reflect a more learned variety of Greek than Egyptian papyri; learned speech would then have resisted changes that had been generalized in vulgar speech. A final explanation would be that the orthography in learned Attic inscriptions was artificially conservative; changes may then have been generalized no later than they are attested in Egyptian papyri. All of those explanations are plausible to some degree but would lead to different dating for the generalization of the same changes.

To sum up, there is some measure of uncertainty in dating of phonetic changes; indeed, the exact dating and the rapidity of the generalization of Koine Greek phonological changes are still matters of discussion among researchers. Orthographic variants in contemporary written sources is the most direct evidence but are not enough to date a change in every context. The testimony of grammarians and, to a lesser extent, transcriptions into foreign language are interesting because they can indicate the pronunciation that was regarded as standard by learned speakers; however, it has been argued that transcriptions may in some cases be conventional, rather than phonetic, and Greek grammarians appear to describe learned pronunciation and to ignore established vulgar pronunciation.

== Sample reconstructed phonological systems ==
=== Boeotian, 4th century BC ===
Although it belongs to the late classical period, rather than the Koine Greek period, Boeotian phonology is shown here as it prefigures several traits of later Koine phonology.

By the 4th century BC, Boeotian had monophthongized most diphthongs and featured a fricative γ. In contrast with Ionic-Attic and Koine, υ had remained a back vowel in Boeotian (written ου). Long and short vowels were still distinguished.

Teodorsson argues that by 350 BC, the majority Attic dialect seemed to display similar values (except for υ, which was a front vowel; his reconstruction has vowel length distinctions to be neutralized and υ and η to be merged with /i/, like in Modern Greek), but W. Sidney Allen does not consider his conclusions to be reliable and suspects them to be an overinterpretation of the evidence.

Early monophthongization and perhaps even vowel weakening from the shift to a stress accent are also attested in Thessalian of the 3rd century BC, which suggests that several minority dialects had acquired an advanced vowel system by the early Hellenistic period.

==== Short vowels ====
	Front	Back
	unrounded	rounded
Close	/i/ ῐ	/u/ ῠ
Mid	/e̞/ ε	/o̞/ ο
Open	/a/ ᾰ	

==== Long vowels ====
	Front		Back
	unrounded	rounded	rounded
Close	/iː/ ῑ, ει		/uː/ ῡ, ου, υι
Close-mid	/eː/ η, ῃ, (οι)	/øː/(?) οι	
Mid			/o̞ː/ ω, ῳ
Open-mid	/ɛː/ αι		
Open	/aː/ ᾱ, ᾳ		

The /yː/ value for οι is attested later, in the 3rd century BC. An intermediate value of /øː/ has been suggested by some, which is perhaps attested in spellings of ει for οι, which would indicate a premature loss of lip-rounding that would lead to /eː/, rather than /iː/ (cf. text below).

==== Diphthongs ====
/au/(?) αυ	/eu/(?) ευ

The diphthongs αυ and ευ likely retained their classical pronunciation. A single interchange with -β, indicating an early change to /av, ev/, is found later, in the 3rd century BC.

==== Stop and former stop consonants ====
	Bilabial	Dental	Velar
voiceless	/p/ π	/t/ τ	/k/ κ
voiced	/b/(?) β	/d/(?) δ	/ɣ/ γ
aspirated voiceless	/pʰ/(?) φ	/tʰ/(?) θ	/kʰ/(?) χ

Fricative values for β, δ, φ, θ and χ are likely but are unattested in Boeotian in the 4th century BC. A fricative value for θ is attested in Laconian in the late 5th century BC from spellings with σ, including in some plays by Aristophanes. δ also appears to have become a fricative in 6th-century BC Elean (see discussion on consonants below). Additionally, as noted above, a single example of ευ for εβ is found a century later.

==== Other consonants ====
Nasals	/m/ μ	/n/ ν (~ [ŋ]) γ
Liquids	/l/ λ	/r/ (~ [r̥] ?) ρ (ῥ)
Sibilant	/s/ σ	/z/ ζ, σ
Aspirate(?)	/h/(?) ῾	

No reference has been found on the status of the aspirate in Boeotian during this period.

==== Accentuation ====
The tonal accent system of Ancient Greek probably remained relevant.

==== Sample phonetic transcription ====
The following text, a Hellenistic Boeotian inscription, is rendered in a reconstructed pronunciation that reflects regional phonological developments. Monophthongization and vowel raising are clearly seen in the specialized Boeotian orthography, which uses η for αι, ει for η and ηι (ῃ) and ω for ωι (ῳ). There is also a spelling of ει for οι, indicating an early loss of lip-rounding resulting in /eː/, not /i(ː)/, which allows the inference that at this stage, οι became /øː/, not /y/. It is possible that in vulgar Attic, the /y/ > /i/ shift had already occurred in the 4th century BC but was resisted in Koine by conservative interference. Also notable is the continued use of the digamma ϝ for /w/.

....Διουκλεῖς κὴ Κωτίλα ἀντίθεντι τὰν ϝιδίαν θρεπτάν, ἧ ὄνιουμα Ζωπουρίνα, ἱαρ[ὰν] τεῖ Σεράπει, παραμείνασαν αὐτεῖς ἇς κα ζῶνθι ἀνενκλείτως, τὰν ἀνάθεσιν ποιούμενει διὰ τῶ σ[ο]υνεδρίω κατὰ τὸν νόμον.

Greek pronunciation: [...diuklêːs kɛː koːtílaː antítʰenti taːn widíaːn tʰreptán, hɛː ónjuma zoːpuríːnaː, hiaràn teː serápeː, paraméːnaːsan auteːs hâs kaː zôːntʰi aneŋkléːtoːs, taːn anátʰesin pojúːmeneː dia toː sunhedríoː kata ton nómon.]
Diocles and Cotila dedicate their slave, whose name is Zopurina, to the safe keeping of Serapis, provided that she has remained in service with them blamelessly for as long as they live; they make this dedication through the council according to the law.

=== Learned pronunciation, 4th century BC to 2nd century AD ===
Until the beginning of Roman times, some learned speakers may have retained a conservative pronunciation that preserved many traits of the Ancient Greek phonological system. For example, well into the Roman period, there are indications from musical inscriptions and grammarians such as Velius Longus and Philostratus of the preservation of the vowel length and the pitch accent. More educated speakers may have engaged in code-switching between the popular Koine variety in everyday speech and the archaizing pronunciation in formal, poetic or musical settings. However, the learned pronunciation appears to have disappeared by the 2nd century AD, even in Attic official inscriptions.

The "learned pronunciation" described here is mostly pre-Koine Attic.

==== Short vowels ====
	Front		Back
	unrounded	rounded	rounded
Close	/i/ ῐ	/y/ ῠ	
Mid	/e̞/ ε		/o̞/ ο
Open	/a/ ᾰ		

==== Long vowels ====
	Front		Back
	unrounded	rounded	
Close	/iː/ ῑ, ει/_C or #, (ῃ)	/yː/ ῡ, (υι)	/uː/ ου
Close-mid or Mid	/eː/ η, ει/_V, (ῃ)		/oː/ ω
Open	/aː/ ᾱ		

The ει pseudo-diphthong was confused with ι in manuscripts except before a vowel, when it was confused with η, and so it probably retained its ancient value there. A monophthongal pronunciation of υι as /yː/ is written in parentheses as a dialectal trait of Great Attic beginning in the late classical period. In addition, ῃ probably first lost its final element and merged with /eː/ but was later raised to /iː/ (as seen in alternations between spellings of ῃ/ει for the second-person singular middle ending). Both pronunciations are given as possible dialectal variants.

==== Diphthongs ====
	Front offglide			Back offglide		
	/ai/ αι	/oi/ οι	/yi/ (υι)	/au/ αυ	/eu/ ευ	
(Long first element)	/aː(i)/ ᾳ	/oː(i)/ ῳ		/aː(u)/ ᾱυ	/eː(u)/ ηυ	/oː(u)/ ωυ

Long first element diphthongs are written in parentheses because they were gradually monophthongized starting from the classical period; Dionysius of Halicarnassus prescribes them as a "correct" pronunciation, indicating that the diphthongs were no longer pronounced in natural speech. By the 1st century BC, monophthongization had been completed (see diachronic description below for more details).

==== Stop consonants ====
	Bilabial	Dental	Velar
voiceless	/p/ π	/t/ τ	/k/ κ
voiced	/b/ β	/d/ δ	/ɡ/ γ
aspirated voiceless	/pʰ/ φ	/tʰ/ θ	/kʰ/ χ

Ancient grammarians and transcriptions suggest that the voiced and aspirated stop consonants were retained until the beginning of the Roman period. The voiced stops probably became fricatives before the voiceless aspirates.

==== Other consonants ====
Nasals	/m/ μ	/n/ ν (~ [ŋ]) γ
Liquids	/l/ λ	/r/ (~ [r̥] ?) ρ (ῥ)
Sibilant	/s/ σ	/z/ ζ, σ
Aspirate	/h/ ῾	

Some scholars regard [ŋ] as an allophone of [n], others as a separate phoneme, and so it is put in parentheses.

The exact sound that ῥ represented is a matter of discussion, but it should probably be regarded as an allophone of /r/, written ρ.

ζ denotes a /zz/ geminate between vowels.

==== Accentuation ====
Learned speech retained the tonal accent system of Ancient Greek.

==== Sample phonetic transcription ====
The following excerpt is part of a decree of the Roman Senate to the town of Thisbae in Boeotia in 170 BC. It was transcribed with a conservative variety of Koine in the early Roman period. The transcription shows partial (pre-consonantal/word-final) raising of ῃ and ει to /iː/, the retention of the pitch accent, and the retention of word-initial /h/ (the rough breathing).

περὶ ὧν Θισ[β]εῖς λόγους ἐποιήσαντο· περὶ τῶν καθ᾿αὑ[τ]οὺς πραγμάτων, οἵτινες ἐν τῆι φιλίαι τῆι ἡμετέραι ἐνέμειναν, ὅπως αὐτοῖς δοθῶσιν [ο]ἷς τὰ καθ᾿ αὑτοὺς πράγματα ἐξηγήσωνται, περὶ τούτου τοῦ πράγματος οὕτως ἔδοξεν· ὅπως Κόιντος Μαίνιος στρατηγὸς τῶν ἐκ τῆς συνκλήτου [π]έντε ἀποτάξηι οἳ ἂν αὐτῶι ἐκ τῶν δημοσίων πρα[γμ]άτων καὶ τῆς ἰδίας πίστεως φαίνωνται.
Greek pronunciation: [peri hoːn tʰizbîːs lóɡuːs epojéːsanto; peri toːn katʰ hautûːs praːɡmátoːn, hoítines en tiː pʰilíaːi tiː heːmetéraːi enémiːnan, hópoːs autois dotʰôːsin hois ta katʰ hautùːs práːɡmata ekseːɡéːsoːntai, peri túːtuː tuː práːɡmatos húːtoːs édoksen; hópoːs ˈkʷintos ˈmainios strateːɡòs toːn ek teːs syŋkléːtuː pénte apotáksiː, hoi an autoːi ek toːn deːmosíoːn praːɡmátoːn kai teːs idíaːs písteoːs pʰaínoːntai.]
Concerning those matters about which the citizens of Thisbae made representations. Concerning their own affairs: the following decision was taken concerning the proposal that those who remained true to our friendship should be given the facilities to conduct their own affairs; that our praetor/governor Quintus Maenius should delegate five members of the senate who seemed to him appropriate in the light of their public actions and individual good faith.

=== Egyptian Greek, mid-2nd century BC ===
By around 150 BC, Egyptian Greek had monophthongized its diphthongs and lost the distinction in vowel length.

==== Vowels ====
	Front		Back
	unrounded	rounded	rounded
Close	/i/ ι, ει/_C or #, ῃ	/y/ υ	/u/ ου
Close-mid or Near-close	/e̝/(?) ει/_V, η	/ø/(?), οι	
Mid	/e̞/ ε, αι		/o̞/ ο, ω, ῳ
Open	/a/ α, ᾳ		

The confusion of ο with ω and of ε with αι in Egypt began in this period. However, υ was not confused with οι before the 1st century BC and so was still represented in the intermediate phase of /ø/. υ remained rounded but apparently merged with /i/ in certain conditions (see sample text below). Further confusion of ο/ω and ου was also common, indicating a neutralization of /o/ and /u/, perhaps with a closer articulation of /o/. However, the distinction between close and mid-back vowels is still maintained in the chart because that development was likely an isolated regional trait related to Coptic influence, not one that affected the development of the language generally.

η was apparently distinguished from ε in quality but also was not regularly confused with ι. Therefore, it may represent the intermediate stage of a near-close vowel /e̝/, pushed up the frontal axis to /i/ along with the raising of /ɛː/ (αι) to /e/. Once again, the new vowel is also the prevocalic value of ει. An alternative route of development taken by other scholars is that αι, which had initially monophthongized as /æː/, and ε /e/ merged and acquired a middle value of /ɛ/, distinguished from the new close-mid /e/ (written η); the result of the merger would then be raised to /e/ once η had merged with ι.

==== Diphthongs ====
/aw/(?) αυ	/ew/(?) ευ	/yi/ υι

The transition of αυ and ευ from /au/, /eu/ to /aβ/, /eβ/ was likely already in progress. A probable intermediate semivocalic stage is therefore presented here. The diphthong /yi/ was apparently retained in Egyptian at least in this century.

==== Stop and former stop consonants ====
	Bilabial	Dental	Palatal	Velar
voiceless	/p/ π	/t/ τ		/k/ κ
voiced	/b/ β	/d/ δ	(~ [ʝ]) γ	/ɣ/ γ
aspirated voiceless	/pʰ/ φ	/tʰ/ θ		/kʰ/ χ

Evidence for a fricative γ in Egyptian Greek dates as far back to the 4th century BC. From the 2nd century BC, it includes omissions and insertions of γ before front vowels, which indicate a palatal fricative allophone in such positions. However, they may not have been standard pronunciations. β likely did not become a fricative till the 1st century AD. Fricative pronunciation for aspirates may have been generalized even later in Egyptian Greek.

==== Other consonants ====
Nasals	/m/ μ, ν	/n/ ν (~ [ŋ]) γ
Liquids	/l/ λ	/r/ (~ [r̥ʰ] ?) ρ (ῥ)
Sibilant	/s/ σ	/z/ ζ, σ
(Aspirate)	/h/ ῾	

Aspiration may have begun to disappear from popular speech in the 1st century BC.

==== Accentuation ====
The accent had changed to a stress accent.

==== Sample phonetic transcription ====
The following late Ptolemaic Egyptian papyrus from 154 BC is rendered in the popular pronunciation, including the loss of vowel length distinction and the shift to a stress accent. The substitution of αι for ε points to monophthongization; for οι, this is still in the intermediate phase of /ø/, as inferred by the lack of confusion with υ. The interchange of ι for η and υ suggests an early raising to /i/ for the former and the loss of lip-rounding for the latter, which occurs only in highly restricted phonetic conditions (i.e. in labial environments) or may be an isolated dialectal trait. Horrocks's transcription already has a fricative γ with a palatal allophone before front vowels.

συγγέγραμμαι τῆι Ἑσπέρου θυγατρί, μέλλω δὲ ἰσάγειν ἐν τῷ Μεσορὴ μηνί. καλῶς ποιήσεις ἀποστεῖλαί μοι ἰμίχουν ἐλαίου. γέγραφ’ ἱμεῖν ἵνα εἰδῆται...παραγενοῦ δὲ εἰς τὴν ἡμέραν.
[syŋ ̍ɡeɣrame ti heˈsperu tʰyɣaˈtri, ˈmelo de iˈsaʝin en do mesoˈri miˈni. kaˈlos poˈje̝sis apoˈstilˈe mø iˈmikʰun eˈleu. ˈʝeɣrapʰ hiˈmin hina iˈdite...paraʝeˈnu de is te̝n he̝ˈmeran.]
I have made a contract with the daughter of Hesperos, and I shall marry her in the month of Mesore. Please send half a chous (a liquid measure) of oil. I have written to you so that you may know...Come for the (wedding) day.

=== Popular pronunciation, 2nd century BC – 3rd century AD ===
The loss of vowel length and the spread of Greek under Alexander the Great led to a reorganization of the vowels in the phonology of Koine Greek. Vowel length distinctions appear to have been lost first in Egypt and then in Anatolia by the 2nd century BC, with Greek inscriptions beginning to display short-long vowel confusions from the 1st century BC that had become widespread by the 2nd century AD. The process was perhaps largely generalized in most dialects by the 2nd century AD.

	Front		Back
	unrounded	rounded	rounded
Close	/i/ ι, ει, ῃ	/y/ υ, οι, υι	/u/ ου
Near Close	/e̝/(?) η		
Mid	/e̞/ ε, αι		/o̞/ ω, ο, ῳ
Open	/a/ α, ᾳ		

Monophthongization had completed by the 1st century BC, with the final merger of οι and υ.

==== Former diphthongs ====
[aɸʷ, aβʷ](?) αυ	[eɸʷ, eβʷ](?) ευ

In the Roman period, the diphthongs αυ and ευ developed narrower articulations, possibly closing to [aɸʷ, aβʷ], [eɸʷ, eβʷ] or even, depending on when lip-rounding was lost, [aɸ, aβ] and [eɸ, eβ]. Before the 4th century AD, interchanges of αυ/ευ with α(υ)ου/ε(υ)ου are still more common than confusions with αβ/εβ and so many, if not most, speakers probably preserved the earlier pronunciations of the second element as a semi-vowel or labialized consonant.

==== Stop and former stop consonants ====
	Bilabial	Dental	Palatal	Velar
voiceless stop	/p/ π	/t/ τ		/k/ κ
voiced	/β/ β	/d/ δ	(~ [ʝ]) γ	/ɣ/ γ
voiceless	/pʰ/, (/ɸ/?) φ	/tʰ/, (/θ/?) θ		/kʰ/, (/x/?) χ

By the 1st century, the voiced consonants β and γ had become fricatives /β/ and /ɣ/, but δ probably remained a plosive until the 3rd century. Despite the lack of clear evidence for the fricativization of aspirated plosives in Koine, φ, θ and χ perhaps started to become fricatives in areas outside Egypt, such as the northern Mediterranean. See discussion below.

==== Other consonants ====
Nasals	/m/ μ	/n/ ν (~ [ŋ]) γ
Liquids	/l/ λ	/r/ ρ
Sibilant	/s/ σ	/z/ ζ, σ
(Aspirate)	(/h/) ῾	

Aspiration had probably dropped out of popular speech but possibly remained a characteristic of learned speech.

Accentuation lost distinctions of high and high-low tones and left only a high tone for a "stress" accent.

==== Sample phonetic transcription ====
The following papyrus letter from 100 AD is again transcribed in the popular Koine pronunciation. It now shows fricative values for the second element in diphthongs αυ/ευ and for β except in transliterations of Latin names, but aspirated plosives remain plosive. Monophthongization and the loss of vowel length are clearly seen in the graphic interchanges of ι/ει, υ/οι and ω/o. Also, there is frequent post-nasal voicing of voiceless stops, which is strengthened in Egypt from Coptic influence but was eventually standardized everywhere and is a rule in Modern Greek.

Λούκιος Βελλήνος Γέμελλος Σαβίνωι τῶι οιεἱῶι χαίρειν. εὖ οὖν πυήσας κομισάμενός μου τὴν ἐπιστολὴν πέμσις μυ Πίνδαρον εἰς τὴν πόλιν τὸν πεδιοφύλακα τῆς Διονυσιάδος, ἐπὶ ἐρώτησέ με Ἑρμοναξ εἵνα αὐτὸν λάβῃ εἰς Κερκεσοῦχα καταμαθῖν τὸν ἐλαιῶνα αὐτοῦ, ἐπὶ πυκνός ἐστιν και θέλι ἐξ αὐτὸν ἐκκόψαι φυτά, εἵνα ἐνπίρος κοπῇ τὰ μέλλοντα ἐκκόπτεσθαι.
Greek pronunciation: [ˈlucios beˈle̝nos ˈɟemelos saˈbino to hyˈjo ˈcʰerin. ev un pyˈe̝sas komiˈsameˈnoz mu te̝n epistoˈle̝(n) ˈpem(p)siz my ˈpindaron is te̝m ˈbolin tom bedioˈpʰylaka tiz djonyˈsjados, eˈpi eˈrote̝ˈse me erˈmonaks in(a) a(f)ton ˈlavi is cerceˈsukʰa katamaˈtʰi(n) ton eleˈon(a) a(f)tu, eˈpi pyˈknos estin ce ˈtʰeli eks afˈton eˈkopse pʰyˈta, ina emˈbiros koˈpi ta ˈmelonda eˈkoptestʰe.]
Lucius Bellenus Gemellus to his son Sabinus greetings. On receipt of my letter you will kindly send me Pindarus the field-guard from Dionysias to the city, as Hermonax has asked me for permission to take him to Kerkesoucha to examine his olive grove, as it is dense and he wants to cut out some trees from it, so that those to be cut down may be cut skillfully.

=== 4th century AD ===
By the 4th century AD, the loss of vowel length distinction and aspiration had most probably become generalized. η was often confused with ι (and hence was pronounced /i/?) but still occasionally with ε (presumably pronounced /e/, as it still is today in Eastern – i. e., Pontic and Cappadocian – Greek dialects). Fricative values for the former voiced and aspirate stop consonants were probably already common, but some dialects may have retained voiced and aspirate stop consonants until the end of the 1st millennium. The pronunciation suggested here, though far from being universal, is essentially that of Modern Greek except for the continued roundedness of /y/.

==== Vowels ====
	Front		Back
	unrounded	rounded	rounded
Close	/i/ ι, ει, η, ῃ	/y/ υ, οι, υι	/u/ ου
Mid	/e̞/ ε, αι, some η (dialectal?)		/o̞/ ο, ω, ῳ
Open	/a/ α, ᾳ		

There is some confusion between η and ι in Attic and Asia Minor two centuries earlier. However, in the papyri, it is only from this period that interchange with symbols for /i/ becomes as common as between ι/ει, ε/αι or υ/οι. The confusion between /y/ and /i/ had begun as early as the 2nd century BC in Egyptian Greek, but it was most probably not yet generalized in all phonetic positions.

==== Former diphthongs ====
[af, av] αυ	[ef, ev] ευ

The full transition of αυ and ευ to /av, ev/ may have been generalized by this time.

==== Stop and former stop consonants ====
	Labial	Dental	Palatal	Velar
voiceless stop	/p/ π	/t/ τ	(~ [c]?) κ	/k/ κ
voiced fricative	/v/ β	/ð/ δ	(~ [ʝ]) γ	/ɣ/ γ
formerly aspirated voiceless fricative	/f/ φ	/θ/ θ	(~ [ç]?) χ	/x/ χ

Despite the lack of evidence for the latter change in Egyptian papyri, it is perhaps not reasonable assumption that fricative values for both former voiced stops and voiceless aspirated stops were common in many other dialects. It is uncertain as to when the palatal allophones for the velars /k/ and /x/ appeared.

==== Other consonants ====
Nasals	/m/ μ	/n/ ν (~ [ŋ]) γ
Liquids	/l/ λ	/r/ ρ
Sibilant	/s/ σ	/z/ ζ, σ

==== Accentuation ====
The stress accent system was probably generalized.

==== Sample phonetic transcription ====
The following excerpt from a late-4th-century AD papyrus letter is rendered in late Roman and early Byzantine era popular Koine. The loss of vowel length and monophthongization are presumed to be nearly universal in all regions, as is seen in the familiar interchanges of ι/ει, υ/οι, ε/αι and ω/ο. The misspelling of ὕμισυ for ἥμισυ again suggests, as noted above, that both η and υ had merged with ι/ει before labials. By now, however, η (earlier Koine /e̝/?) had possibly fully raised to /i/ in all positions, as is shown in the transcription. Aspiration has been lost, and both voiced plosives and voiceless aspirated plosives have become fricatives. The omission of γ in the misspelling ὑιέvovτα (ὑγιαί–) may reflect a palatal allophone [ʝ] of the velar fricative /ɣ/ before front vowels.

τῇ κυρία μου ἀδ[ελ]φῇ Μανατίνῃ Πρώβ[ο]ς ἀδελφὼ χαίριν. πρὼ [μ]ὲν πάντων εὔχωμαι τῷ κυρίῳ θεῷ περὶ τῆς σῆς ὡλοκληρίας ὅπως ὑιένοντα σοὶ καὶ εὐθυμοῦντι ἀπωλάβῃς τὰ παρ' ἐμοῦ γράμματα. [γι]γνώσκιν σε θέλω, κυρία μου ἀδελφή, ἄπελθε πρὸς Πετρώνιν τὼν ἐνγυησάμενόν μου δέξε ἀ[π' ἀ]ὐτοῦ ἐκ τοῦ μισθοῦ μου ἕναν ὕμισυ...
Greek pronunciation: [ti cyˈria mu aðelˈfi manaˈtini ˈprovos aðelˈfo(s) ˈçerin. pro men ˈpandon ˈefxome to cyˈrio θeˈο peri tis sis olokliˈrias opos yˈʝenonda sy ce efθiˈmundi apoˈlavis ta par emu ˈɣramata. ʝi(ɣ)ˈnosci(n) se ˈθelo, cyˈria mu aðelˈfi, ˈapelθe pros peˈtronin ton eŋɡyiˈsameno(n) mu. ˈðekse ap afˈtu ek tu misˈθumu enan ˈimisi...]
To my lady sister Manatine Probus her brother greetings. Above all I pray to the Lord God concerning your well-being that you receive my letter in good health and in good spirits. I want you to know, my lady sister, (that you must) go to Petronius my guarantor. Get from him out of my pay one and a half (talents)...

== Diachronic phonetic description ==
=== Loss of vowel quantity distinction ===
The ancient distinction between long and short vowels was lost in popular speech at the beginning of the Koine period: "By the mid-second century [BC] however, the majority system had undergone important changes, most notably monophthongization, the loss of distinctive length, and the shift to a primary stress accent."

From the 2nd century BC, spelling errors in non-literary Egyptian papyri suggest a stress accent and the loss of vowel length distinction. The widespread confusion between ο and ω in Attic inscriptions starting in the 2nd century AD was probably caused by a loss of vowel length distinction.

=== Transition to stress accent ===
The means of accenting words changed from pitch to stress and so the accented syllable had only one tone option (high) and was presumably louder or stronger. The shift directly corresponded with monophthongization and the loss of vowel length distinctions, which destroyed the environment in which a pitch accent could be sustained.

From the mid-2nd-century BC, spelling errors all over the Mediterranean, including occasional omissions of unaccented vowels, suggest a loss of vowel length distinction, which is commonly thought to result in the loss of tonal accent. More evidence of stress accent appears in poetry starting from the late 2nd century AD and the early 3rd century AD.

=== Diphthongs ===
==== Spurious diphthongs ====
Before a consonant, the diphthong ει had started to become monophthongal in Attic as early as the 6th century BC and was pronounced like ε̄, probably as /eː/. From the late 4th century BC in Attic, the spurious diphthong (pseudo-diphthong) ει (now notating both etymological ει and etymological ε̄) came to be pronounced like ῑ, probably as /iː/ (with the quality that the digraph still has in modern Greek).

Before a vowel, the diphthong ει did not follow the same evolution as pre-consonantal ει. One theory to explain the difference is that pre-vocalic ει may have kept a diphthongal value [ej] until the 4th century BC, the [j] being progressively perceived as a glide from /e/ to the next vowel. From the late 4th century BC, the pre-vocalic diphthong ει came to be confused with η, which implies that unlike before a consonant, it retained the value /eː/, probably with a loss of openness distinction with η; for later evolution, refer to η below.

Starting from the 6th century in Attic, the diphthong ου had been monophthongized and confused with ο̄. While its initial value had probably been /oː/, it must have evolved to /uː/ quite early (possibly in the 6th century BC and at any rate before 350 BC), a vowel quality that has been preserved in Modern Greek.

==== Short-first-element i diphthongs ====
The diphthong αι was probably monophthongized at first as /ε(ː)/. This value is attested in Boeotian in the early 4th century BC, with the Boeotian spelling of η for αι. The confusion of αι with ε suggests that the transition had taken place by the mid-2nd century BC in Egyptian Greek. Further confusion between αι and ε is found in Palestine in the early 2nd century, and the confusion between αι and ε starting from c. 125 AD in Attic suggests that monophthongization took place in the early 2nd century AD in learned Attic. Allen thinks the transition to /e/ (i.e. the loss of openness distinction with ε) to have taken place later; while Allen is not very explicit on this point, the theory seems to be based on the observation that while both η and αι are confused with ε, αι is not confused with η. However, not all scholars seem to agree. No reference on this point of debate has been found.

The diphthong οι was monophthongized as /yː/ or /y/ (depending on when the loss of vowel length distinction took place). This is attested in Boeotian as early as the 3rd century BC, with a spelling of υ for οι, but that was probably a dialectal trait. Still, the diphthong οι must have kept a diphthongal value at least in learned language until Roman times, as it is transcribed as oe in Latin. Further evidence of monophthongization is found from the early 1st century BC in Egyptian Greek, as well as in the early 2nd century AD in Palestine. Monophthongization in the learned language seems to be attested by a υ spelling for οι that is found in a text dated from the early 2nd century AD and another from c. 240 AD. (Look up note on evolution of υ for subsequent evolution.)

Koine Greek initially seems to feature the diphthong υι, which had been progressively monophthongized to /yː/ (written υ for ῡ) in Attic from the 6th century BC to the 4th century BC but had been retained in other Greek dialects. It was later monophthongized as /yː/ or /y/ (depending on when the loss of vowel length distinction took place). The author of toese lines has not found any reference on when this change took place, but this transition may be phonologically linked to and, at any rate is quite unlikely to have taken place after, the similar transition of οι to /y(ː)/. (See discussion on υ below for subsequent evolution.)

==== Short-first-element u diphthongs ====
The diphthongs αυ and ευ lost their ancient value of /au, eu/ and fortified to a fricative consonantal pronunciation of /aβ, eβ/ or /av, ev/ through the likely intermediate stages of /aw, ew/ and then [aβʷ, eβʷ] Sporadic confusions of αυ/ευ with αβ/εβ, which attest a fricative pronunciation, are found as early as 3rd century BC in Boeotia and in 2nd century BC in Egypt. Further such confusions appear rarely in the papyri in the early 1st century AD. However, Gignac notes that before the late Roman and early Byzantine period, spellings with α(υ)ου/ε(υ)ου are more common, which more likely represent the earlier transitional phases of /aw, ew/ or [aβʷ, eβʷ]. Allen also believes that the fricative pronunciation was not generalized at once; for instance, Jewish catacombs inscriptions still show a diphthongal value in the 2nd–3rd centuries AD. Confusion of αυ and ευ with αβ/εβ becomes increasingly common in late Roman and early Byzantine times, which suggests that it had been generalized by then. Outside Egypt, spellings with αβ/εβ are also found in Asia Minor from the late Roman period. Finally, indirect evidence comes from transcriptions into foreign languages, such as Coptic ϩⲓⲡⲡⲉϥ (Hippef) for ἱππεῦ (2nd century AD), or Byzantine Late Hebrew/Aramaic transcriptions of αυ/ευ with אב (ab-).

==== Long-first-element i diphthongs ====
The diphthong ῃ had started to monophthongize in Attic at least as early as the 4th century BC since it was often written ει and probably pronounced [eː]. In Koine Greek, ῃ, therefore, was ussually subjected to the same evolution as the original classical /eː/ and came to be pronounced /i(ː)/. However, in some inflexional endings (mostly the first-declension dative singular and the third-person singular subjunctive), the evolution was partially reverted from c. 200 BC, probably by analogy of forms of other cases and persons, to η and was probably pronounced /eː/ at first (see the note on the evolution of η for the subsequent evolution).

Other long-first-element ι diphthongs (ᾳ and ῳ) monophthongized by the 2nd century BC, as they were written α and ω; the former was probably pronounced /a(ː)/, and the latter may have been at first pronounced /ɔ(ː)/ if the distinction in openness had not been lost, and it was eventually pronounced /o(ː)/ at any rate (see the discussion of the single vowels ο and ω below for details). From the 2nd century AD, Atticism caused the widespread reintroduction of the ancient spelling with the final ι, but in any case, it was not pronounced.

==== Long-first-element u diphthongs ====
When augmented from ευ in verbs, the diphthong ηυ had been changed to ευ from the 4th century BC.

Other long-first-element υ diphthongs (ᾱυ, ηυ and ωυ) had monophthongized in the 1st century BC, as they were written as α, η and ω; the first was probably pronounced /a(ː)/, and the other two may have been pronounced /ɛ(ː)/ and /ɔ(ː)/ at first if the distinction in openness had not been lost (/e(ː)/ and /o(ː)/ otherwise), and they were eventually pronounced /i(ː)/ and /o(ː)/ at any rate (see the discussion on the single vowels ο and ω and the single vowel η below for details).

=== Single vowel quality ===
Apart from η, simple vowels have preserved their ancient pronunciation better than have diphthongs.

As noted above, at the start of Koine Greek, the pseudo-diphthong ει before a consonant had a value of /iː/, and the pseudo-diphthong ου had a value of [uː]; those vowel qualities have remained unchanged in Modern Greek. The diphthong ει before a vowel had been generally monophthongized to a value of /i(ː)/ and confused with η; it thus shared the later developments of η.

The quality of the vowels α, ε̆, ι and ο have remained unchanged through Modern Greek as /a/, /e/, /i/ and /o/.

The vowels ο and ω started to be regularly confused in Attic inscriptions in the 2nd century AD, which may indicate that the quality distinction was lost around then. However, ir may as well indicate the loss of length distinction, with an earlier or simultaneous loss of quality distinction. Indeed, the fact that some less systematic confusion is found in Attic inscriptions from the 4th century BC may alternatively point to a loss of openness distinction in the 4th century BC, and the systematization of the confusion in the 2nd century AD would then have been caused by the loss of length distinction.

The quality distinction between η and ε may have been lost in Attic in the late 4th century BC, when pre-consonantic pseudo-diphthong ει started to be confused with ι and pre-vocalic diphthong ει with η. C. 150 AD, Attic inscriptions started to confuse η and ι, which indicates the appearance of a /iː/ or /i/ (depending on when the loss of vowel length distinction took place) pronunciation, which is still in usage in Standard Modern Greek; however, it seems that some locutors retained the /e̝/ pronunciation for some time, as Attic inscriptions continued to in parallel confuse η and ε, and transcriptions into Gothic and to some extent Old Armenian transcribe η as e. Additionally, it is to be noted that while the interchange of η and ι/ει occurs during the Ptolemaic and Roman period, but it is only in restrictive phonetic conditions or possibly by grammatical developments. Moreover, itacism still shows exceptions in Asia Minor Greek, especially Pontic Greek, where η partially merges with ε, instead of with ι.

Koine Greek adopted for the vowel υ the pronunciation /y/ of Ionic-Attic. The confusion of υ with ι appears in Egyptian papyri from the 2nd century BC to the 2nd century AD, which suggests a pronunciation of /i/, but it occurs only in restricted phonetic conditions or may be a regional trait (since Coptic did not have /y/). Transcriptions to Gothic and to some extent Armenian suggest that υ still retained a /y/ pronunciation, and the transition to /i/ in mainstream Greek is thought to have taken place at the end of the 1st millennium.

=== Loss of aspiration ===
The aspirate breathing (aspiration, referring here to the phoneme /h/, which is usually marked by the rough breathing sign), which was already lost in the Ionic idioms of Asia Minor and the Aeolic of Lesbos (psilosis), later stopped being pronounced in Koine Greek. Incorrect or hypercorrect markings of assimilatory aspiration (i.e. an unaspirated plosive becomes aspirated before initial aspiration) in Egyptian papyri suggest that the loss was already occurring in Egyptian Greek in the late 1st century BC. Transcriptions into foreign languages and consonant changes before aspirate testify that the transition must not have been generalized before the 2nd century AD, but transcriptions into Gothic show that it was at least well under way in the 4th century AD.

=== Consonants ===
The consonants β, δ, γ ζ, φ, θ and χ all shifted over the course of the Koine period, but there is disagreement regarding timing of sound changes, and likely varied by dialect.

The consonant ζ, which had probably a value of /zd/ in Classical Attic (though some scholars have argued in favor of a value of /dz/, and the value probably varied according to dialects: see Zeta (letter) for further discussion), acquired the sound /z/, which it still has in Modern Greek, seemingly with a geminate pronunciation /zz/ at least between vowels. Attic inscriptions suggest that this pronunciation was already common by the late 4th century BC.

Horrocks agrees with Gignac on finding evidence that geminate consonants tended to simplify beginning from the 3rd century BC, as seen in their arbitrary use in less literate writing. However, degemination was not carried out universally since southern Italian, south-eastern and some Asia Minor dialects preserve double consonants.

The consonants φ, θ and χ, which were initially pronounced as aspirates /pʰ/, /tʰ/ and /kʰ/, developed into fricatives /f/, [θ] and [x~ç]. There is evidence for fricative θ in Laconian in the 5th century BC, but that is unlikely to have influenced Koine Greek, which is largely based on Ionic-Attic. According to Allen, the first clear evidence for the fricatives φ and θ in Koine Greek dates from the 1st century AD in Latin Pompeian inscriptions, which transcribe φ and θ with f: Dafne is found for Δάφνη and lasfe for λάσθη.

Jewish catacombs from the 2nd century in Rome show afrodisia written for Ἀφροδισία. Evidence from Anatolia showing interchanges between φ and υ/ου in Anatolian names also suggest a fricative pronunciation /ɸ/ or /f/, such as οαφα, οαυα and οαουα. Late Roman interchanges between θ and σ, similar to the ancient Laconian spellings, show evidence of the fricative θ.

However, evidence suggests an aspirate pronunciation for θ in Palestine in the early 2nd century, and the same Jewish catacomb inscriptions of the 2nd–3rd centuries AD suggest a pronunciation of /f/ for φ, /tʰ/ for θ and /kʰ/ for χ, which would testify that the transition of θ to a fricative had not yet become general, and it suggests that the transition of φ to a fricative may have happened before the transition of θ and χ. There may also be evidence for fricative φ in 2nd-century AD Attic in the form of omission of the second element in the ευ diphthongs (which were pronounced [ef, ev]) before φ. Armenian transcriptions transcribe χ as /kʰ/ until the 10th century AD and so it seems that χ was pronounced as aspirate by at least some speakers until then. More evidence for fricative former aspirated stops comes from the Late Roman period. The 4th-century Gothic Bible by Ulfilas transcribes φ and θ with Gothic f and þ. Kantor also finds strong evidence for a fricative χ in the 4th-century Codex Vaticanus Bible, which transcribes the Hebrew letters ר and ש as ῥήχς and χσέν, with the sequence χσ apparently used to represent the sound /ʃ/, which would make sense only if χσ were pronounced [sç]. In 5th-century Egyptian papyri, there are also a handful of instances of φ being transcribed as Latin f: egrafe for ἐγράφη, foibammonos for Φοιβάμμων, Epifaniu for Ἐπιφάνιος.

There is disagreement as to when the consonants β, γ and δ, which were originally pronounced /b/, /ɡ/, /d/, acquired the value of /v/, [ɣ~ʝ] and /ð/ that they have in Modern Greek. There is evidence of a fricative γ as far back as the 4th century BC in the form of omissions before a back vowel. In the papyri from the 2nd century BC, γ is sometimes omitted or inserted before a front vowel, which indicates a palatal allophone [ʝ] or [j]. However, Allen considers that they were not a standard pronunciation. Some scholars have argued that the replacement of old Greek ϝ /w/ with β in certain late classical dialects indicates a fricative pronunciation. Ancient grammarians describe the plosive nature of those letters, β is transcribed as b, not v, in Latin and Cicero still seems to identify β with Latin b. Gignac finds evidence from non-literary papyri suggesting a fricative pronunciation in some contexts (mostly intervocalic) from about the 1st century AD in the form of the use of β to transcribe Latin ⟨v⟩ (which was also undergoing a fortition process from semi-vowel /w/ to fricative /β/.) However, Allen is again sceptical that this pronunciation was generalized yet. The increasingly common confusion of αυ and ευ with αβ and εβ in late Roman and early Byzantine times suggests that the fricative pronunciation of β had become common, if not general, by then.

However, it is not before the 10th century AD that transcriptions of β as the fricative <վ> [v], or γ as voiced velar <ղ> ł (pronounced [ɣ~ʁ]) are found in Armenian, which suggests that the transition was not general before the end of the 1st millennium though previous transcriptions may have been learned transcriptions. Georgian loans in the 9th and the 10th centuries similarly show inconsistency in transcribing β and γ as a stop or fricative; β is consistently rendered as ბ b, rather than ვ v, and γ may be written with an adapted symbol ღ for fricative /ɣ/ or with ჟ [ʒ] (approximating [ʝ] in palatal position) but also with stop გ g. There is probable evidence for a peculiarly early shift of /d/ > /ð/ in 6th-century BC Elean, as is seen in use of ζ for δ. Gignac interprets similar spellings in the Egyptian papyri beginning in the 1st century AD as the spirant pronunciation for δ in the Koine, but before the 4th century AD, they occur only before /i/. However, not all scholars agree in there being a reasonable phonetic basis for the earlier fricativization of δ before ι.

The weakness of final ν /n/, frequently before a stop consonant, is attested in Egypt in both Hellenistic and Roman times and is seen directly in its omission and hypercorrect insertion, but its complete loss would not occur until the medieval period, excluding the southern Italian, south-eastern and Asia Minor dialects. The development of the voiced allophones [b], [d], [ɡ] of voiceless stops π, τ and κ after nasals is also evidenced in Pamphylia as early as the 4th century BC and in the Egyptian papyri (mostly from the Roman period) in the interchange with β, δ, and γ in post-nasal positions (where those letters retained their ancient plosive values, as noted above.) Hence μπ, ντ, γκ would later be used for /b/, /d/, /ɡ/, via the assimilation to the second element. In Egypt, that development is seen as an influence of the Coptic substrate. However, the change remains standard in Modern Greek and so it appears to have occurred in other areas as well.

== See also ==
- Koine Greek
- Ancient Greek phonology
- Modern Greek phonology

== Bibliography ==
- Bubeník, Vít (1989), Hellenistic and Roman Greece as a sociolinguistic area, Amsterdam and Philadelphia: John Benjamins Publishing Company, ISBN 90-272-3551-1
- Allen, W. Sidney (1987), Vox Graeca: A Guide to the Pronunciation of Classical Greek (3rd ed.), Cambridge: Cambridge University Press, ISBN 0-521-33555-8
- Buth, Randall (2008), Living Koine Greek, Part One, Jerusalem: Biblical Language Center, ISBN 978-965-7352-02-1
- Buth, Randall (2008), Ἡ κοινὴ προφορά: Notes on the Pronunciation System of Phonemic Koine Greek (PDF)
- Gignac, Francis T. (1976), A Grammar of the Greek Papyri of the Roman and Byzantine Periods: Vol. 1 Phonology, Milan: Istituto Editoriale Cisalpino-La Goliardica, ASIN B0006CVTGQ
- Horrocks, Geoffrey C. (1997), Greek: A History of the Language and Its Speakers, Longman, ISBN 978-0-582-30709-4
- Horrocks, Geoffrey (2010), Greek: A History of the Language and its Speakers (2nd ed.), Oxford: Wiley-Blackwell, ISBN 978-1-118-78515-7
- Kantor, Benjamin (2023), A Short Guide to the Pronunciation of Koine Greek, Eerdmans, ISBN 978-0-8028-7832-8
- Kantor, Benjamin (2022), "The LXX and Historical Greek Phonology: Orthography, Phonology, and Transcriptions", Journal for the Study of Judaism: 1–33
- Kantor, Benjamin, The Pronunciation of New Testament Greek Judeo-Palestinian Greek Phonology and Orthography from Alexander to Islam, Eerdmans, ISBN 9780802878311
- Lejeune, Michel (1972), Phonétique historique du mycénien et du grec ancien (2nd ed.), Paris: Éditions Klincksieck
- Schwyzer, Eduard (1990), Griechische Grammatik (6th ed.), Munich: Verlag C.H. Beck, ISBN 90-272-3551-1
- Teodorsson, Sven-Tage (1978), The phonology of Attic in the Hellenistic period, Göteborg: Göteborg University, ISBN 91-7346-059-1
- Teodorsson, Sven-Tage (1977), The phonology of Ptolemaic Koine, Göteborg: Göteborg University, ISBN 91-7346-035-4
