= Modern Greek phonology =

Sound system of standard Modern Greek

This article deals with the phonology and phonetics of Standard Modern Greek. For phonological characteristics of other varieties, see varieties of Modern Greek, and for Cypriot, specifically, see Cypriot Greek § Phonology.

== Consonants ==
Greek linguists do not agree on which consonants to count as phonemes in their own right, and which to count as conditional allophones. The table below is adapted from Arvaniti (2007, p. 7), who considers the palatals and both affricates, [t͡s] and [d͡z], to be allophonic.

Consonant phonemes
		Labial	Dental	Alveolar	Velar
Nasal		m ⟨μ⟩		n ⟨ν⟩	
Plosive	voiceless	p ⟨π⟩		t ⟨τ⟩	k ⟨κ⟩
Plosive	prenasal	ᵐb ⟨μπ⟩		ⁿd ⟨ντ⟩	ᵑɡ ⟨γκ⟩
Fricative	voiceless	f ⟨φ⟩	θ ⟨θ⟩	s ⟨σ, ς⟩	x ⟨χ⟩
Fricative	voiced	v ⟨β⟩	ð ⟨δ⟩	z ⟨ζ⟩	ɣ ⟨γ⟩
Tap				ɾ ⟨ρ⟩	
Approximant				l ⟨λ⟩	

- The alveolar nasal /n/ is assimilated to following obstruents; it can be labiodental (e.g. αμφιβολία [aɱfivoˈlia] 'doubt'), dental (e.g. άνθος [ˈan̪θos] 'flower'), retracted alveolar (e.g. πένσα [ˈpen̠sa] 'pliers'), alveolo-palatal (e.g. συγχύζω [siɲˈçizo] 'to annoy'), or velar (e.g. άγχος [ˈaŋхos] 'stress').
- Voiceless stops are unaspirated and with a very short voice onset time. They may be lightly voiced in rapid speech, especially when intervocalic. /t/'s exact place of articulation ranges from alveolar to denti-alveolar, to dental. It may be fricated [θ̠ ~ θ] in rapid speech, and very rarely, in function words, it is deleted. /p/ and /k/ are reduced to lesser degrees in rapid speech.
- Voiced stops are prenasalised (which is reflected in the orthography) to varying extents, and sometimes not at all. The nasal component—when present—does not increase the duration of the stop's closure; as such, prenasalised voiced stops would be most accurately transcribed [ᵐb ⁿd ᵑɡ] or [m͡b, n͡d, ŋ͡ɡ], depending on the length of the nasal component. Word-initially and after /r/ or /l/, they are very rarely, if ever, prenasalised. In rapid and casual speech, prenasalisation is generally rarer, and voiced stops may be lenited to fricatives. That also accounts for Greeks having trouble disambiguating voiced stops, nasalised voiced stops, and nasalised voiceless stops in borrowings and names from foreign languages such as, d, nd, and nt, which are all written ντ in Greek.
- /s/ and /z/ are somewhat retracted ([s̠, z̠]); they are produced in between English alveolars /s, z/ and postalveolars /ʃ, ʒ/. /s/ is variably fronted or further retracted depending on environment, and, in some cases, it may be better described as an advanced postalveolar ([ʃ˖]).
- The only Greek rhotic /ɾ/ is prototypically an alveolar tap [ɾ], often retracted ([ɾ̠]). It may be an alveolar approximant [ɹ] intervocalically, and is usually a trill [r] in clusters, with two or three short cycles.
- Greek has palatals [c, ɟ, ç, ʝ] which are allophones of the velar consonants /k, ɡ, x, ɣ/ before the front vowels /e, i/. The velars also merge with a following nonsyllabic /i/ to the corresponding palatal before the vowels /a, o, u/, e.g. χιόνι [ˈçoni] (= /ˈxi̯oni/) 'snow', thus producing a surface contrast between palatal and velar consonants before /a, o, u/. [l̠] and [ɲ̟] occur as allophones of /l/ and /n/, respectively, in CJV (consonant–glide–vowel) clusters, in analyses that posit an archiphoneme-like glide /J/ that contrasts with the vowel /i/. All palatals may be analysed in the same way. The palatal stops and fricatives are somewhat retracted, and [l̠] and [ɲ̟] are somewhat fronted. [l̠] is best described as postalveolar, and [ɲ̟] as alveolo-palatal.
- Finally, Greek has two phonetically affricate clusters, [t͡s] and [d͡z]. Arvaniti (2007) is reluctant to treat these as phonemes on the grounds of inconclusive research into their phonological behaviour.

Examples
πήρα	/ˈpiɾa/	'I took'
μπύρα	/ˈᵐbiɾa/	'beer'
φάση	/ˈfasi/	'phase'
βάση	/ˈvasi/	'base'
μόνος	/ˈmonos/	'alone'
νόμος	/ˈnomos/	'law'
τείνω	/ˈtino/	'I tend'
ντύνω	/ˈⁿdino/	'I dress'
θέμα	/ˈθema/	'topic'
δέμα	/ˈðema/	'parcel'
σώα	/ˈsoa/	'safe' (fem.)
ζώα	/ˈzoa/	'animals'
ρήμα	/ˈɾima/	'verb'
λίμα	/ˈlima/	'nail file'
κόμμα	/ˈkoma/	'comma'
χώμα	/ˈxoma/	'soil'
γόμα	/ˈɣoma/	'eraser'
γκάμα	/ˈᵑɡama/	'range'

The table below, adapted from Arvaniti (2007, p. 25), displays a near-full array of consonant phones in Standard Modern Greek.

Consonant phones
		Bilabial	Labio- dental	Dental	Alveolar		Retracted alveolar	Alveolo- palatal	Retracted palatal	Velar
		Bilabial	Labio- dental	Dental	plain	affr.	Retracted alveolar	Alveolo- palatal	Retracted palatal	Velar
Nasal		m	ɱ	n̪	n		n̠	ɲ̟		ŋ
Plosive/ Affricate	voiceless	p			t	ts			c̠	k
Plosive/ Affricate	prenasal	ᵐb			ⁿd	ⁿdz			ᶮɟ̠	ᵑɡ
Plosive/ Affricate	voiced	b			d	dz			ɟ̠	ɡ
Fricative	voiceless		f	θ			s̠		ç̠	x
Fricative	voiced		v	ð			z̠		ʝ̠	ɣ
Vibrant	tap						ɾ̠			
Vibrant	trill						r̠			
Approximant					l		ɹ̠	ʎ̟		

=== Sandhi ===
Some assimilatory processes mentioned above also occur across word boundaries. In particular, this goes for a number of grammatical words ending in /n/, most notably the negation particles δεν and μην and the accusative forms of the personal pronoun and definite article τον and την. If these words are followed by a voiceless stop, /n/ either assimilates for place of articulation to the stop, or is altogether deleted, and the stop - in both circumstances - becomes voiced. This results in pronunciations such as τον πατέρα [to(m)baˈtera] ('the father' ACC) or δεν πειράζει [ðe(m)biˈrazi] ('it doesn't matter'), instead of *[ton paˈtera] and *[ðen piˈrazi]. The precise extent of assimilation may vary according to dialect, speed and formality of speech. This may be compared with pervasive sandhi phenomena in Celtic languages, particularly nasalisation in Irish and in certain dialects of Scottish Gaelic.

== Vowels ==
The vowels of Standard Modern Greek on a vowel chart. Adapted from Arvaniti (2007, p. 28).

	Front	Central	Back
Close	i		u
Mid	e̞		o̞
Open		ɐ	

Greek has a system of five vowels /i, u, e, o, a/. The first two are close to the cardinal vowels [i, u]; the mid vowels /e, o/ are true-mid [e̞, o̞]; and the open /a/ is near-open central [ɐ].

There is no phonemic length distinction, but vowels in stressed syllables are pronounced somewhat longer [iˑ, uˑ, eˑ, oˑ, aˑ] than in unstressed syllables. Furthermore, vowels in stressed syllables are more peripheral, but the difference is not large. In casual speech, unstressed /i/ and /u/ in the vicinity of voiceless consonants may become devoiced or even elided.

Examples for vowel phonemes
πας	/pas/	'you go' subj.
πες	/pes/	'say' imper.
πεις	/pis/	'you say' subj.
πως	/pos/	'that' conj.
πού	/pu/	'where'

Some falling diphthongs exist as well, e.g. ακούει [aˈkui̯] 's/he listens', γάιδαρος [ˈɣai̯ðaɾos] 'donkey', φράουλα [ˈfɾau̯la] 'strawberry'.

== Stress ==
Unlike Ancient Greek, which had a pitch accent system, Modern Greek has variable (phonologically unpredictable) stress. Every multisyllabic word carries stress on one of its three final syllables. Enclitics form a single phonological word together with the host word to which they attach, and count towards the three-syllable rule. When an enclitic attaches to a word with stress on the third to last syllable, that stress becomes secondary, and the primary stress shifts to the second to last syllable (e.g. αυτοκίνητό μου [aftoˌciniˈto mu] 'my car'). Phonetically, stressed syllables are longer, or carry higher amplitude, or both.

The position of the stress can vary between different inflectional forms of the same word within its inflectional paradigm. In some paradigms, the stress is always on the third-last syllable, shifting its position in those forms that have longer affixes (e.g. κάλεσα 'I called' vs. καλέσαμε 'we called'; πρόβλημα 'problem' vs. προβλήματα 'problems'). In some word classes, stress position also preserves an older pattern inherited from Ancient Greek according to which a word could not be accented on the third-last syllable if the vowel in the last syllable was long, e.g. άνθρωπος ('human', nominative singular, last vowel short), but ανθρώπων ('of humans', genitive plural, last vowel long). However, in Modern Greek this rule is no longer automatic and does not apply to all words (e.g. καλόγερος 'monk', καλόγερων 'of monks'), as the phonological vowel length distinction itself no longer exists.

== Sample ==
This sample text, the first sentence of Aesop's fable "The North Wind and the Sun" in Greek, and the accompanying transcription, are adapted from Arvaniti (1999, pp. 5–6).

=== Orthographic version ===
Ο βοριάς κι ο ήλιος μάλωναν για το ποιος απ' τους δυο είναι ο δυνατότερος, όταν έτυχε να περάσει από μπροστά τους ένας ταξιδιώτης που φορούσε κάπα.

=== Transcription ===
[o voˈɾʝas ˈco̯iʎoz ˈmalonan | ʝa to ˈpços aptuz ˈðʝo ˈineo̯ ðinaˈtoteɾos | ˈota ˈnetiçe napeˈɾasi apo broˈstatus | ˈenas taksiˈðʝotis pu̥ foˈɾuse ˈkapa]

== Bibliography ==
- Arvaniti, Amalia (1999). "Standard Modern Greek". Journal of the International Phonetic Association. 29 (2): 167–172. JSTOR 44526244.
- Arvaniti, Amalia (2007). "Greek Phonetics: The State of the Art". Journal of Greek Linguistics. 8: 97–208. doi:10.1075/jgl.8.08arv. hdl:2066/221101. ISSN 1566-5844.
- Baltazani, Mary; Topinzi, Nina (2013). "Where the glide meets the palatals". Selected Papers of the 20th International Symposium of Theoretical and Applied Linguistics. Versita.
- Holton, David; Mackridge, Peter; Philippaki-Warburton, Irene (2016) [2004]. Greek: an essential grammar of the modern language (2 ed.). London and New York: Routledge. ISBN 978-1-315-68030-9. OCLC 946887585.
- Holton, David; Mackridge, Peter; Philippaki-Warburton, Irini (1998). Grammatiki tis ellinikis glossas Γραμματική της ελληνικής γλώσσας [Grammar of the Greek Language] (in Greek). Athens: Pataki. ISBN 960-378-082-0. OCLC 1074912202.
- Joseph, Brian; Philippaki-Warburton, Irene (1987). Modern Greek. Croom Helm descriptive grammars series. London: Routledge. ISBN 0-415-03685-2. OCLC 18960976.
- Zachariou, Philemon (8 June 2020). Reading and Pronouncing Biblical Greek: Historical Pronunciation versus Erasmian. Wipf and Stock Publishers. ISBN 978-1-7252-5448-0.
