= Rho =

Seventeenth letter of the Greek alphabet

Rho (/ˈroʊ/; uppercase Ρ, lowercase ρ or ϱ; Greek: ρο or ρω) is the seventeenth letter of the Greek alphabet. In the system of Greek numerals it has a value of 100. It is derived from the Phoenician letter resh. Its uppercase form uses the same glyph, Ρ, as the distinct Latin letter P; the two letters have different Unicode encodings.

== Uses ==
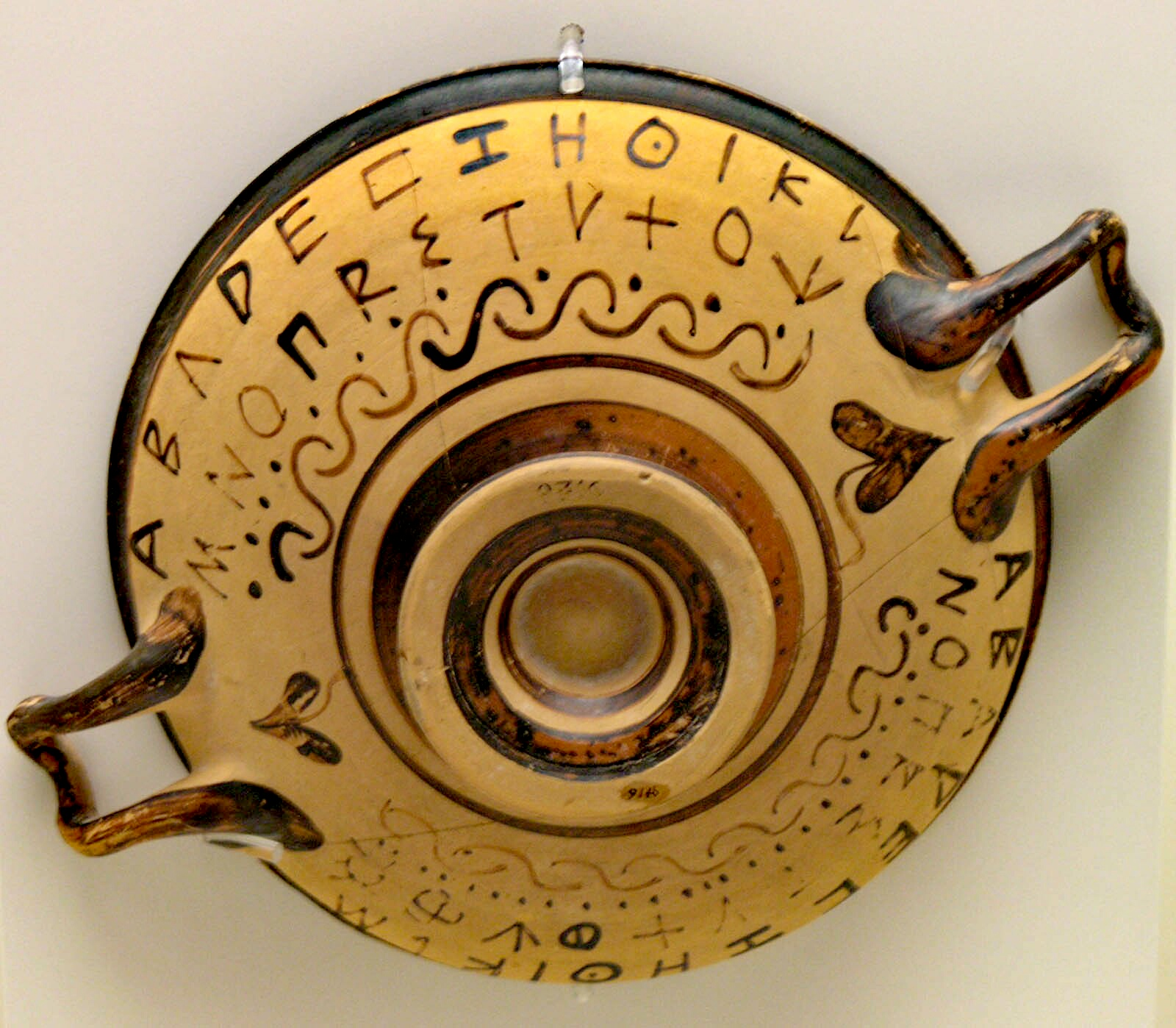
The Greek alphabet on a black figure vessel, with an R-shaped rho.

=== Greek ===
Rho is classed as a liquid consonant (together with Lambda and sometimes the nasals Mu and Nu), which has important implications for morphology. In both Ancient and Modern Greek, it represents an alveolar trill IPA: [r], alveolar tap IPA: [ɾ], or alveolar approximant IPA: [ɹ].

In polytonic orthography, a rho at the beginning of a word is almost always written ⟨ῥ⟩ (rh) with a rough breathing mark, indicating that it is voiceless. Very rarely, it is written ⟨ῤ⟩ (r) with a smooth breathing mark, indicating that it is voiced, instead. Rho is not written with breathing marks at any other place in a word, where it is always voiced, with the exception of double rho, which was traditionally written ⟨ῤῥ⟩ (rrh), with a smooth breathing mark over the first rho, and a rough breathing mark over the second, representing a geminated voiceless consonant. However, this practice fell out of use over the 19th century in favour of ⟨ρρ⟩, since double rho cannot take any other combination of breathing marks. Various Greek-derived English words containing rh and rrh derive from words containing ⟨ῤ⟩ and ⟨ρρ⟩.

The name of the letter is written in Greek as ῥῶ (polytonic) or ρω/ρο (monotonic).

=== Other alphabets ===
Letters that arose from rho include Roman R and Cyrillic Er (Р).

=== Mathematics and science ===
The characters ρ and ϱ are also conventionally used outside the Greek alphabetical context in science and mathematics.

- In the physical sciences to represent:
  - Densities: mass density, air density or charge density (ρ)
  - Resistivity (ρ)
  - Rho meson (ρ^{+}, ρ^{−}, ρ^{0})
  - General quantum states
  - Hammett Equation, ρ is used to represent the reaction constant, this is independent of the position and nature of the substituents of the benzene ring.
  - Correlation coefficient in meteorology (ρ_{hv})
- In mathematics to represent:
  - A length coordinate in polar, cylindrical, spherical, and toroidal coordinate systems, and toroidal and poloidal coordinates of the Earth's magnetic field.
  - The correlation coefficient of a population parameter
  - The spectral radius of a matrix $A$ denoted as $\rho(A)$
  - The plastic ratio
  - The prime constant
  - The sensitivity to interest rates of a pricing function
  - The expected return of a given policy ($\pi$) in reinforcement learning, denoted $\rho^\pi$
  - The rename operation in relational algebra
- In molecular biology to represent the Rho protein responsible for termination of RNA synthesis. In such occasions, it is often represented as U+03F1 ϱ GREEK RHO SYMBOL, to avoid confusion with the Latin letter p
- In molecular biology to represent the Rho family of GTPases, important for cytoskeletal dynamic regulation.
- In ecology to represent the population damping ratio where ρ = λ1 / |λ2|.
- In computer programming
  - The lower-case rho "⍴" means reshape in the APL programming language, and by extension also queries shape
  - The lower-case rho "ρ" is used for the unary rename operation in relational algebra
- In statistics to represent Spearman's rank correlation coefficient, commonly known as Spearman's rho
- In options theory to represent the rate of change of a portfolio with respect to interest rates

=== Chi Rho (☧) ===
The Chi Rho symbol representing Christ.

The letter rho overlaid with chi forms the Chi Rho symbol, used to represent Jesus Christ. It was first used by Emperor Constantine the Great. An example of this can be seen on his standard known as the Labarum.

=== Rho with stroke (ϼ) ===
The rho with a stroke through its tail is used for abbreviations involving rho, most notably in γϼ for γράμμα as a unit of measurement.

== Unicode ==
- U+03A1 Ρ GREEK CAPITAL LETTER RHO (&Rho;)
- U+03C1 ρ GREEK SMALL LETTER RHO (&rho;)
- U+03F1 ϱ GREEK RHO SYMBOL (&rhov;, &varrho;)
- U+03FC ϼ GREEK RHO WITH STROKE SYMBOL
- U+1D29 ᴩ GREEK LETTER SMALL CAPITAL RHO
- U+1D68 ᵨ GREEK SUBSCRIPT SMALL LETTER RHO
- U+1FE4 ῤ GREEK SMALL LETTER RHO WITH PSILI
- U+1FE5 ῥ GREEK SMALL LETTER RHO WITH DASIA
- U+1FEC Ῥ GREEK CAPITAL LETTER RHO WITH DASIA
- U+2374 ⍴ APL FUNCTIONAL SYMBOL RHO
- U+2627 ☧ CHI RHO
- U+2CA2 Ⲣ COPTIC CAPITAL LETTER RO
- U+2CA3 ⲣ COPTIC SMALL LETTER RO
- U+2CE5 ⳥ COPTIC SYMBOL MI RO
- U+2CE6 ⳦ COPTIC SYMBOL PI RO
- U+2CE8 ⳨ COPTIC SYMBOL TAU RO
- U+2CE9 ⳩ COPTIC SYMBOL KHI RO
- U+101A0 𐆠 GREEK SYMBOL TAU RHO

These characters are used only as mathematical symbols. Stylized Greek text should be encoded using the normal Greek letters, with markup and formatting to indicate text style:

- U+1D6B8 𝚸 MATHEMATICAL BOLD CAPITAL RHO
- U+1D6D2 𝛒 MATHEMATICAL BOLD SMALL RHO
- U+1D6E0 𝛠 MATHEMATICAL BOLD RHO SYMBOL
- U+1D6F2 𝛲 MATHEMATICAL ITALIC CAPITAL RHO
- U+1D70C 𝜌 MATHEMATICAL ITALIC SMALL RHO
- U+1D71A 𝜚 MATHEMATICAL ITALIC RHO SYMBOL
- U+1D72C 𝜬 MATHEMATICAL BOLD ITALIC CAPITAL RHO
- U+1D746 𝝆 MATHEMATICAL BOLD ITALIC SMALL RHO
- U+1D754 𝝔 MATHEMATICAL BOLD ITALIC RHO SYMBOL
- U+1D766 𝝦 MATHEMATICAL SANS-SERIF BOLD CAPITAL RHO
- U+1D780 𝞀 MATHEMATICAL SANS-SERIF BOLD SMALL RHO
- U+1D78E 𝞎 MATHEMATICAL SANS-SERIF BOLD RHO SYMBOL
- U+1D7A0 𝞠 MATHEMATICAL SANS-SERIF BOLD ITALIC CAPITAL RHO
- U+1D7BA 𝞺 MATHEMATICAL SANS-SERIF BOLD ITALIC SMALL RHO
- U+1D7C8 𝟈 MATHEMATICAL SANS-SERIF BOLD ITALIC RHO SYMBOL

== See also ==
- Р, р - Er (Cyrillic)
- R, r - Latin
- P, p - Latin
