= Dictionnaire de l'Académie française =

French language dictionary

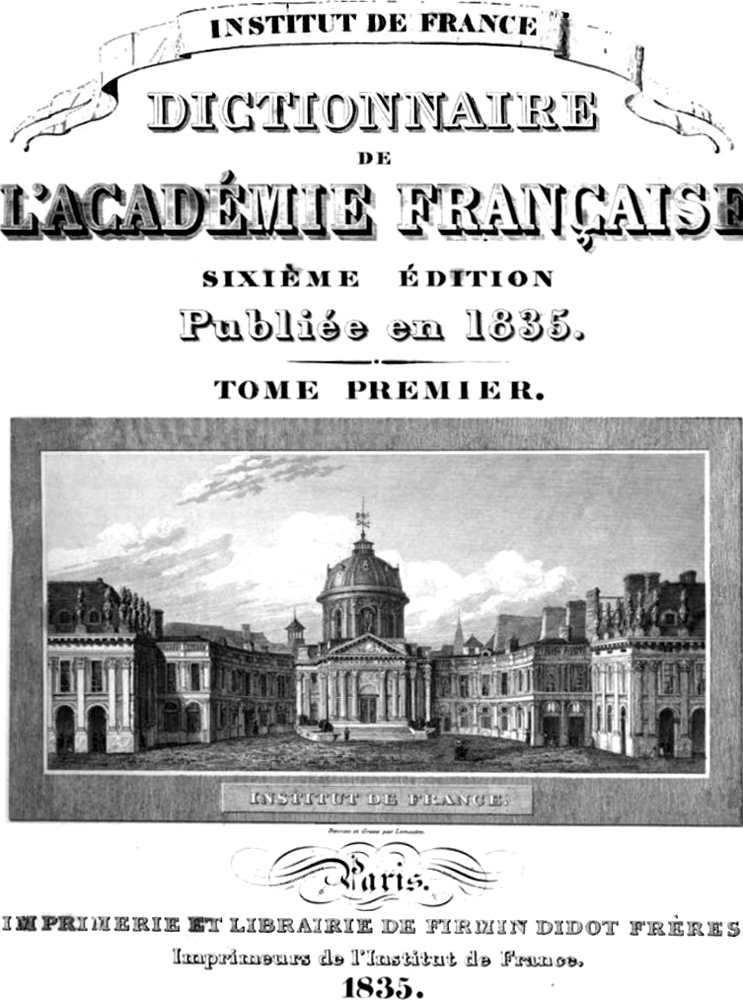
Title page of the 6th edition of the Académie's dictionary (1835)

The Dictionnaire de l'Académie française (French pronunciation: [diksjɔnɛːʁ də lakademi fʁɑ̃sɛːz]; English: Dictionary of the French academy) is a French language dictionary published by the Académie française.

The Académie française is an institution tasked with establishing rules for the use of the French language, the compilation of a dictionary being one of its primary tasks. Although it makes recommendations for the correct use of French, they carry no legal power, and are frequently disregarded, including by government authorities. The ninth edition was completed in November 2024, and is available online in its entirety along with all previous editions.

== Publication ==
A special Commission (Commission du dictionnaire) composed of several (but not all) of the members of the Académie undertakes the compilation of the dictionary. It has published thirteen editions of the dictionary, of which three were preliminary, eight were complete, and two were supplements for specialised words. The completed edition of the Dictionnaire de l'Académie française, the first official dictionary of the French language, was presented upon completion by the Académie to King Louis XIV. on 24 August 1694.

Preliminary editions:

- Le Dictionnaire de l'Académie françoise (from A to Aversion), pre-edition, Frankfurt am Main, 1687
- Le Dictionnaire de l'Académie françoise (from A to Confiture), pre-edition, Frankfurt am Main, 1687
- Le Dictionnaire de l'Académie françoise (from A to Neuf), pre-edition, Paris, 1687

Vocabulaire de la langue française; par MM. Nodier et Ackermann, Paris, 1868

Complete editions:

- Le Dictionnaire de l'Académie françoise dedié au Roy (1st edition), Paris, 1694
- Nouveau Dictionnaire de l'Académie françoise dedié au Roy (2nd edition), Paris, 1718
- Le Dictionnaire de l'Académie françoise (3rd edition), Paris, 1740
- Le Dictionnaire de l'Académie françoise (4th edition), Paris, 1762
- Le Dictionnaire de l'Académie françoise (5th edition), Paris, 1798
- Dictionnaire de l'Académie française (6th edition), Paris, 1835
- Dictionnaire de l'Académie française (7th edition), Paris, 1879
- Dictionnaire de l'Académie française (8th edition), Paris, 1932–1935
- Dictionnaire de l'Académie française (9th edition), Paris, 1992-2024

Supplementary editions for the sciences, arts, and technology:

- Corneille, Thomas, Le Dictionnaire des Arts et des Sciences, Paris, 1694
- Barré, Louis, Complément du Dictionnaire de l'Académie française, Paris, 1842

In 1778, the Académie attempted to compile a "historical dictionary" of the French language. The project was later abandoned, having failed to progress beyond the letter "A".

Work on the ninth edition started in 1986, and was concluded in 2024 by the publication of its last volume. It was published in four volumes starting in 1992:

- 1st volume (A to Enzyme), 1992 (ISBN 978-2-11081-249-0)
- 2nd volume (Éocène to Mappemonde), 2000 (ISBN 978-2-21362-143-2)
- 3rd volume (Maquereau to Quotité), 2011 (ISBN 978-2-21366-640-2)
- 4th volume (R to Zzz), 2024 (ISBN 978-2-213-72741-7)

The completed ninth edition was presented by the Académie Française to French president Emmanuel Macron on 14 November 2024. With almost 53,000 words, it contains 21,000 new words compared to the 8th edition. Given that, by the time all volumes were completed, the first volume was already 32 years old and thus long out of date, the Académie published addenda of 189 words which had not been added to their respective volumes at the time of their publication.

In part due to the unusually slow publication cycle of the Dictionnaire de l'Académie Française, other dictionaries (such as those published by Larousse and Le Robert) are more commonly used as everyday reference sources. They are also more comprehensive, with the Grand Robert counting 350,000 words.

== Encoding ==
The IETF language tags have registered fr-1694acad for Early Modern French, "17th century French, as catalogued in the "Dictionnaire de l'académie françoise", 4eme ed. 1694; frequently includes elements of Middle French, as this is a transitional period".

== See also ==
- Language policy in France
- Reforms of French orthography
