= Josette Rey-Debove =

French lexicographer (1929–2005)

- Born: 16 November 1929; Calais, France
- Died: 22 February 2005 (aged 75); Senegal

Josette Rey-Debove (November 16, 1929 – February 22, 2005), was a French lexicographer and semiologist. She was the first female lexicographer in France, and held many prominent posts in this field, where she used her influence to promote feminist changes to French language usage. Her husband, Alain Rey, was also her colleague.

== Early life and education ==
Josette Rey-Debove was born November 16, 1929, in Calais (Pas-de-Calais), France. She was a graduate of the University of Sorbonne, with a doctorate of linguistics.

== Career ==
She began her career in 1952 as a lecturer of French at the Edgar-Quinet College in Paris. The following year, she became an editor of language dictionaries at the Société du Nouveau Littré (later Dictionnaires Le Robert), one of the most prominent publishers of dictionaries in the French language. It was there that she met Alain Rey, whom she married on September 11, 1954.

She contributed to dictionaries for Dictionnaires Le Robert, collaborating on the Petit Robert for the French language, at Robert des Enfants (the company's division for publishing the children's dictionaries), to the Dictionnaire du français (foreign language edition) and to Robert Méthodique-Brio. In 1977, she became secretary-general of Dictionnaires Le Robert, a position she held until 1994.

A well-known linguist who promoted feminist changes to French usage, she was named to various commissions to develop the standards of the language: the Commission de la féminisation du vocabulaire au ministère des droits de la femme between 1984 and 1985, the Commission d'expertise pour la réforme de l'orthographe au Conseil supérieur de la langue française in 1989, the Commission d'orientation pour la simplification du langage administratif au ministère de la Fonction publique et de la Réforme de l'État in 2001, the Office québécois de la langue française sur la terminologie, la néologie et la méthodologie du travail terminologique during the 1970s.

She was also a professor of lexicology and semiology at the University Paris III-Sorbonne Nouvelle throughout the 1970s, subsequently at the University Paris VII-Denis Diderot during the 1980s, and at the École des hautes études en sciences sociales beginning in 2002. A friend of many of the members of Oulipo (Bernard Cerquiglini, Paul Fournel), she was their visiting scholar in 1986.

She died February 22, 2005, in Senegal.

== Awards ==
- Ordre national du Québec (National Order of Quebec) in 2004
- Chevalier (Knight) of the Ordre national du Mérite (National Order of Merit) of France.

== Works ==
- Le Petit Robert, in collaboration, 1967
- Étude linguistique et sémiotique des dictionnaires français contemporains, Mouton De Gruyter, 1971 (ISBN 9789027916396)
- Recherche sur les systèmes signifiants, 1973
- Le Métalangage : étude du discours sur le langage, Armand Colin, 1978 (ISBN 978-0004334967), and the second edition in 1997, revised in 2007 (ISBN 9782200017903).
- Lexique de sémiotique, 1979
- Dictionnaire méthodique du français actuel, 1982, revised in 2003
- Le Petit Robert des enfants, 1988
- Dictionnaire des anglicismes, with Gilberte Gagnon, Le Robert, 1991. (ISBN 9782850360343)
- Le Nouveau Petit Robert, in collaboration, 1993, revised in 2006 (ISBN 9782849021330)
- Le Robert quotidien, 1996
- La Linguistique du signe : une approche sémiotique du langage et le Robert du français, 1998
