= Bernard Cerquiglini =

French linguist

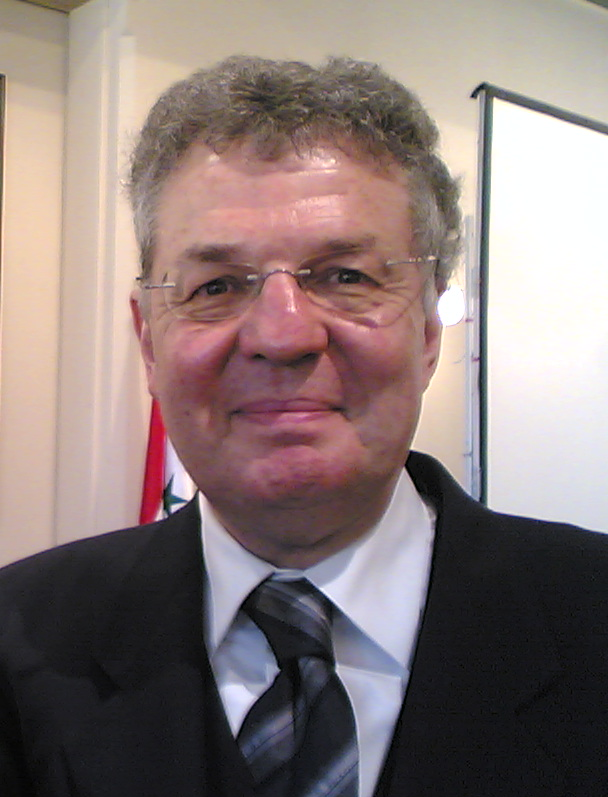

Rector of the Agence universitaire de la Francophonie
- In office 2007–2015
- Preceded by: Michèle Gendreau-Massaloux
- Succeeded by: Jean-Paul de Gaudemar

President of Observatoire national de la lecture
- In office 2001–2004
- Preceded by: Jacques Friedel
- Succeeded by: Erik Orsenna

General Delegation for the French language and the languages of France
- In office 2001–2004
- Preceded by: Anne Magnant
- Succeeded by: Xavier North

Personal details
- Born: 8 April 1947 (age 79) Lyon, France
- Education: École normale supérieure de Fontenay-Saint-Cloud
- Profession: Linguist
- Awards: Commandeur des Arts et des Lettres (1993), Prix Georges-Dumézil (1997), Officier de la Légion d'honneur (2013)

Bernard Cerquiglini
- Board member of: Oulipo, Royal Academy of Science, Letters and Fine Arts of Belgium

Academic background
- Doctoral advisor: Jean Stéfanini

Bernard Cerquiglini (born 8 April 1947 in Lyon, France), is a French linguist.

A Graduate of the École normale supérieure de Saint-Cloud, having received an agrégé and a doctorate in letters, he was a teacher of linguistics in University of Paris VII, former director of the National Institute for the French language, former vice-president of the Conseil supérieur de la langue française and president of the French National Reading Observatory. In 1995 Bernard Cerquiglini joined the Oulipo. He was in charge of a governmental studies on a French orthography reform and about national languages in France. He received the title Doctor Honoris Causa at ULIM.

== Biography ==
Bernard Cerquiglini is, through his paternal lineage, of Italian heritage from the region of Umbria (Perugia). He notably served as the director of schooling (in other words, primary education) at the French Ministry of Education (1985–1987), as director of the Institut national de la langue française, as vice president of Conseil supérieur de la langue française, as a member of General Delegation for the French language and the languages of France (for two terms), as president of Observatoire national de la lecture. He was tasked with reforms of French orthography, then to report on the languages of France by different French Prime Ministers, as well as the feminization of trade names.

Bernard Cequiglini joined Oulipo in 1995 He authored an "utobiographie de l'accent circonflexe" (Autobiography of the Circumflexa), under the title "L'Accent du souvenir" (the accent of memory), in it he played the role of "gardien de la langue" (guardian of the language) to defend its evolution and on certain occasions its simplification.

Cerquiglini's Eloge de la variante (Paris:Seuil, 1989; trans. in 1999 into English, In Praise of the Variant, 1999), marks the beginning of the scholarly paradigm referred to as "the New Medievalism" (also: the New Philology), which was critical of modernist positivist editorial practices for medieval texts. However, his claim that "[p]hilology is a bourgeois, paternalist, and hygienist system of thought about the family; it cherishes filiation, tracks down adulterers, and is afraid of contamination. Its thought is based on what is wrong (the variant being a form of deviant behaviour), and it is the basis for a positive methodology", was criticised by the Indologist Reinhold Grünendahl, who argued that the aim of Cerquiglini's work is not to contribute to a methodological debate but to confirm the premise of critical theory.

After his tenure as director of the Center for French and Francophone Studies at Louisiana State University in Baton Rouge, he became rector of the Agence universitaire de la Francophonie from 2007 to 2015. Since May 2020, Cerquiglini has been vice president of the Alliance française foundation.

He also presents a weekly short format program on TV5Monde about linguistics called Merci professeur !

== Distinctions ==
- Docteur honoris causa from the University of Bucharest, from the University of Budapest, from the Sichuan University of International Studies (Chongqing), from the University of Ouagadougou, and from the University of Assane Seck Ziguinchor
- Officer of the Légion d'honneur. He was knighted 31 December 1993.
- Commander of the Ordre des Palmes académiques
- Commander of the Ordre des Arts et des Lettres promoted on 2 August 1993.

== Bibliography ==
- 1979 : " La Représentation du discours dans les textes narratifs du Moyen Âge français ", thèse d'État de linguistique, Aix-Marseille I, 783 p.
- 1981 : La Parole médiévale : Discours, syntaxe, texte, Les Éditions de Minuit, coll. " Propositions " (n^{o} 3), 252 p. (ISBN 2-7073-0592-8).
- 1989 : Éloge de la variante : Histoire critique de la philologie, Seuil, coll. " Des travaux " (n^{o} 8), 122 p. (ISBN 2-02-010433-4).
- 1991 : La Naissance du français, Presses universitaires de France, " Que sais-je ? " (n^{o} 2576), 127 p. (ISBN 2-13-043559-9), 2^{e} éd. 1993 (ISBN 2-13-044825-9), 3^{e} éd. 2007 (ISBN 978-2-13-056433-1).
- 1995 : L’Accent du souvenir, Les Éditions de Minuit, coll. " Paradoxe ", 165 p. (ISBN 2-7073-1536-2). Prix Georges-Dumézil de l’Académie française 1997
- 1996 : Le Roman de l’orthographe : Au paradis des mots, avant la faute, 1150–1694, Hatier, coll. " Brèves littérature ", 167 p. (ISBN 2-7438-0077-1)
- 1997 : À travers le Jabberwocky de Lewis Carroll : Onze mots-valises dans huit traductions, préface d'Hervé Le Tellier, Le Castor astral, coll. " L'Iutile ", 44 p. (ISBN 2-85920-307-9); repris dans La Chasse au Snark [The Hunting of the Snark: An Agony in Eight Fits], trad. Jacques Roubaud et Mériam Korichi, ill. Henry Holiday, Gallimard, coll. " Folio " (n^{o} 5045), 132 p. (ISBN 978-2-07-043668-2).
- 1999 : " Les Langues de la France ", rapport au ministre de l'Éducation nationale, de la Recherche et de la Technologie.
- 2004 : La Genèse de l'orthographe française : xii^{e} – xvii^{e} siècles, H. Champion, coll. " Unichamp-essentiel " (n^{o} 15), 180 p. (ISBN 2-7453-0891-2).
- 2007 : Une langue orpheline, Les Éditions de Minuit, coll. " Paradoxe ", 228 p. (ISBN 978-2-7073-1981-4).
- 2008 : Merci professeur ! : Chroniques savoureuses sur la langue française, Bayard, 328 p. (ISBN 978-2-227-47709-4)
- 2008 : Les Saillies du dragon, Oulipo, coll. " La Bibliothèque oulipienne " (n^{o} 166), 18 p.
- 2012 : Petites Chroniques du français comme on l'aime, Larousse, 352 p. (ISBN 978-2-03-588587-6)
- 2013 : Une année bien remplie, Oulipo, coll. " La Bibliothèque oulipienne " (n^{o} 198), 31 p.
- 2016 : L’Orthographe rectifiée. Le guide pour tout comprendre. Librio + Le Monde, 95 p. (ISBN 978-2-290-13348-4)
- 2016 : Enrichissez-vous : parlez francophone ! Trésor des expressions et mots savoureux de la francophonie. Larousse, 175 p. (ISBN 978-2-03-592903-7)
- 2018 : L'Invention de Nithard, Les Éditions de Minuit, 128 p. (ISBN 978-2-7073-4469-4)
- 2018 :, Points, 2019 (1^{re} éd. 2018), 208 p. (ISBN 978-2-7578-8004-3)
- 2019 : Parlez-vous tronqué ? Portrait du français d'aujourd'hui, éditions Larousse, 172 p. (ISBN 978-2-03-595781-8)
- 2024 : "La langue anglaise n'existe pas". C'est du français mal prononcé, Éditions Gallimard, 196 p. (ISBN 978-2-0730-5661-0)

=== Collected works ===
- 1984 : Histoire de la littérature française, avec Jacqueline Cerquiglini, Fernand Égéa, Bernard Lecherbonnier, Bernard Lehembre, et Jean-Jacques Mougenot, Nathan, coll. "Beaux livres ", 239 p. (ISBN 2-09-297611-7).
- 1999 : Femme, j'écris ton nom… : Guide d'aide à la féminisation des noms de métiers, titres, grades et fonctions, préface de Lionel Jospin, en collaboration avec Annie Béquer, Nicole Cholewka, Martine Coutier, Josette Frécher et Marie-Josèphe Mathieu, INALF/CNRS Éditions, La Documentation française, 124 p. (ISBN 2-11-004274-5).
- 2000 : Histoire de la langue française : 1945–2000, avec Gérald Antoine, CNRS Éditions, 1028 p. (ISBN 2-271-05762-0).
- 2000 : Tu parles !? Le Français dans tous ses états, avec Jean-Claude Corbeil, Jean-Marie Klinkenberg et Benoît Peeters, Flammarion.

=== Critical Edition ===
- 1981 : Le Roman du Graal, par Robert de Boron, d'après le manuscrit de Modène, 10/18 (No. 1412), série " Bibliothèque médiévale ", 307 p. ISBN 2-264-00336-7.

=== Translation ===
- 1975 : Questions de sémantique [Studies on semantics in generative grammar], par Noam Chomsky, Seuil, " L'ordre philosophique " (No. 22), 230 p. ISBN 2-02-002748-8.

=== Prefaces ===
- 2002 : Le Dictionnaire des mots et expressions de couleur du XXième siècle : le rose, par Annie Mollard-Desfour, CNRS Éditions, " CNRS Dictionnaires ", 287 p. ISBN 2-271-05993-3.
- 2010 : Dictionnaire des écrivains francophones classiques : Afrique subsaharienne, Caraïbe, Maghreb, Machrek, océan Indien, par Christiane Chaulet Achour, avec Corinne Blanchaud, avant-propos de Jean-Marc Moura, H. Champion, " Champion les dictionnaires ", 472 p. ISBN 978-2-7453-2126-8
