= 1990 spelling reform =

1990 spelling reform may refer to:

- The Rectifications of 1990, a reform from the Académie française
- Portuguese Language Orthographic Agreement of 1990, an international treaty on Portuguese that included spelling reform
