= Language commissioner =

Language commissioner or language ombudsman may refer to:

- An Coimisinéir Teanga, in Ireland
- Dzongkha Development Commission, in Bhutan
- Language ombudsman (Ukraine)
- Office of the Commissioner of Official Languages, in Canada
- Office québécois de la langue française, in Canada
- Welsh Language Commissioner, in Wales

== See also ==
- Language police (disambiguation)
- Superior Council of the French Language (disambiguation)
- David Bazay (1939–2005), sometime CBC English language ombudsman
