= Korvin =

Korvin, an alternative of Corvin from the Latin name Corvinus is a surname and may refer to:

- Charles Korvin (1907–1998), American actor
- Eddie Korvin (born 1945), American recording engineer, composer and music producer
- Mickael Korvin (born 1957), Franco-American author and translator, creator of "nouvofrancet", a simplified method of learning French
- Ottó Korvin (1894–1919), Hungarian communist politician

== Compound surnames ==
- Anna Korvin-Krukovskaya (1843–1887), birth name of Anne Jaclard, Russian socialist and feminist revolutionary
- Vladimir Korvin-Piotrovskii (1891–1966), Russian emigre poet
- Zoia Korvin-Krukovsky (1903–1999), Russian-Swedish artist
