= Superior Council of the French Language =

Superior Council of the French Language (French: Conseil supérieur de la langue française) may refer to:

- Superior Council of the French Language (Belgium), an advisory body on French-language policy in the French Community of Belgium
- Superior Council of the French Language (France), a former French government advisory body on French-language policy
- Superior Council of the French Language (Quebec), an advisory body on French-language policy in Quebec, Canada

== See also ==
- Académie Française, the principal French learned society concerned with matters relating to the French language
- Conseil (disambiguation)
