= General Delegation for the French language and the languages of France =

Coordinates: 48.8651°N 2.3331°E

General Delegation for the French language and the languages of France (French: Délégation générale à la langue française et aux langues de France, DGLFLF) is, in France, a unit of the Ministry of Culture and Communication. Its mission is to lead, at the interdepartmental level, the language policy of France, concerning both the French and regional languages.

== History ==
Created in 1989 under the name "General Delegation for the French language" (DGLF), it became in 2001 the "General Delegation for the French language and the languages of France" to take into account regional languages.

It was the successor of the "Commissioner General to the French language" (aka "High Commissioner to the French language"), created in 1984 to replace the "High Committee for defense and expansion of the French language", itself created in 1966 by General Charles de Gaulle and renamed "High Committee of the French language" in 1973.

== Missions ==
The DGLFLF ensures compliance with the Act of August 4, 1994 in France, called the Toubon law and, in particular, the implementing decree of 1996 to enrich the French language and its provisions on the use of language. It coordinates with the General Commission of Terminology and Neologisms the development of terminology lists by the specialized committees of terminology and the French Academy. Specifically, it participated in the implementation of "FranceTerme", a terminological dictionary available to the general public on the internet.

It participates in programs teaching French to migrants. It supports the use of regional languages in the media and entertainment.

Until 2005, it assisted the secretariat of the Supreme Council of the French language.

It organizes an annual "Week of the French language and French speakers" in March.

Under the departmental plan for overseas, the General Delegation of the French language and the languages of France / Ministry of Culture and Communication, held in Cayenne, French Guiana, from 14 to 18 December 2011, the congress of multilingualism overseas (EGM-OM). The event brought together some 250 participants from throughout the French overseas territories and overseas metropolitan France and neighboring countries with the objective to make general recommendations for the implementation of a policy for languages overseas. The DGLFLF chose to draft acts of EGM-OM on Wikibooks.

== List of delegates general ==
General delegates to the French language, then to the French language and the languages of France, were successively:

- 1989: Bernard Cerquiglini
- 1993: Anne Magnant
- 2001: Bernard Cerquiglini
- 2004: Xavier North
- 2015: Loïc Depecker
- 2018: Paul de Sinety
