= Conseil =

Conseil may refer to:

== Government ==
- Conseil d'État (disambiguation), various governments or governmental organizations
- Conseil des Etats, the smaller chamber of the Federal Assembly of Switzerland
- Conseil de l'Entente, a West African regional co-operation forum
- Conseil du Roi, the administrative and governmental apparatus around the king of France during the Ancien Régime
- Conseil régional, the elected assembly of a region of France
- Conseil scolaire Centre-Nord, a French language school board in Alberta, Canada

== Other uses ==
- Conseil Hill, a hill on Pourquoi Pas island, Antarctica
- Conseil, a character in the 1870 Jules Verne novel Twenty Thousand Leagues Under the Seas

== See also ==
- Advice (disambiguation)
- Council (disambiguation)
