= Language police =

Language police may refer to:

- The Language Police, a book by Diane Ravitch
- Office québécois de la langue française, a government office also known as the "Quebec language police"
- Language commissioner (disambiguation)

== See also ==
- List of language regulators
- Linguistic prescription
- Linguistic purism
- Political correctness
