= Petit Robert =

Single-volume French dictionary

Le Petit Robert de la Langue Française
- Author: Paul Robert; Josette Rey-Debove; Alain Rey
- Original title: Le Petit Robert
- Language: French
- Genre: Reference
- Publisher: Dictionnaires Le Robert
- Publication date: 1967
- Publication place: France
- English publication date: 2000
- Pages: 2841
- ISBN: 2-85036-668-4
- OCLC: 45079389

Le Petit Robert de la Langue Française (IPA: [lə p(ə)ti ʁɔbɛʁ də la lɑ̃ɡ fʁɑ̃sɛːz]), known as just Petit Robert, is a popular single-volume French dictionary first published by Paul Robert in 1967. It is an abridgement of his eight-volume Dictionnaire alphabétique et analogique de la langue française.

As of 2008, it is in its fourth edition and is available in both print and electronic forms. It is also widely used across European nations. It is published by Dictionnaires Le Robert.
