= Alain Rey =

French lexicographer (1928–2020)

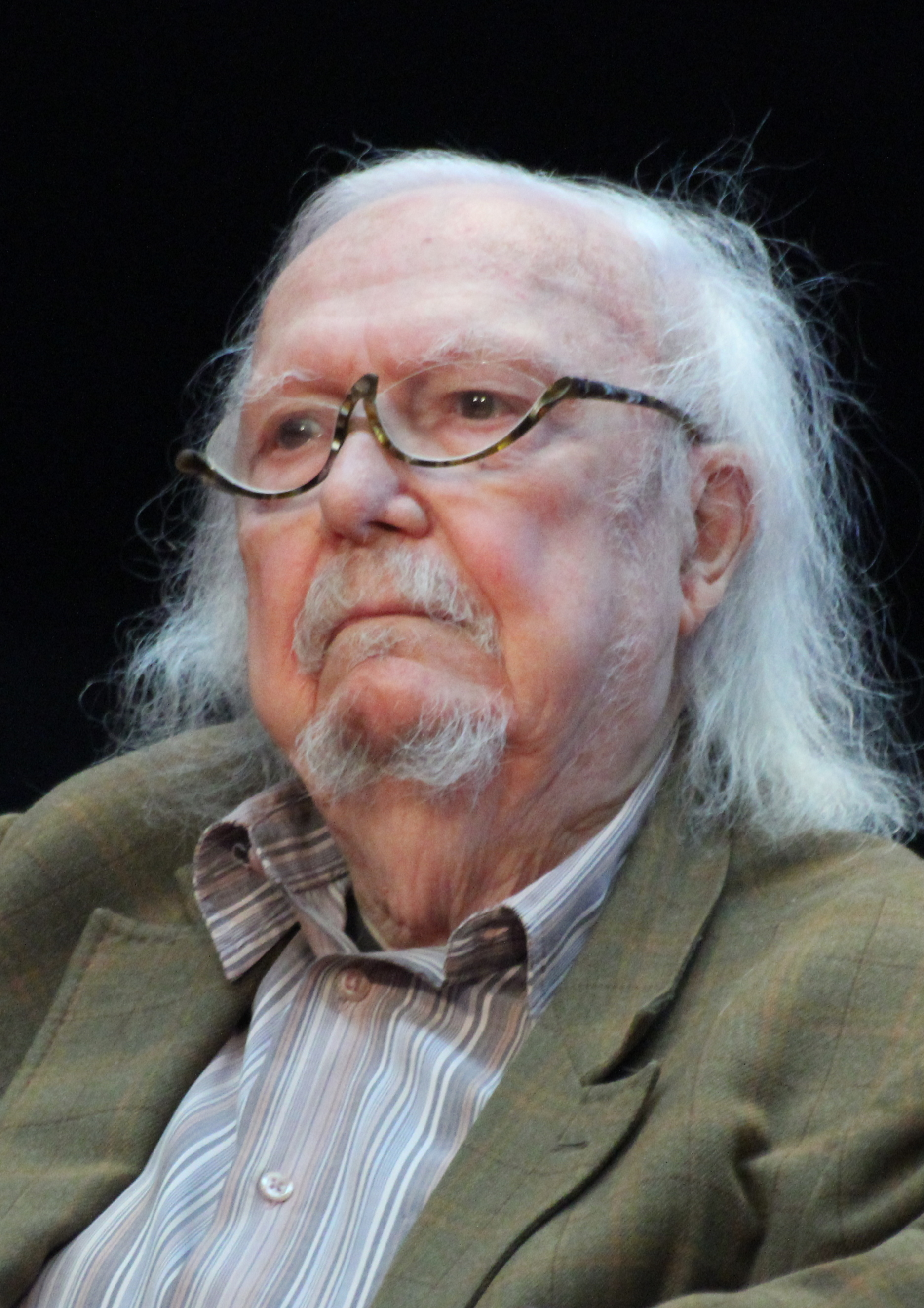
- Born: 30 August 1928; Pont-du-Château, France
- Died: 28 October 2020 (aged 92); Paris, France
- Education: University of Paris
- Occupation: Linguist

Alain Rey (French: [a.lɛ̃ ʁɛ]; 30 August 1928 – 28 October 2020) was a French linguist, lexicographer and radio personality. He was the editor-in-chief at French dictionary publisher Dictionnaires Le Robert. His wife, Josette Rey-Debove, was also his colleague.

== Biography ==
Rey was born in Pont-du-Château (Puy-de-Dôme) on 30 August 1928. After studying political science, humanities and art history at the Sorbonne, Rey served in the 4th Regiment of the Tunisian Troops. While stationed in Algeria in 1952, he replied to an advertisement placed by Paul Robert, who was compiling a new French dictionary and looking for linguists. Rey become Robert's first collaborator, on Dictionnaire alphabétique et analogique. Robert's network of lexicographers grew and Rey married his colleague Josette Debove in 1954. In 1964 the very first Le Robert dictionary was published, followed by an abridged Le Petit Robert in 1967.

Rey went on to supervise the publication of many more dictionaries under the Le Robert trademark: the Petit Robert (1967); the Micro Robert, a pocket dictionary; the Petit Robert des noms propres (1974), a guide to proper names; the Dictionnaire des expressions et locutions (1979), a dictionary of phrases and expressions; the Grand Robert de la langue française, a nine-volume work (1985); an updated version, the Nouveau Petit Robert de la langue française (1993), and the Dictionnaire historique de la langue française (1992). On 20 October 2016 a new and expanded edition of the Dictionnaire historique was published in two volumes.

In 2005, he published the Dictionnaire culturel en langue française.

Beyond the printed page, Rey enjoyed the status of a French media personality. Between 1993 and 2006, he appeared daily on France Inter's morning radio show, Sept neuf trente, in a three-minute closing segment called Le mot de la fin ("The Last Word"), in which he presented an entertaining analysis of French vocabulary. Rey often garnished these segments with political commentary of a libertarian stripe. Rey's segment was retired in 2006 — a move that for some signalled France Inter's desire for new blood to capture a younger demographic. His last segment with France Inter, broadcast on 29 June 2006, examined the word salut ("goodbye").

Between 2004 and 2005, Rey also appeared after the 8 o'clock evening news on the channel France 2, in a segment entitled Démo des Mots, in which he explained the history of French financial jargon.

In 2005, the French Minister of Culture and Communication awarded him the title of Commander in the French Ordre des Arts et des Lettres (Order of Arts and Literature).

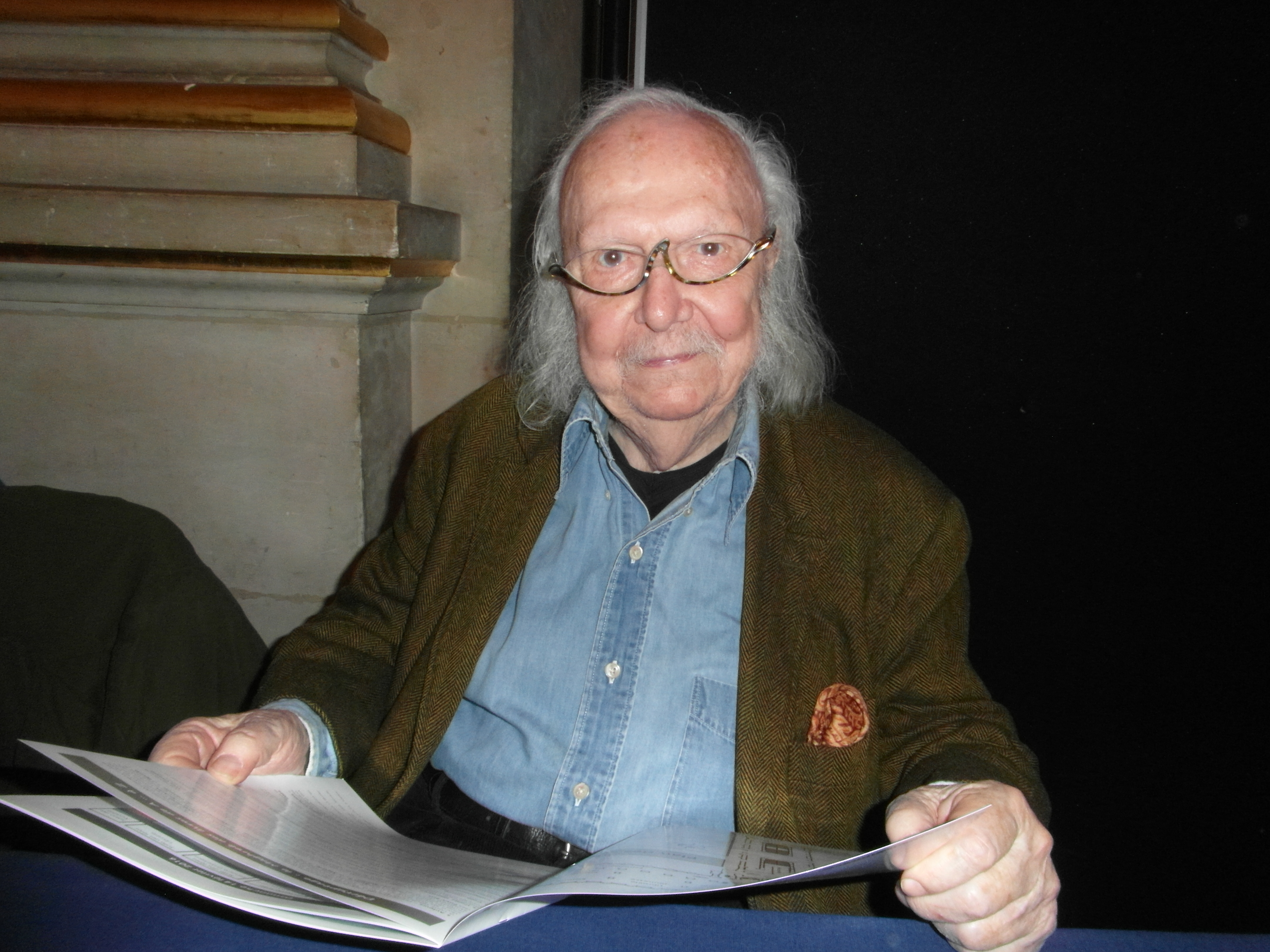
Alain Rey in 2016

Rey was also a signatory of the Appel à la vigilance contre le néocréationnisme et les intrusions spiritualistes en science ("Call to vigilance against creationism and religious interference with science"), published in France in December 2005.

Since September 2007, Rey had appeared on Laurent Baffie's Sunday morning radio show on Europe 1.

Rey died in October 2020, aged 92.

== Internet celebrity ==
On 14 July 2017 French YouTuber Squeezie made a song with two popular rappers called Bigflo & Oli. To get the words for the song they randomly selected words from a dictionary that was directed by Rey. They made a joke about how people direct dictionaries and Rey became a running joke. On 29 September 2017 Squeezie made another song with Bigflo & Oli, this time they invited Rey himself to choose their words, and they chose words for him to rap.

== Bibliography ==
- Littré, l’humaniste et les mots, 1970
- La Lexicologie : Lectures, 1970
- Théories du signe et du sens, volume 1 (1973) and 2 (1976)
- Le Lexique : Images et modèles, 1977
- Les Spectres de la bande, essai sur la BD, 1978
- Noms et notions : la terminologie, coll. « Que sais-je? », 1979 and 1992
- Le Théâtre (with Daniel Couty), 1980
- Encyclopédies et dictionnaires — Que sais-je?, 1982
- Révolution, histoire d’un mot, 1989
- Le reveil-mots, 1998
- Des mots magiques, 2003
- À mots découverts, 2006
- Antoine Furetière : Un précurseur des Lumières sous Louis XIV, 2006
- Mille ans de langue française. Histoire d'une passion, Perrin, 2007
- L’amour du français : contre les puristes et autres censeurs de la langue, Denoël, 2007
- Miroirs du monde : une histoire de l'encyclopédisme, Fayard, 2007
- Lexi-com'. Tome 1, De Bravitude à Bling-Bling, Fayard, 2008.
- Le français : Une langue qui défie les siècles, coll. « Découvertes Gallimard / Histoire » (nº 537). Paris: Gallimard, 2008.

== Honours and awards ==
- Officier of the Order of Legion of Honour (2016)
- Commandeur of the Ordre National du Mérite (2006)
- Commandeur of the Ordre des Arts des Lettres
- Chevalier of the National Order of Quebec

== Quotes ==
On croit que l'on maîtrise les mots, mais ce sont les mots qui nous maîtrisent.
(We believe ourselves to master words, but it is words that master us.)

— Alain Rey

Le langage ne sert pas uniquement à s'exprimer, il sert aussi à mentir, à influencer, à se faire valoir.
(Language serves not only the task of explanation, but also that of deception, persuasion and exploitation.)

— Alain Rey

"France might be a republic but linguistically, it's still a monarchy... In my opinion, language must be an observatory, not a conservatory".

— Alain Rey, Fry's English Delight
