= Reforms of French orthography =

History of reform efforts in French orthography

French orthography was already (more or less) fixed and, from a phonological point of view, outdated when its lexicography developed in the late 17th century and the Académie française was mandated to establish an "official" prescriptive norm. Still, there was already much debate at the time opposing the tenets of a traditional, etymological orthography, and supporting those of a reformed, phonological transcription of the language.

César-Pierre Richelet chose the latter (reformed) option when he published the first monolingual French dictionary in 1680, but the Académie chose to adhere firmly to tradition in the first edition of its dictionary (1694).

Various other attempts at simplification followed, culminating in the "rectifications" of 6 December 1990. Further, more radical proposals also exist to simplify the existing writing system, but these have failed to gather much interest to date.

== 16th century ==
Spelling and punctuation before the 16th century was highly erratic, but the introduction of printing in 1470 provoked the need for uniformity.

Several Renaissance humanists (working with publishers) proposed reforms in French orthography, the most famous being Jacques Peletier du Mans who developed a phonemic-based spelling system and introduced new typographic signs (1550). Peletier continued to use his system in all his published works, but his reform was not followed.

== 18th century ==
L'Académie s'eſt donc vûe contrainte à faire dans cette nouvelle Edition, à ſon orthographe, pluſieurs changemens qu'elle n'avoit point jugé à propos d'adopter, lorſqu'elle donna l'Edition précédente.—Académie, 1740, using accents for the first time

The third (1740) and fourth (1762) editions of the Académie dictionary were very progressive, changing the spelling of about half the words altogether.

Accents, which had been in common use by printers for a long time, were finally adopted by the Académie, and many mute consonants were dropped.

estre → être (to be)
monachal → monacal (monastic)

Many changes suggested in the fourth edition were later abandoned along with thousands of neologisms added to it.

Very importantly too, subsequent 18th century editions of the dictionary added the letters J and V to the French alphabet in replacement of consonant I and U, fixing many cases of homography.

uil → vil (vile)

== 19th century ==
Many changes were introduced in the sixth edition of the Académie dictionary (1835), mainly under the influence of Voltaire. Most importantly, all oi digraphs that represented /ɛ/ were changed to ai, thus changing the whole imperfect conjugation of all verbs. The borrowings of connoisseur and foible into English predate this change; the modern French spellings are connaisseur and faible.

étois → étais (was)

The spelling of some plural words whose singular form ended in D and T was modified to reinsert this mute consonant, so as to bring the plural in morphological alignment with the singular. Only gent, gens retained the old form, because it was perceived that the singular and the plural had different meanings. The Académie had already tried to introduce a similar reform in 1694, but had given up with their dictionary's second edition.

parens → parents (parents)

In 1868, Ambroise Firmin-Didot suggested in his book Observations sur l'orthographe, ou ortografie, française (Observations on French Spelling) that French phonetics could be better regularized by adding a cedilla beneath the letter "t" in some words. For example, in the suffix -tion this letter is usually not pronounced as (or close to) /t/ in French, but as /sjɔ̃/. It has to be distinctly learned that in words such as diplomatie (but not diplomatique) it is pronounced /s/. A similar effect occurs with other prefixes or within words. Firmin-Didot surmised that a new character ţ could be added to French orthography.

== 20th century ==
With important dictionaries published at the turn of the 20th century, such as those of Émile Littré, Pierre Larousse, Arsène Darmesteter, and later Paul Robert, the Académie gradually lost much of its prestige.

Hence, new reforms suggested in 1901, 1935, and 1975 were almost totally ignored, except for the replacement of apostrophes with hyphens in some cases of (potential) elision in 1935.

grand'mère → grand-mère (grandmother)

Since the 1970s, though, calls for the modernisation of French orthography have grown stronger. In 1989, French prime minister Michel Rocard appointed the Superior Council of the French language to simplify French orthography by regularising it.

=== Rectifications of 1990 ===
The council, with the help of some Académie members and observers from Francophone states, published reforms that it called "rectifications orthographiques" on 6 December 1990.

Those "rectifications", instead of changing individual spellings, published general rules or lists of modified words. In total, around 2000 words have seen their spelling changed, and French morphology was also affected.

==== Hyphens ====
Numerals are joined with hyphens:

sept cent mille trois cent vingt et un → sept-cent-mille-trois-cent-vingt-et-un (700,321).

Elements of compound nouns are fused together:

- if one element is a verb: porte-monnaie → portemonnaie (wallet)
- in bahuvrihi compounds (where the individual sense of the elements has changed): sage-femme → sagefemme (midwife)
- in onomatopoeias: coin coin → coin-coin (quack).

Loan compounds are also fused together:

hot-dog → hotdog (hot dog).
week-end → weekend, aligning the word with its modern English spelling.

==== Number ====
Compound nouns joined with hyphens (or fused) make their plural using normal rules, that is adding a final s or x, unless the modifier is an adjective (in which case both elements must agree), or the head is a determined noun, or a proper noun:

des pèse-lettre → des pèse-lettres (letter scales)

Loanwords also have a regular plural:

lieder → lieds (songs)

==== Tréma ====
The tréma (known as a diaeresis in English) indicating exceptionally that the u is not silent in gu + vowel combinations is to be placed on the u instead of on the following vowel. Also, trémas are added to such words where they were not previously used:

aiguë → aigüe [ɛɡy] (fem. acute)
ambiguïté → ambigüité [ɑ̃biɡɥite] (ambiguity)
arguer → argüer [aʁɡɥe] (to argue)

A tréma is also added to a u following a silent e added to soften a g, to prevent the eu combination being read as [œ]:

gageure → gageüre [ɡaʒyʁ] (wager)

==== Accents ====
Verbs with their infinitive in éCer (where C can be any consonant) change their é to è in the future and conditional:

je céderai → je cèderai [ʒə sɛd(ə)ʁe] (I shall give up)

Additionally, verbs ending in e placed before an inverted subject "je" change their e to è instead of é:

aimé-je ? → aimè-je ? [ɛmɛʒ] (do I like?)

Circumflex accents are removed on i and u if they are not needed to distinguish between homographs. They are retained in the simple past and subjunctive of verbs:

mû → mu (driven), but qu'il mût unchanged (he must have driven), and
dû (the past participle of the very common irregular verb devoir, or the noun created from this participle) is kept to make the distinction with du (the required contraction of de + le, which means some when used as an undetermined masculine article, or means of the when used as a preposition).

Wherever accents are missing or wrong because of past errors or omissions or a change of pronunciation, they are added or changed:

receler → recéler [ʁəsele] (to receive – stolen goods)
événement → évènement [evɛn(ə)mɑ̃] (event)

Accents are also added to loanwords where dictated by French pronunciation:

diesel → diésel [djezɛl] (diesel)

==== Schwa changing into open e ====
In verbs with an infinitive in -eler or -eter, the opening of the schwa (/ə/ → /ɛ/) could previously be noted either by changing the e to è or by doubling the following l or t, depending on the verb in question. With this reform, only the first rule shall be used except in the cases of appeler, jeter, and their derivatives (which continue to use ll and tt respectively).

j'étiquette → j'étiquète (I label)

This applies also when those verbs are nominalized using the suffix -ement:

amoncellement → amoncèlement (pile)

==== Past participle agreement ====
Notwithstanding the normal rules (see French verbs), the past participle laissé followed by an infinitive never agrees with the object:

je les ai laissés partir → je les ai laissé partir (I let them go, literally: I have let them go)

This is an alleged simplification of the rules governing the agreement as applied to a past participle followed by an infinitive. The participle fait already followed an identical rule.

==== Miscellaneous ====
Many phenomena were considered as "anomalies" and thus "corrected". Some "families" of words from the same root showing inconsistent spellings were uniformized on the model of the most usual word in the "family".

imbécillité → imbécilité (idiocy)

This rule was also extended to suffixes in two cases, actually changing them into totally different morphemes altogether:

cuissot → cuisseau (haunch)
levraut → levreau (leveret)

Isolated words were adjusted to follow older reform where they had been omitted:

douceâtre → douçâtre (sickly sweet)
ognon → oignon (onion)

Lastly, some words have simply seen their spelling simplified, or fixed when it was uncertain:

pagaïe/pagaille/pagaye → pagaille (mess)
punch → ponch (punch)

==== Application ====
These "rectifications" were supposed to be applied as of 1991 but, following a period of agitation and the publication of many books such as the Union of copy editors' attacking new rules one by one, André Goosse's defending them, or Josette Rey-Debove's accepting a few (that have been added, as alternative spellings, to Le Robert), they appeared to become, for a while, dead proposals.

== 21st century ==
In 2004, an international institutional effort to revive the 1990 spelling reforms arose. Notably, a French-Belgian-Swiss association was set up to promote reform. In July of the same year, Microsoft announced that the French version of its applications would soon comply with the new spelling rules. On 23 March 2005, a version of Encarta was published using the new spelling, and, on 14 April 2005, an update of Microsoft Office was offered.

Officially, French people, including public workers, are free for an undetermined length of time to continue using the old spelling. The new spelling is "recommended", but both old and new are considered correct.

In Quebec, the Office québécois de la langue française, which was reluctant at first to apply what it prefers to call the "modernization", because of the opposition that it received in France, announced that it was now applying its rules to new borrowings and neologisms.

More and more publications are modernizing spelling. Le Forum, from the Université de Montréal, and Les Éditions Perce-Neige have adopted the new spelling.

In 2009, several major Belgian publishing groups began applying the new spelling in their online publications.

The 2009 edition of the Dictionnaire Le Robert incorporates most of the changes. There are 6000 words that have both the traditional and alternative spellings. The 2011 edition of the Dictionnaire Larousse incorporates all of the changes.

On 3 February 2016, a report by French television channel TF1 that the reforms would be applied from the next school year caused wide outrage. A "#JeSuisCirconflexe" campaign ensued on Twitter and the government was accused of "simplifying" the language. However, the government said the circumflex would not be eliminated and that pupils could use either the old or new spellings.

There are also fringe movements to further reform the language: one led by the linguist Mickael Korvin, who would like to radically simplify French by eliminating accents, punctuation and capital letters and, in 2016, invented a new way to spell French called nouvofrancet.

== See also ==
- Circumflex in French
- French orthography
