= Paul Robert (lexicographer) =

French lexicographer and publisher

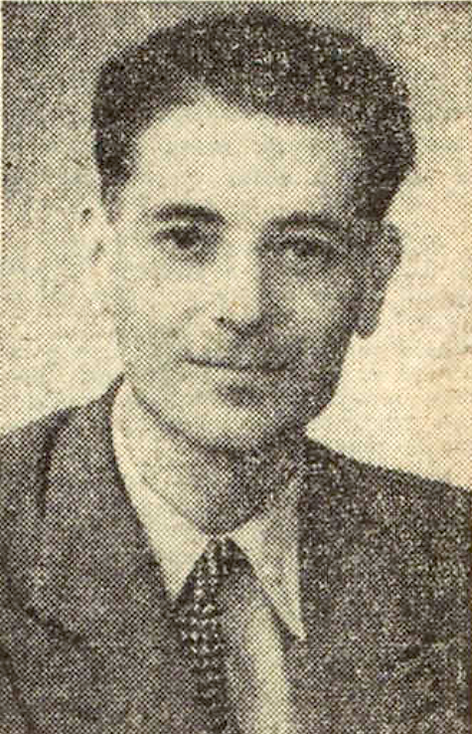
Paul Robert in 1950

Paul Charles Jules Robert (French pronunciation: [pɔl ʃaʁl ʒyl ʁɔbɛʁ]; 19 October 1910 in Orléansville – 11 August 1980 in Mougins) was a French lexicographer and publisher, best known for his large Dictionnaire alphabétique et analogique de la langue française (1953), often called simply the Robert (French: Le Robert, lit. 'The Robert'), and its abridgement, the Petit Robert (1967; French: Little Robert); who founded the dictionary company Dictionnaires Le Robert.

== See also ==
- Alain Rey
