= Superior Council of the French Language (France) =

Former French government advisory body on language policy

Conseil supérieur de la langue française
Advisory council overview
- Formed: 2 June 1989
- Preceding agencies: Comité consultatif de la langue française; Commissariat général de la langue française
- Dissolved: 2009
- Jurisdiction: Government of France
- Advisory council executive: Prime Minister of France, President (ex officio)
- Parent Advisory council: Prime Minister

The Conseil supérieur de la langue française (CSLF; lit. 'Superior Council of the French Language') was an advisory body of the Government of France concerned with French-language policy. It was created in 1989 and placed under the Prime Minister of France. Its responsibilities included advising the government on the use, development, enrichment, promotion and dissemination of French in France and abroad, as well as on policy concerning foreign languages.

The council worked alongside the Délégation générale à la langue française et aux langues de France (DGLFLF), which provided its secretariat. It is particularly associated with the preparation of the 1990 rectifications of French orthography, published in the Journal officiel de la République française in December 1990.

== History ==
=== Predecessors ===
The council formed part of a succession of French government bodies concerned with language policy. In 1966, the government of Georges Pompidou created the Haut Comité pour la défense et l'expansion de la langue française (High Committee for the Defence and Expansion of the French Language), attached to the prime minister. In 1973 it was renamed the Haut Comité de la langue française.

In 1984 the high committee was replaced by two bodies attached to the prime minister: the Comité consultatif de la langue française, an advisory committee dealing with the use and dissemination of French, Francophonie, the languages of France and foreign-language policy; and the Commissariat général de la langue française, which had an administrative and coordinating role.

=== Creation of the council ===
In May 1989, Prime Minister Michel Rocard proposed replacing the 1984 bodies with a new council and a general delegation for the French language. The reform was enacted by Decree No. 89-403 of 2 June 1989. The new Conseil supérieur de la langue française was placed under the prime minister, while a Délégation générale à la langue française (DGLF) was established to coordinate and implement language-policy measures.

The council was charged with studying questions relating to the use, planning, enrichment, promotion and dissemination of French within and outside France. It could make proposals, recommend government action and issue opinions on matters referred to it by the prime minister or by ministers responsible for culture, education and Francophonie.

In 2001, the DGLF was renamed the Délégation générale à la langue française et aux langues de France (DGLFLF), reflecting the extension of its responsibilities to the other languages traditionally spoken in France. The change concerned the delegation rather than the council itself.

== Organisation and membership ==
The Prime Minister of France was ex officio president of the council and could be represented by the minister responsible for culture or the minister responsible for Francophonie. The ministers responsible for national education and Francophonie and the perpetual secretaries of the Académie française and the Académie des sciences were members ex officio. The president of the French government's general commission on terminology and neology later also became an ex officio member.

In addition, between 19 and 25 members were appointed by decree for renewable four-year terms. They were selected for their expertise or contribution to the study, knowledge, dissemination or use of French.

The membership was deliberately drawn from a wide range of linguistic, literary, scientific and cultural backgrounds. Members at various times included linguists Bernard Quemada, Bernard Cerquiglini, Claude Hagège, Jean-Claude Chevalier and Henriette Walter; writers Tahar Ben Jelloun, Anne Hébert and Jorge Semprún; filmmaker Jean-Luc Godard; journalist and television presenter Bernard Pivot; publisher Odile Jacob; singer-songwriter Pierre Perret; and filmmaker Bertrand Tavernier.

The vice-president was responsible for organising and directing the council's work. Linguist Bernard Quemada served as vice-president from the council's creation until 1999. He was succeeded by Bernard Cerquiglini in June 1999. Writer and publisher Yves Berger was appointed vice-president in October 2003.

== 1990 orthographic rectifications ==
Debate over the simplification of French spelling preceded the council's establishment. On 7 February 1989, ten linguists—Nina Catach, Bernard Cerquiglini, Jean-Claude Chevalier, Pierre Encrevé, Maurice Gross, Claude Hagège, Robert Martin, Michel Masson, Jean-Claude Milner and Bernard Quemada—published an appeal in Le Monde entitled Moderniser l'écriture du français ("Modernising the writing of French").

In October 1989, Rocard asked the newly created council to examine a limited set of spelling "rectifications and tolerances", while retaining existing spellings as acceptable forms. A working group was formed under the chairmanship of Maurice Druon, then perpetual secretary of the Académie française.

The resulting recommendations concerned, among other matters, the spelling of compound words, the plural of compounds, the circumflex accent on i and u, the use of the grave accent in certain words, the treatment of loanwords, and a number of individual spelling anomalies. They were published as Les rectifications de l'orthographe in the administrative-documents edition of the Journal officiel on 6 December 1990.

The Académie française unanimously approved the 1990 document while stating that the recommendations should not be imposed administratively and should instead be tested by usage over time. The Académie subsequently incorporated some of the rectified forms into its dictionary and recorded others as alternatives.

The recommendations later acquired a place in the French educational system. The 2008 primary-school curriculum stated that the revised spelling was the reference form for teaching. Later curricula continued to recognise the 1990 rectifications; current guidance accepts traditional and rectified spellings as equally correct.

== Inactivity and end of the council ==
The council's membership was renewed in 2003, with Yves Berger appointed vice-president. Berger died on 16 November 2004. By June 2006, the Ministry of Culture reported to the National Assembly that the council had not met since his death, although at that time a possible reorganisation of the body was still being considered.

A general reform of French government advisory commissions was introduced by Decree No. 2006-672 of 8 June 2006. Rather than immediately abolishing every existing commission, the decree provided that regulations establishing pre-existing advisory commissions would lapse after three years unless renewed.

The provisions of the 1989 decree defining the council's mission, membership, presidency and meetings consequently ceased to have effect on 9 June 2009. The council was not among the Ministry of Culture advisory bodies whose existence was extended in June 2009.

The DGLFLF, unlike the council, continued to operate and remains the French Ministry of Culture body responsible for coordinating government policy concerning the French language and the languages of France.

== See also ==
- Académie Française
- Reforms of French orthography
- Superior Council of the French Language (disambiguation)
