= Conseil d'État (disambiguation) =

Conseil d'État may refer to:

- Council of State (Belgium), an organ of the Belgian government
- Conseil d'État, a body of the French national government
- Conseil d'État (Switzerland), government of some of the cantons of Switzerland
- Council of State of Luxembourg, an institution in Luxembourg that advises the national legislature
