= Mickael Korvin =

American literary critic

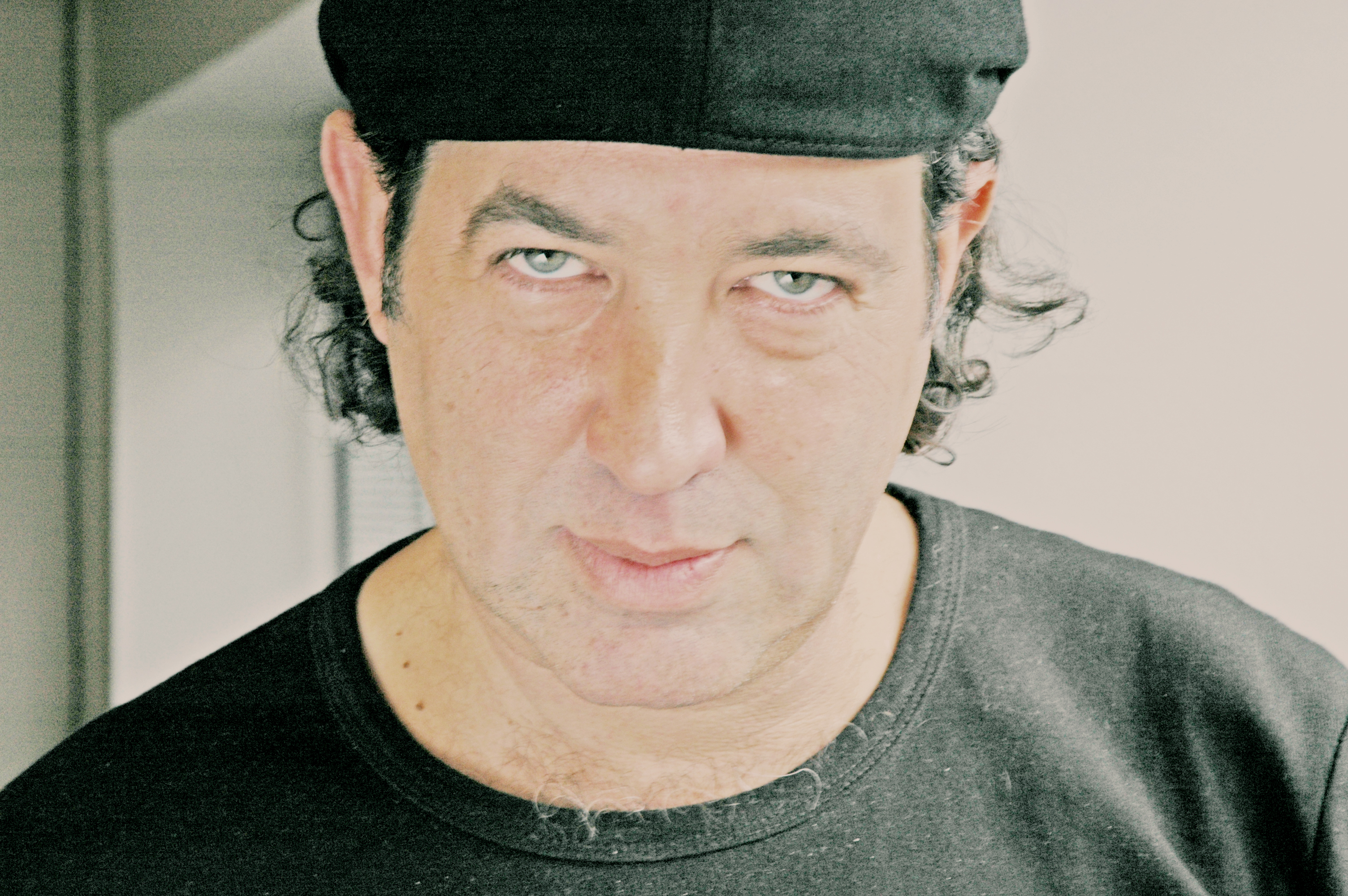
- Mickael Korvin in 1991
- Born: Mickael Korvin
- Citizenship: United States
- Occupations: translator; journalist; linguist; poet; novelist
- Writing career
- Notable work: Journal d'une cause perdue
- Website: nice.tv worthshit.ai

Mickael Korvin is a Franco-American author and translator. He is the creator of a French spelling reform called "nouvofrancet", an extremely simplified orthography for French.

== Works ==
Fluent in the English and French languages, Korvin has alternated between writing novels in French and English, and translating foreign texts into French. His early work, Le boucher du Vaccarès (1990) and Je, Toro (1991) revisited the nouveau roman in an attempt to break what Korvin saw as the reigning nostalgia in contemporary French letters. Korvin's translations include Iggy Pop's I Need More and 19th-century American anarchist Lysander Spooner's Vices Are Not Crimes. Korvin formerly worked in advertising and journalism, but subsequently became a full-time writer and linguist. He is also a dealer in antique toys and art brut from his stall in the les Puces flea market in Saint-Ouen, northern Paris.

== Spelling reform ==
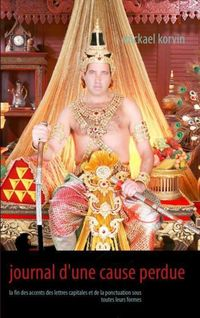
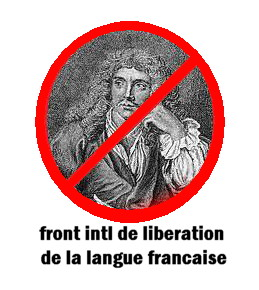

In early 2012, Korvin published a novel, Journal d'une cause perdue, which formed part of his campaign (which he called 'korvinism') to abolish accents, capital letters and all punctuation from written language, specifically the French language. His campaign gained notoriety in France as a result of a promotional video Korvin filmed with Franco-Algerian rapper Morsay, during which the rapper threatened to sexually violate grammarian and member of the Académie française Érik Orsenna. During the video, Korvin called Orsenna a "dictator of grammar" who is "killing the French language." The video was filmed in Les Puces, a flea-market in the Saint-Ouen area of Paris. An article on the website of French culture magazine L'Express called Korvin's intervention "fleas against the Académie française" (Les puces contre L'Académie française), while the same article compared Korvin's stance in Journal d'une cause perdue to Queneau, Apollinaire, Perec and Tristan Tzara. An article in le Nouvel Observateur compared Korvin's stance on punctuation with those of Georges Perec, Mathias Énard and Philippe Sollers. When contacted for a response to Korvin's position, Orsenna's publicist, in an attempt to put an end to the feud, provided a brief statement suited to the author of An Elegy for Punctuation: "full stop".

Korvin subsequently proposed himself for membership of the Académie, in a public letter that was published on the website of L'Express. The controversy was also covered by the magazine Les Inrocks and the daily newspaper Libération. In mid-April 2012 another video was posted online, in which Korvin and Morsay, wearing balaclavas and calling themselves the "front intl de libération de la langue française", humiliated the broadcaster and writer Patrick Poivre d'Arvor, calling him a plagiarist (referring to accusations that Poivre d'Arvre, who has also been nominated for membership of the Académie, plagiarized portions of his recent biography of Ernest Hemingway from another work) and the Machiavelli of the media. On April 19, 2012, Korvin was officially listed as a candidate to the Académie. On April 26, 2012, following the vote to fill another empty chair at the Académie, at the fourth vote, Poivre d'Arvor only received the votes of two academicians, including one from Erik Orsenna. On that same day, Korvin published a manifesto for the simplification of French on L'Express titled j'abuse in reference to the J'Accuse...! by Émile Zola, published on January 13, 1898.

In the beginning of 2016, Korvin published his ninth novel, L'homme qui se croyait plus beau qu'il n'était at which occasion he also introduced his nouvofrancet (a very simplified alternative to traditional French spelling) under the alternative title lom qi se croyet plubo qil netet, which is the same as the paper format, but using the simplified spelling that he had proposed.

== Bibliography ==
=== Novels ===
- Le Boucher du Vaccarès, et Le Napo (Éditions Jacqueline Chambon - Actes Sud 1991).
- Je, Toro (Éditions Jacqueline Chambon - Actes Sud 1992).
- New Age Romance (Les Belles Lettres 1993, Le Serpent à Plumes 2000).
- How to Make a Killing on the Internet (Pegasus Publishers - UK 2001).
- Le Jeûne (Parisvibrations.com 2009).
- Biorgie (Parisvibrations.com 2010).
- Journal d'une cause perdue (Parisvibrations.com 2012).
- L'homme qui se croyait plus beau qu'il n'était (The man who thought he was better-looking than he really was - Le Serpent à Plumes 2016)
- Sire Concis - une histoire de prépuce qui repousse comme une mauvaise herbe (Sir Concise - a story about a foreskin that grows back like a bad weed).
- Escape from the matrix 2026 (How to find your founding event and attain peace).
- Le Francais Nouveau Genre Dominera le monde (in French, the last letter determines whether masculine or feminine).
- Bipolator (https://rainfolk.com/2026/06/mickael-korvin-bipolator-roman.html )

=== Translations ===
- Tim Winton, Cet oeil, le ciel, [That Eye, The Sky] 1991.
- Samuel Fuller, Cerebro-Choc, (translated with Jean-Yves Prate), 1993.
- Lysander Spooner, Les Vices ne sont pas des crimes, 1993.
- Iggy Pop, I Need More, 1994.
- Alexandre S. Pouchkine (Alexander Pushkin), Journal Secret (1836–1837), 2011.

=== Other writings ===
- Rémy Magron, Sado-maso-chic, (contribution by Mickael Korvin), 1995.
- Honored at the Webby Awards 2015 and Silver Award at the 2015 Davey Awards (@twitersavior) for the hashtag #AMessageToTheMartians (Social/Weird category) and a second Silver Davey in 2016 for #TheBrightSideOfBrexit

=== Visual art ===
- Signs of Hope a positive homeless signs exhibit for The Bethesda Project, Philadelphia November 2016
