= French language =

Romance language

French
- français
- Pronunciation: [fʁɑ̃sɛ]
- Native to: France, Belgium, Switzerland, Monaco, Luxembourg, Francophone Africa, Canada, and other locations in the Francophonie
- Speakers: L1: 74 million (2012–2024); L2: 238 million (2012–2022); Total: 312 million
- Language family: Indo-European: Italic; Latino-Faliscan; Latinic; Romance; Italo-Western; Western Romance; Gallo-Iberian; Gallo-Romance; Gallo-Rhaetian?; Arpitan–Oïl; Oïl; Francien zone; French
- Early forms: Old Latin: Vulgar Latin; Proto-Romance; Old Gallo-Romance; Old French; Middle French
- Writing system: Latin script (French alphabet); French Braille
- Signed forms: Signed French (français signé)

Official status
- Official language in: 26 countries: Belgium; Benin; Burundi; Cameroon; Canada; Central African Republic; Chad; Comoros; Congo; Democratic Republic of the Congo; Djibouti; Equatorial Guinea; France; Gabon; Guinea; Haiti; Ivory Coast; Luxembourg; Madagascar; Monaco; Rwanda; Senegal; Seychelles; Switzerland; Togo; Vanuatu; 10 subnational: Aosta Valley (Italy); French Polynesia; Louisiana (United States); Maine (United States); New Caledonia; Puducherry (India); Saint Barthélemy; Saint Martin; Saint Pierre and Miquelon; Wallis and Futuna; Organizations including the OIF, UN, IOC, CGPM, ICRC, EU, AU, NATO, WTO and CoE
- Regulated by: Académie Française (France); Office québécois de la langue française (Quebec); Direction de la langue française (Belgium)

Language codes
- ISO 639-1: fr
- ISO 639-2: fre (B) fra (T)
- ISO 639-3: fra
- Glottolog: stan1290
- Linguasphere: 51-AAA-i
- Countries and regions where French is the native language of the majority (Note: Dots: cities with native transmission, typically a minority.) Countries and regions where French is an official or de facto official language, but not a majority native language Countries, regions, and territories where French is an administrative or cultural language but with no official status

French (français [fʁɑ̃sɛ] or langue française [lɑ̃ɡ fʁɑ̃sɛːz]) is a Romance language of the Indo-European family. Like all other Romance languages, French and its closest relatives—the langues d'oïl, historically spoken in northern France and southern Belgium—descended from the Vulgar Latin of the Roman Empire. It was influenced by native Celtic languages of Northern Roman Gaul and by the Germanic Frankish language of the post-Roman Frankish invaders. Over time, French largely supplanted most regional Romance varieties across France, Belgium and Switzerland. As a result of French and later Belgian colonialism, it was introduced to new territories in the Americas, Africa, and Asia, and numerous French-based creole languages, most notably Haitian Creole, were developed. A French-speaking person or nation may be referred to as Francophone in both English and French.

French is the 22nd most natively spoken language in the world, the sixth most spoken language by total number of speakers, and is among the five most studied languages worldwide, with about 120 million learners in 2017. It is estimated to have about 310 million speakers, of which about 74 million are native speakers; it is spoken as a first language (in descending order of the number of speakers) in France, Canada (Quebec), Belgium (Wallonia and the Brussels-Capital Region), western Switzerland (Romandy region), Luxembourg, and Monaco. Meanwhile, in Francophone Africa it is spoken mainly as a second language or lingua franca, though it has also become a native language in several urban areas. In some North African countries like Algeria and Morocco, it is the primary language for the elite (alongside Arabic) while being an auxiliary language for the general population. French is an official language in 26 countries, as well as one of the most geographically widespread languages in the world, with speakers in about 50 countries. Most of these countries are members of the Organisation internationale de la Francophonie (OIF), the community of 54 member states which share the use or teaching of French. In 2025, approximately 50% of the Francophone population lived in sub-Saharan Africa and the Indian Ocean, 30% lived in Europe, 15% in North Africa, 7% in the Americas, and a small percent in Asia and Oceania. French is the second most widely spoken mother tongue in the European Union. Of Europeans who speak other languages natively, approximately one-fifth are able to speak French as a second language.

French has a long history as an international language of literature, diplomacy and science and is a primary or second language of many international organizations including the United Nations, the European Union, the North Atlantic Treaty Organization, the World Trade Organization, the International Olympic Committee, the General Conference on Weights and Measures, and the International Committee of the Red Cross. Many institutions of the EU use French as a working language along with English, German and Italian; in some institutions, French is the sole working language (e.g. at the Court of Justice of the European Union).

== History ==
French is a Romance language (meaning that it is descended primarily from Vulgar Latin) that evolved out of the Gallo-Romance dialects spoken in northern France. The language's early forms include Old French and Middle French.

=== Vulgar Latin in Gaul ===
Due to Roman rule, Latin was gradually adopted by the inhabitants of Gaul. As the language was learned by the common people, it developed a distinct local character, with grammatical differences from Latin as spoken elsewhere, some of which is attested in graffiti. This local variety evolved into the Gallo-Romance tongues, which include French and its closest relatives, such as Franco-Provençal.

The Gaulish language likely survived into the sixth century in France despite considerable Romanization. Coexisting with Latin, Gaulish helped shape the Vulgar Latin dialects that developed into French contributing loanwords and calques (including oui, the word for "yes"), sound changes shaped by Gaulish influence, and influences in conjugation and word order. Recent computational studies suggest that early gender shifts may have been motivated by the gender of the corresponding word in Gaulish.

Following the Roman conquest of Gaul, 90% of the population remained indigenous in origin. Furthermore, sociological factors drove an uneven language shift. Latin spread from urban centers—such as Narbonensis—into rural hinterlands as native populations became bilingual. Although the Roman state lacked a deliberate policy of suppression, its requirement that formal administration use Latin accelerated the language's adoption in regulated zones.

During the Crisis of the Third Century, locals increasingly adopted Latin to communicate with Germanic tribes and Roman settlers. Consequently, writing in Gaulish and monolingualism all but disappeared between the 4th and 5th centuries. By the time the Romans left, the majority of the population spoke a mix of Celtic, Latin, and occasionally Greek. Additionally, because Northern Gaul was politically cut off from the Mediterranean by the 5th century, its local Latin diverged sharply from standard grammar rules. Overall, Latin was largely adopted by the masses after the Roman departure, largely because of the increasing influence of missionaries and the Romanized elite as sources of authority, rather than the central Imperial authority.

The estimated number of French words that can be attributed to Gaulish is placed at 154 by the Petit Robert, which is often viewed as representing standardized French, while if non-standard dialects are included, the number increases to 240. Known Gaulish loans are skewed toward certain semantic fields, such as plant life (chêne, bille, etc.), animals (mouton, cheval, etc.), nature (boue, etc.), domestic activities (ex. berceau), farming and rural units of measure (arpent, lieue, borne, boisseau), weapons, and products traded regionally rather than further afield. This semantic distribution has been attributed to peasants being the last to hold onto Gaulish.

=== Old French ===
The beginning of French in Gaul was greatly influenced by Germanic invasions into the country. These invasions had the greatest impact on the northern part of the country and on the language there. A language divide began to grow across the country. The population in the north spoke langues d'oïl while the population in the south spoke langues d'oc. One langue d'oïl became Old French. The Old French period spanned between the late 8th and mid-14th centuries. Old French shared many characteristics with Latin. For example, Old French used different word orders, just as Latin did, because it had a case system retaining the distinction between nominative subjects and oblique non-subjects. The period is marked by a heavy superstrate influence from the Germanic Frankish language, which non-exhaustively included the use in upper-class speech and higher registers of V2 word order, a large percentage of the vocabulary (now at around 15% of modern French vocabulary) including the impersonal singular pronoun on (a calque of Germanic man), and the name of the language itself.

Up until its later stages, Old French, alongside the langue d'oc called Old Occitan, maintained a relic of the old nominal case system of Latin longer than most other Romance languages (with the notable exception of Romanian which still currently maintains a case distinction), differentiating between an oblique case and a nominative case. The phonology was characterized by heavy syllabic stress, which led to the emergence of various complicated diphthongs such as -eau, which would later be leveled as monophthongs.

The earliest evidence of what became Old French can be seen in the Oaths of Strasbourg and the Sequence of Saint Eulalia, while Old French literature began to be produced in the eleventh century, with major early works often focusing on the lives of saints (such as the Vie de Saint Alexis), or wars and royal courts, notably including the Chanson de Roland, the Matter of Britain, as well as a cycle focused on William of Orange.

During the period of the Crusades, French became so dominant in the Mediterranean Sea that it became the lingua franca (literally 'Frankish language'). Due to increased contact with Arabs (who referred to the Crusaders as Franj), numerous Arabic loanwords entered French, such as amiral (admiral), alcool (alcohol), coton (cotton) and sirop (syrup), as well as scientific terms such as algébre (algebra), alchimie (alchemy) and zéro (zero).

=== Middle French ===
Within Old French many dialects emerged but the Francien dialect is one that not only continued but also thrived during the Middle French period between the mid-14th to the early 17th centuries. Modern French grew out of this Francien dialect. The status of French as a global language of administration and diplomacy is not merely a product of modern history, but the result of a process of state-building that began in the Crusader states.

The transition towards French as a formal language began in the Kingdom of Jerusalem. Facing a crisis of authority during the War of the Lombards of the mid-13th century, the nobility replaced Latin with Outremer French—a koiné of Parisian, Norman, and Picard dialects—to codify the Assizes of Jerusalem. For the knights and jurists of Outremer, this refined vernacular became a vital tool for legal security in matters of property and inheritance, distinguishing them from Byzantines, Muslims, and newly arrived European crusaders. The military elite, who often lacked academic training in Latin, standardized laws they could read and debate in their native tongue.

This made Jerusalem the first state to implement French for legal and administrative security, three decades before France itself. This administrative model "rebounded" to Europe through Louis IX, who, after his stay in the Levant (1250–1254), professionalized the French chancery. This trajectory reached its legal peak with the Ordinance of Villers-Cotterêts (1539), where Francis I mandated French as the exclusive language for all legal acts and official communications, effectively ending the official role of Latin and centralizing the state around the Parisian standard.

Grammatically, during the period of Middle French, noun declensions were lost and there began to be standardized rules. Robert Estienne published the first Latin-French dictionary, which included information about phonetics, etymology, and grammar. Politically, the first government authority to adopt Modern French as the official language was the Aosta Valley in 1536, three years before France itself.

=== Modern French ===
During the 17th century, French replaced Latin as the most important language of diplomacy and international relations (lingua franca). It retained this role until approximately the middle of the 20th century, when it was replaced by English as the United States became the dominant global power following the Second World War. Stanley Meisler of the Los Angeles Times said that the fact that the Treaty of Versailles was written in English as well as French was the "first diplomatic blow" against the language.

During the Grand Siècle (17th century), France, under the rule of powerful leaders such as Cardinal Richelieu and Louis XIV, enjoyed a period of prosperity and prominence among European nations. Richelieu established the Académie française to protect the French language. By the early 1800s, Parisian French had become the primary language of the aristocracy in France.

Near the beginning of the 19th century, the French government began to pursue policies with the end goal of eradicating the many minorities and regional languages (patois) spoken in France. This began in 1794 with Henri Grégoire's "Report on the necessity and means to annihilate the patois and to universalize the use of the French language". When public education was made compulsory, only French was taught and the use of any other (patois) language was punished. The goals of the public school system were made especially clear to the French-speaking teachers sent to teach students in regions such as Occitania and Brittany. Instructions given by a French official to teachers in the department of Finistère, in western Brittany, included the following: "And remember, Gents: you were given your position in order to kill the Breton language". The prefect of Basses-Pyrénées in the French Basque Country wrote in 1846: "Our schools in the Basque Country are particularly meant to replace the Basque language with French..." Students were taught that their ancestral languages were inferior and they should be ashamed of them; this process was known in the Occitan-speaking region as Vergonha.

=== French in the 21st century ===
In the 21st century, the French language has undergone significant transformations in both linguistic and sociopolitical contexts. Linguistically, French is increasingly shaped by regional variations, particularly those emerging from sub-Saharan Africa. Youth sociolects and vernacular influences, such as Camfranglais in Cameroon and Nouchi in Côte d'Ivoire, have given rise to hybrid linguistic forms that not only dominate local informal communication but are also gaining traction in Francophone popular culture, music, and social media across the broader Francosphere. While there is significant variation in spoken French, written French stays largely consistent. While French is a significant language on the internet ranking fourth, only approximately 65.5% of Francophones have access to the internet. In the 21st century, French remains a major language for business, diplomacy, and culture though its use, geography, and sociopolitical context continues to shift with declines in some areas (including academia) and growth in others.

On a global scale, the number of French speakers continues to rise, largely attributable to demographic growth in sub-Saharan Africa, where French serves as an official, educational, and administrative language in numerous states. French now serves as a language of instruction in the educational systems serving approximately 93 million pupils from 36 countries and governments worldwide, 24 of which are located in the Africa–Indian Ocean and Middle East regions, either as the sole language or in combination with others. Notably, 80% of students attending French-language schools are in Africa, where French is commonly used both for teaching and as a shared means of communication among different communities. The majority of Francophones in the sub-Saharan region and the Maghreb are young, and are found in the 15–24 age group. This growth contrasts with the declining presence of French in parts of Asia, particularly in former French colonies such as Vietnam, Laos, and Cambodia, where it has been largely replaced by local languages and English in both public life and education, though significant immigrant populations from these regions continue in France and other francophone regions.

In sociopolitical terms, French remains deeply entangled in debates over language, identity, and historical legacy. In the Republic of the Congo, the Democratic Republic of the Congo, Côte d'Ivoire, and Cameroon, (among others) French remains the undisputed language of government, formal education, and major media. The 2022 OIF report highlights that in Kinshasa, Brazzaville, Abidjan, and Yaoundé, French serves as the dominant vehicular language, so entrenched that many urban children acquire it alongside local vernaculars as a de facto first language. Several Sahelian states have formally curtailed French as part of postcolonial language-planning. Many governments and residents perceive it to be a remnant of colonial rule, in a complex context of cultural and political sovereignty discussions, local and Russian propaganda, political and military conflicts, and other factors. In July 2023, Mali's constitutional referendum demoted French from "official" to merely "working" status while elevating thirteen indigenous tongues to constitutional parity. Burkina Faso's transitional authorities have announced similar plans to strip French of its official role, framing these moves as assertions of cultural sovereignty as well as a closer relationship to Russian than France. Yet in both Bamako and Ouagadougou, French endures as the lingua franca of higher education, national media, and interethnic commerce. The language being primarily spoken by secondary-language speakers who have mixed use of the language but reflecting the complicated role of the language in these contexts amidst French military withdrawal in Africa, rising nationalism, shifting alliances, and other factors.

In longstanding Francophone strongholds, policymakers now seek a more balanced multilingual landscape. Senegal's government has expanded Wolof-language programming on public television and begun renaming colonial-era names in Dakar, even though French remains the sole constitutional language and continues to dominate academia. This reflects a real commitment seen in Senegal and elsewhere to shift from French to local languages or English. Algeria has mandated Arabic-medium instruction in formerly Francophone private schools and introduced English tracks at its universities, framed as part of a broader multilingual strategy but in the context of diplomatic issues with France, yet French persists in judicial proceedings, international business, and everyday urban speech in Algiers and Oran and debate continues internally on language in the country. Meanwhile, in Morocco and Tunisia, French continues to enjoy high prestige, both governments maintain bilingual curricula in secondary and tertiary education, and French remains the lingua franca of tourism, scientific research, and many private-sector enterprises. Québec has doubled down on French through Bill 96 (An Act respecting French, the official and common language of Québec), assented on 1 June 2022. Bill 96 reaffirms French as the province's sole official language, tightens requirements for French language services and commercial signage, and expands the Charter of the French Language's scope which are measures designed to counter anglophone pressures and reinforce cultural identity. Similarly, countries such as Madagascar, Central African Republic, Chad, and Haiti, have legally committed to French alongside local languages.

Overall, French remains a practical and widely accepted medium of communication, particularly where linguistic diversity demands a neutral lingua franca. Despite regional tensions or reductions in certain contexts, French continues to expand as a global language of diplomacy, development, and multilateral cooperation. Several non-Francophone countries, including Rwanda, Ethiopia, Ghana, and even countries outside Africa such as Moldova and the United Arab Emirates, have joined or expanded their involvement in the Organisation internationale de la Francophonie (OIF). Their participation reflects an interest in leveraging French for international diplomacy, educational exchange, and regional economic integration. French is also used for collaboration on public health, economic development, business and local governance including through the Association internationale des maires francophones (AIMF) and other organizations.

Francophone collaboration today spans an increasingly diverse set of domains. In media, international broadcasters such as TV5Monde, Radio France Internationale (RFI), and France 24 play key roles in disseminating French-language content worldwide, especially across Africa, Europe, the Middle East, and the Caribbean. In education, institutions like the Agence universitaire de la Francophonie (AUF) and Espace Francophone pour la Recherche, Développement et l'Innovation support research and academic partnerships between Francophone universities across five continents. In culture, the arts, and sports events like the Jeux de la Francophonie foster artistic exchange and culture and reflect increased francophone art and culture emerging outside of Europe and used in local communities around the world including new francophone social media, francophone cinema, TV, francophone literature, art, francophone music, and sport.

=== Future ===
==== Recent growth ====
Per the OIF, between 2022 and 2025, use of French experienced significant growth, increasing from 321 to between 348 and 396 million speakers (depending on the methodology used). The first method counts all native speakers in countries considered natively Francophone (France, Monaco, and the Francohpone regions of Belgium, Switzerland, and Canada). In other countries where French is an official language, co-official language, or language of instruction only children aged 10 and older and adults aged 15 and older who are literate in French are counted. The second method additionally includes children aged 6–9 who are literate in French in countries of the Global South where French is an official language, co-official language, or language of instruction. Under this method there are 396 million French speakers, distributed across the five continents, nearly 65% of whom are in Africa. Given the second methodology, the OIF states that French is the fourth most spoken language in the world, with 170 million students enrolled in French language education or courses, and the language being the third most used for business and fourth most used on the internet.

==== Factors in growth ====
Growth of French is caused by many factors including population growth in Africa, a youthful Francophone population, urbanization and improved educational access. In 2025, approximately 70% of Francophones live in urban areas as the world continues to urbanize. The Francophone population is young. In 2025, around 150 million young Francophones represent 30.6% of the total population. In 2024, more than 170 million pupils in 36 countries around the world received education in French or learned French in institutional settings, in contexts of French as a native, or French as a second language. The number of learners of French as a foreign language worldwide is estimated at 51 million learners. Primary education remains the main point of growth for French, particularly in countries such as Niger, Benin, Burkina Faso, Côte d'Ivoire, Mali, and the Democratic Republic of the Congo, where school enrollment rates have risen quickly since 2010. In Côte d'Ivoire the number of Francophones is growing rapidly, at a pace higher than demographic growth. French language use increased from 7.4 million in 2010 to 17.1 million in 2025 (+131%) while the country's population grew from 22 to 33 million (52%) during the same period. In the Democratic Republic of the Congo the number of French speakers grew from rom 31 million in 2010 to 68 million in 2025.

French usage is also growing to formal organizational initiatives, business, and culture. The Agency for French Education Abroad has 600 locations and 397,000 students as of 2025. The Alliance Francaise network has almost 1,000 locations with 824 main branches and 160 affiliated branches spread across 138 countries. Within this system, there are 450,000 students including 420,000 students of French and 33,000 students in other courses. Combined with the Institut de France (IF) there are 912,000 students enrolled in language centers outside of France. Due to France's Campus France program, over 440,000 international students study in France and students studying at numerous other universities in the Agence universitaire de la Francophonie.

According to a demographic projection led by the Réseau Démographie de l'Agence universitaire de la Francophonie, the total number of French speakers will reach approximately 500 million in 2025 and over 1 billion by 2050, largely due to rapid population growth in sub-Saharan Africa. in 2026, the OIF estimated French will be spoken by between 466 million and 666 million people by 2050, the majority of which 9 of 10 will live in Africa.

== Geographic distribution ==
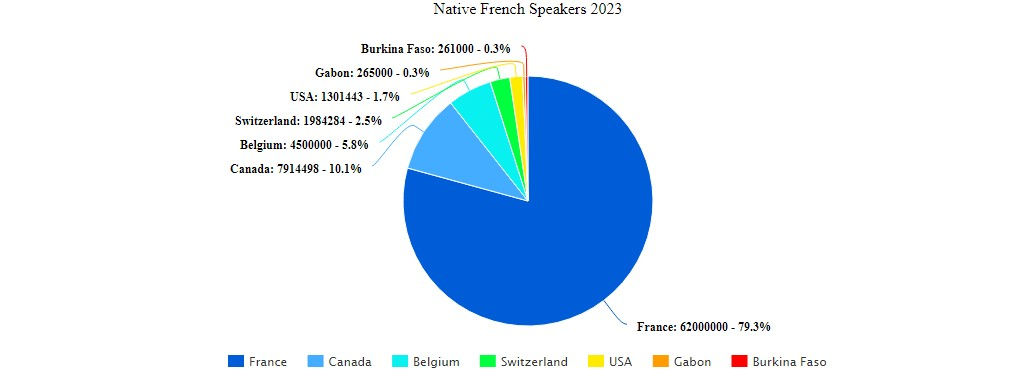
Distribution of native French speakers in 6 countries in 2023

=== Europe ===
Knowledge of French in the European Union and candidate countries

Spoken by 19.71% of the European Union's population, French is the third most widely spoken language in the EU, after English and German and the second-most-widely taught language after English.

Under the Constitution of France, French has been the official language of the Republic since 1992, although the Ordinance of Villers-Cotterêts made it mandatory for legal documents in 1539. France mandates the use of French in official government publications, public education except in specific cases, and legal contracts; advertisements must bear a translation of foreign words.

In Belgium, French is an official language at the federal level along with Dutch and German. At the regional level, French is the sole official language of Wallonia (excluding a part of the East Cantons, which are German-speaking) and one of the two official languages—along with Dutch—of the Brussels-Capital Region, where it is spoken by the majority of the population (approx. 80%), often as their primary language.

French is one of the four official languages of Switzerland, along with German, Italian, and Romansh, and is spoken in the western part of Switzerland, called Romandy, of which Geneva is the largest city. The language divisions in Switzerland do not coincide with political subdivisions, and some cantons have bilingual status: for example, cities such as Biel/Bienne and cantons such as Valais, Fribourg and Bern. French is the native language of about 23% of the Swiss population, and is spoken by 50% of the population.

Along with Luxembourgish and German, French is one of the three official languages of Luxembourg, where it is generally the preferred language of business as well as of the different public administrations. It is also the official language of Monaco.

At a regional level, French is acknowledged as an official language in the Aosta Valley region of Italy (the first government authority to adopt Modern French as the official language in 1536, three years before France itself), in which is spoken as a first language by 1.25% of the population and as a second one by approximately 50%. French dialects remain spoken by minorities on the Channel Islands; it is also spoken in Andorra and is the main language after Catalan in El Pas de la Casa. The language is taught as the primary second language in the German state of Saarland, with French being taught from pre-school and over 43% of citizens being able to speak French.

=== Africa ===
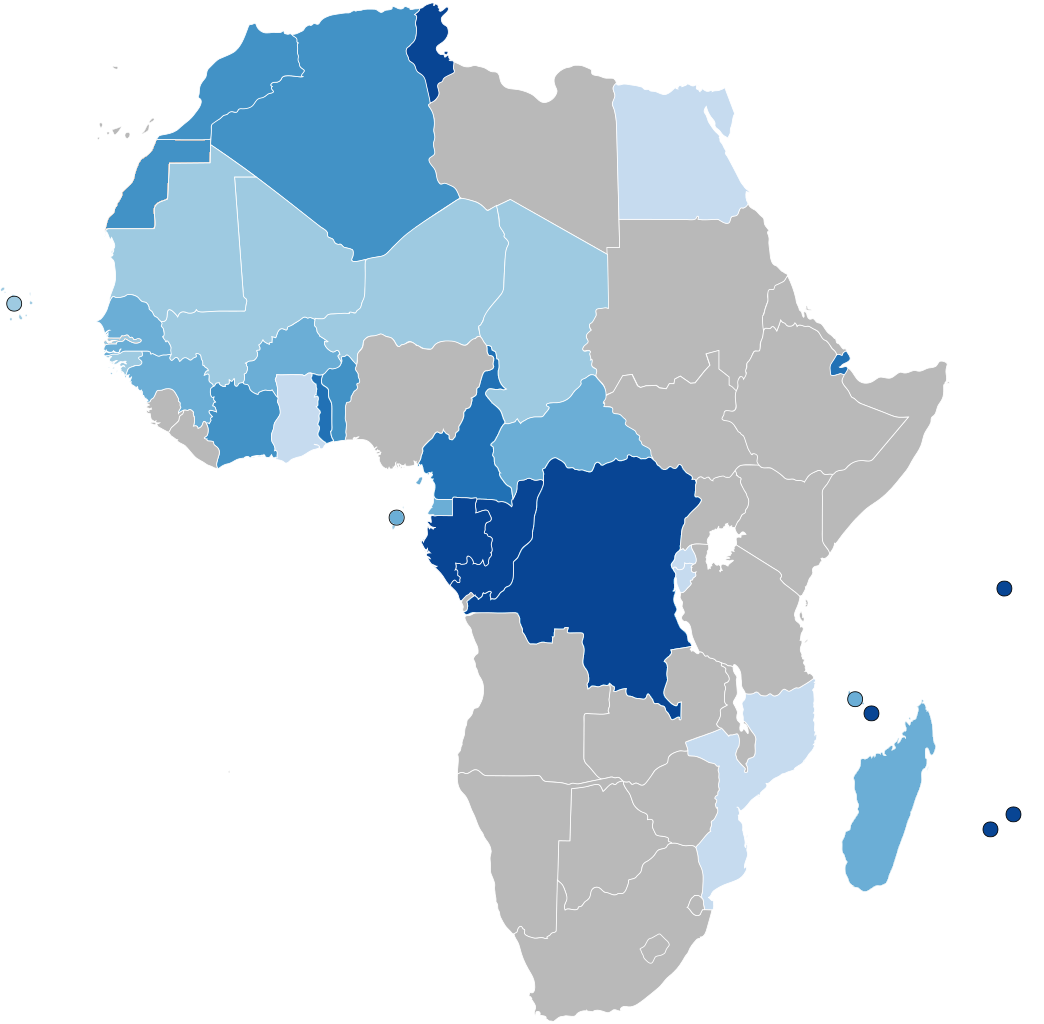
Countries of Africa by percentage of French speakers in 2023 0–10% Francophone 11–20% Francophone 21–30% Francophone 31–40% Francophone 41–50% Francophone >50% Francophone

The majority of the world's French-speaking population lives in Africa; while it is an official language in 18 countries, it is not spoken as a first language by the majority, acting mainly as a second one or a lingua franca due to the many indigenous languages spoken in the territories. According to a 2023 estimate from the Organisation internationale de la Francophonie, an estimated 167 million African people spread across 35 countries and territories (Note: 29 full members of the Organisation internationale de la Francophonie (OIF): Benin, Burkina Faso, Burundi, Cameroon, Cape Verde, Central African Republic, Chad, Comoros, DR Congo, Republic of the Congo, Côte d'Ivoire, Djibouti, Egypt, Equatorial Guinea, Gabon, Guinea, Guinea-Bissau, Madagascar, Mali, Mauritania, Mauritius, Morocco, Niger, Rwanda, São Tomé and Príncipe, Senegal, Seychelles, Togo, and Tunisia. One associate member of the OIF: Ghana. Two observers of the OIF: Gambia and Mozambique. One country not member or observer of the OIF: Algeria. Two French territories in Africa: Réunion and Mayotte.) can speak French as either a first or a second language; only 1.2 million of these spoke it as a first language according to Ethnologue. This number does not include the people living in non-Francophone African countries who have learned French as a foreign language. There is not a single African French, but multiple forms that diverged through contact with various indigenous African languages. Language and slang from francophone Africa, particularly as popularized through music, are playing a growing role in influencing French across the francophone world.

While spoken mainly as a second language, French is increasingly being spoken as a native language in Francophone Africa among some communities in urban areas or the elite class. This is especially true in the cities of Abidjan, Kinshasa, and Lubumbashi, Douala, Libreville, Antananarivo, Cotonou, and Brazzaville. However, in contrast to Central Africa and most of West Africa where French had been entrenched, countries in North Africa and the Sahel have generally distanced themselves from the language due to colonial connections. For example, Algeria intermittently attempted to remove the use of French in favor of a strong native language (see Arabization), and French was removed as an official language in Mali, Burkina Faso, and Niger in 2023, 2024, and 2025, respectively. Despite these changes and the emergence of English as a global lingua franca, French today remains a major language in the Sahel and the societies of Morocco, Algeria and Tunisia.

Due to the rise of French in Africa, the total French-speaking population worldwide is expected to reach 700 million people in 2050. French was the fastest growing language on the continent (in terms of either official or foreign languages). Sub-Saharan Africa is the region where the French language is most likely to expand, because of the expansion of education and rapid population growth. It is also where the language has evolved the most in recent years. Some vernacular forms of French in Africa can be difficult to understand for French speakers from other countries, but written forms of the language are very closely related to those of the rest of the French-speaking world.

=== Americas ===
==== Canada ====
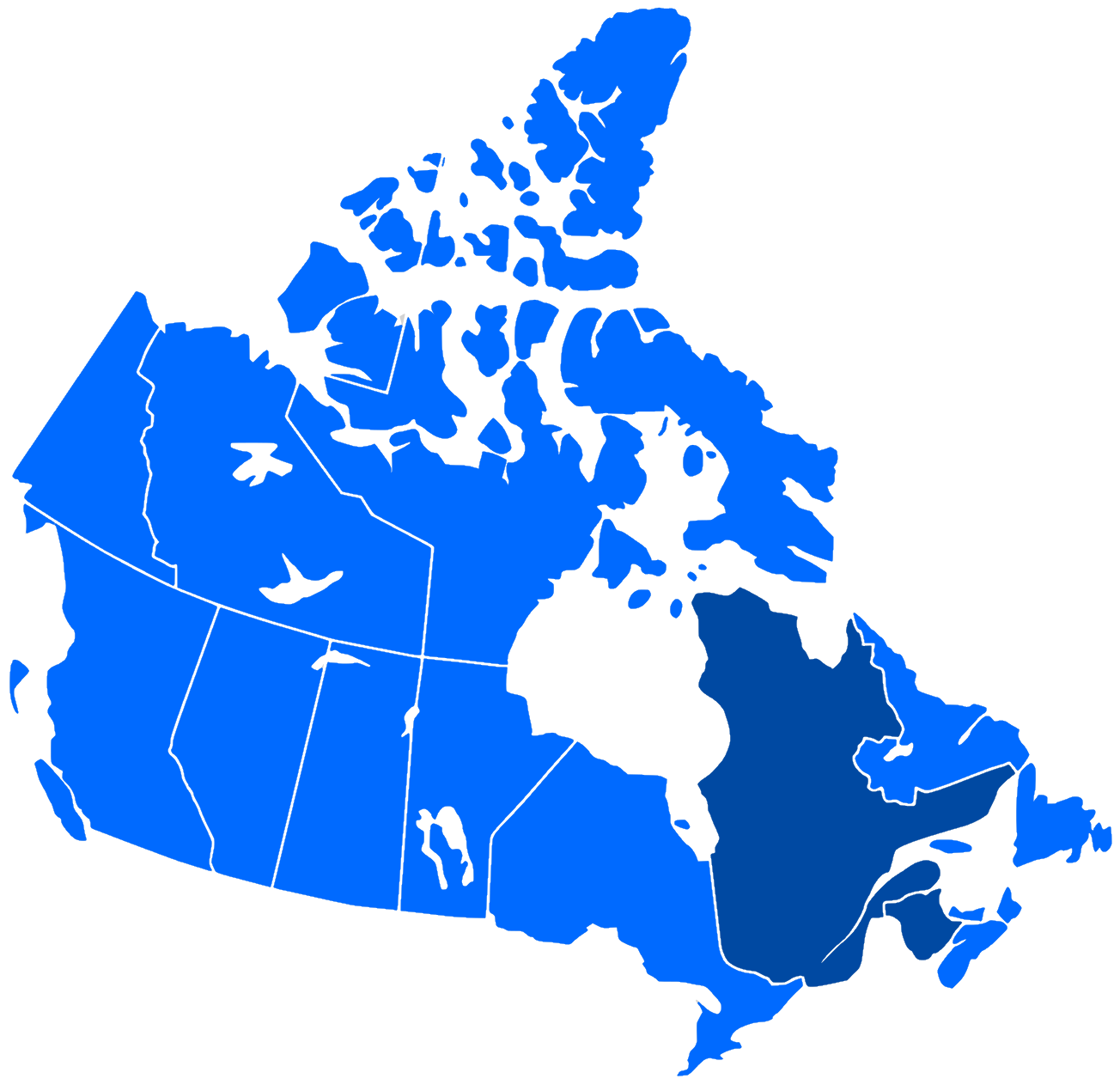
French language distribution in Canada
Regions where French is the main language and an official language at both the federal and provincial level
Regions where French is an official language at the federal level but not a majority native language or an official language at the provincial level

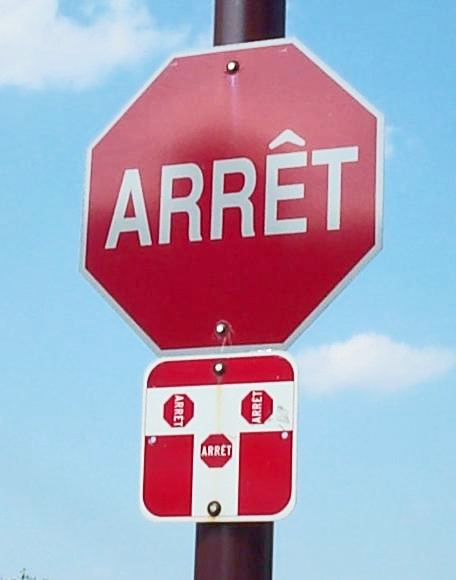
The "arrêt" signs (French for "stop") are used in the Canadian province of Québec, while the English stop, which is also a valid French word, is used in France and other French-speaking countries and regions.

French is the second most commonly spoken language in Canada and one of two federal official languages alongside English. As of the 2021 Canadian census, it was the native language of 7.7 million people (21% of the population) and the second language of 2.9 million (8% of the population). Although French is spoken throughout Canada, it is mostly present in Quebec, with significant Francophone populations also being found in New Brunswick, especially the region of Acadia, and parts of Northern and Eastern Ontario.

French is the sole official language in the province of Quebec, where some 80% of the population speak it as a native language and 95% are capable of conducting a conversation in it. Quebec is also home to the city of Montreal, which is the world's fourth-largest French-speaking city, by number of first language speakers. New Brunswick and Manitoba are the only officially bilingual provinces, though full bilingualism is enacted only in New Brunswick, where about one third of the population is Francophone. French is also an official language of all of the territories (Northwest Territories, Nunavut, and Yukon). Out of the three, Yukon has the most French speakers, making up just under 4% of the population. Furthermore, while French is not an official language in Ontario, the French Language Services Act ensures that provincial services are available in the language. The Act applies to areas of the province where there are significant Francophone communities, namely Eastern Ontario and Northern Ontario. Elsewhere, sizable French-speaking minorities are found in southern Manitoba, Nova Scotia, Prince Edward Island and the Port au Port Peninsula in Newfoundland and Labrador, where the unique Newfoundland French dialect was historically spoken. Smaller pockets of French speakers exist in all other provinces. The Ontarian city of Ottawa, the Canadian capital, is also effectively bilingual, as it has a large population of federal government workers, who are required to offer services in both French and English, and is just across the river from the Quebecois city of Gatineau.

==== United States ====
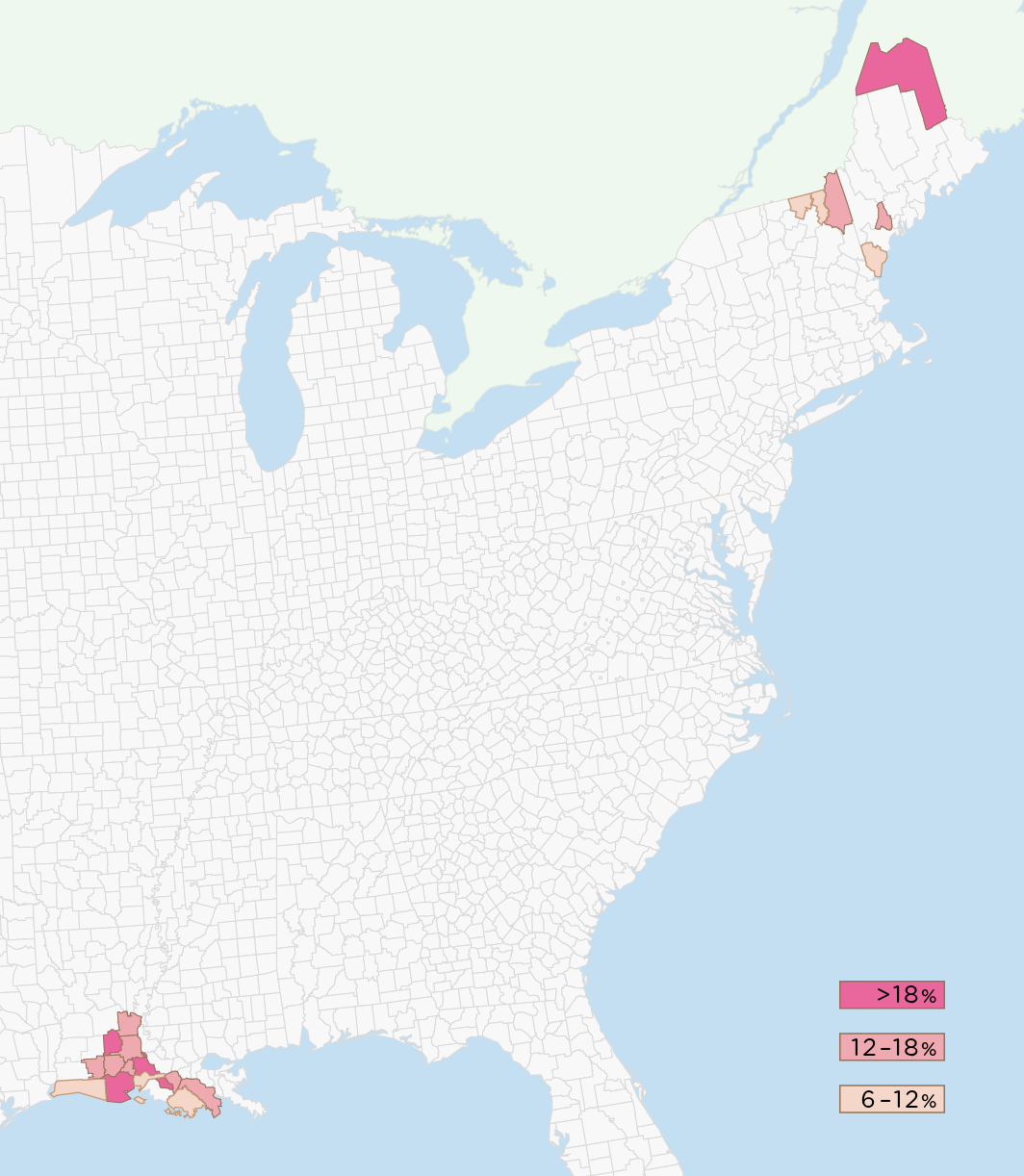
French language spread in the United States. Counties marked in lighter pink are those where 6–12% of the population speaks French at home; medium pink, 12–18%; darker pink, over 18%. French-based creole languages are not included.

According to the United States Census Bureau (2011), French is the fourth most spoken language in the United States after English, Spanish, and Chinese, when all forms of French are considered together and all forms of Chinese are similarly combined. French is the second-most spoken language (after English) in the states of Maine and Vermont. In Louisiana, it is tied with Spanish for second-most spoken if Louisiana French and all creoles such as Haitian are included. French is the third most spoken language (after English and Spanish) in the states of Connecticut, Rhode Island, and New Hampshire. Louisiana is home to many distinct French dialects, collectively known as Louisiana French. New England French, essentially a variant of Canadian French, is spoken in parts of New England. Missouri French was historically spoken in Missouri and Illinois (formerly known as Upper Louisiana), but is nearly extinct today. French also survived in isolated pockets along the Gulf Coast of what was previously French Lower Louisiana, such as Mon Louis Island, Alabama and DeLisle, Mississippi (the latter only being discovered by linguists in the 1990s) but these varieties are severely endangered or presumed extinct. In 2024–2025, Louisiana has around 4,300 pupils enrolled in 32 French immersion schools, and nearly 22,800 learners of French as a foreign language.

==== Caribbean ====
French is one of two official languages in Haiti alongside Haitian Creole. It is the principal language of education, administration, business, and public signage and is spoken by all educated Haitians. It is also used for ceremonial events such as weddings, graduations, and church masses. The vast majority of the population speaks Haitian Creole as their first language; the rest largely speak French as a first language. As a French Creole language, Haitian Creole draws the large majority of its vocabulary from French, with influences from West African languages, as well as several European languages. It is closely related to Louisiana Creole and the creole from the Lesser Antilles.

French is the sole official language of all the overseas territories of France in the Caribbean that are collectively referred to as the French West Indies, namely Guadeloupe, Saint Barthélemy, Saint Martin, and Martinique.

In some countries, French-based creole languages are spoken, namely Dominica, Grenada, and Saint Lucia, but these are slightly intelligible with standard French.

==== Other territories ====
French is the official language of both French Guiana on the South American continent, and of Saint Pierre and Miquelon, an archipelago off the coast of Newfoundland in North America.

=== Asia ===
==== Southeast Asia ====
French was the official language of the colony of French Indochina, comprising modern-day Vietnam, Laos, and Cambodia. All three countries are full members of Organisation internationale de la Francophonie (OIF) with Cambodia hosting the 20th Sommet de la Francophonie in 2026. French continues to be an administrative language in Laos and Cambodia, although its usage in all three countries has waned significantly since the colonial period. In 2025, there were about 712,000 speakers in Vietnam, 400,000 in Cambodia, and 215,000 in Laos. All three countries have francophone education, including though the OIF assisted Teacher Mobility Program and institutions within the Agency for French Education Abroad. In Cambodia approximately 400,000 students were learning French followed by Loas with approximately 75,000 students. Several francophone cultural and media institutions serve the region such as the several Alliance Francaise offices and French Chamber of Commerce in Cambodia.

==== Lebanon ====
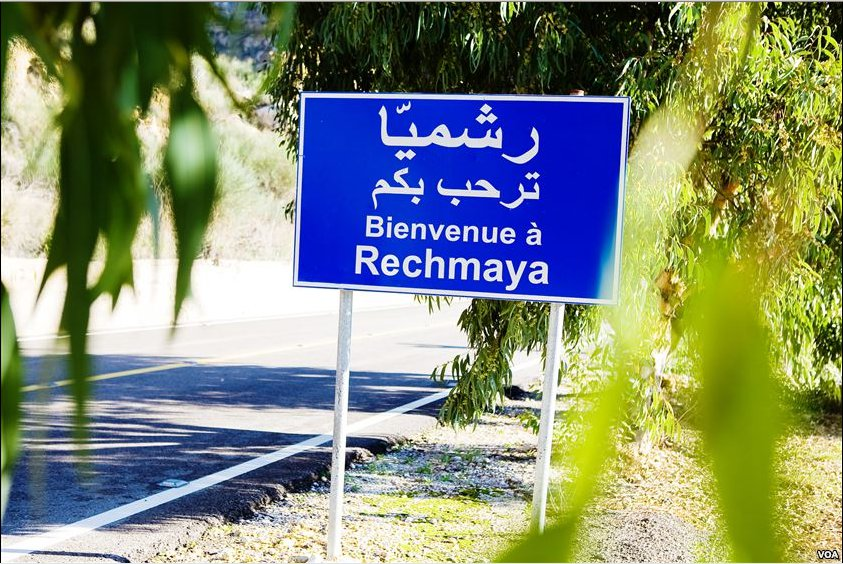
Town sign in Standard Arabic and French at the entrance of Rechmaya in Lebanon

A former French mandate, Lebanon designates Arabic as the sole official language, while a special law regulates cases when French can be publicly used. Article 11 of Lebanon's Constitution states that "Arabic is the official national language. A law determines the cases in which the French language is to be used". The French language in Lebanon is a widespread second language among the Lebanese people, and is taught in many schools along with Arabic and English. French is used on Lebanese pound banknotes, on road signs, on Lebanese license plates, and on official buildings (alongside Arabic).

Today, French and English are secondary languages of Lebanon, with about 40% of the population being Francophone and 40% Anglophone. The use of English is growing in the business and media environment. Out of about 900,000 students, about 500,000 are enrolled in Francophone schools, public or private, in which the teaching of mathematics and scientific subjects is provided in French. Actual usage of French varies depending on the region and social status. One-third of high school students educated in French go on to pursue higher education in English-speaking institutions. English is the language of business and communication, with French being an element of social distinction, chosen for its emotional value.

==== India ====
French was the official language of French India, consisting of the geographically separate enclaves referred to as Puducherry. It continued to be an official language of the territory even after its cession to India in 1956 until 1965. A small number of older locals still retain knowledge of the language, although it has now given way to Tamil and English.

=== Oceania ===
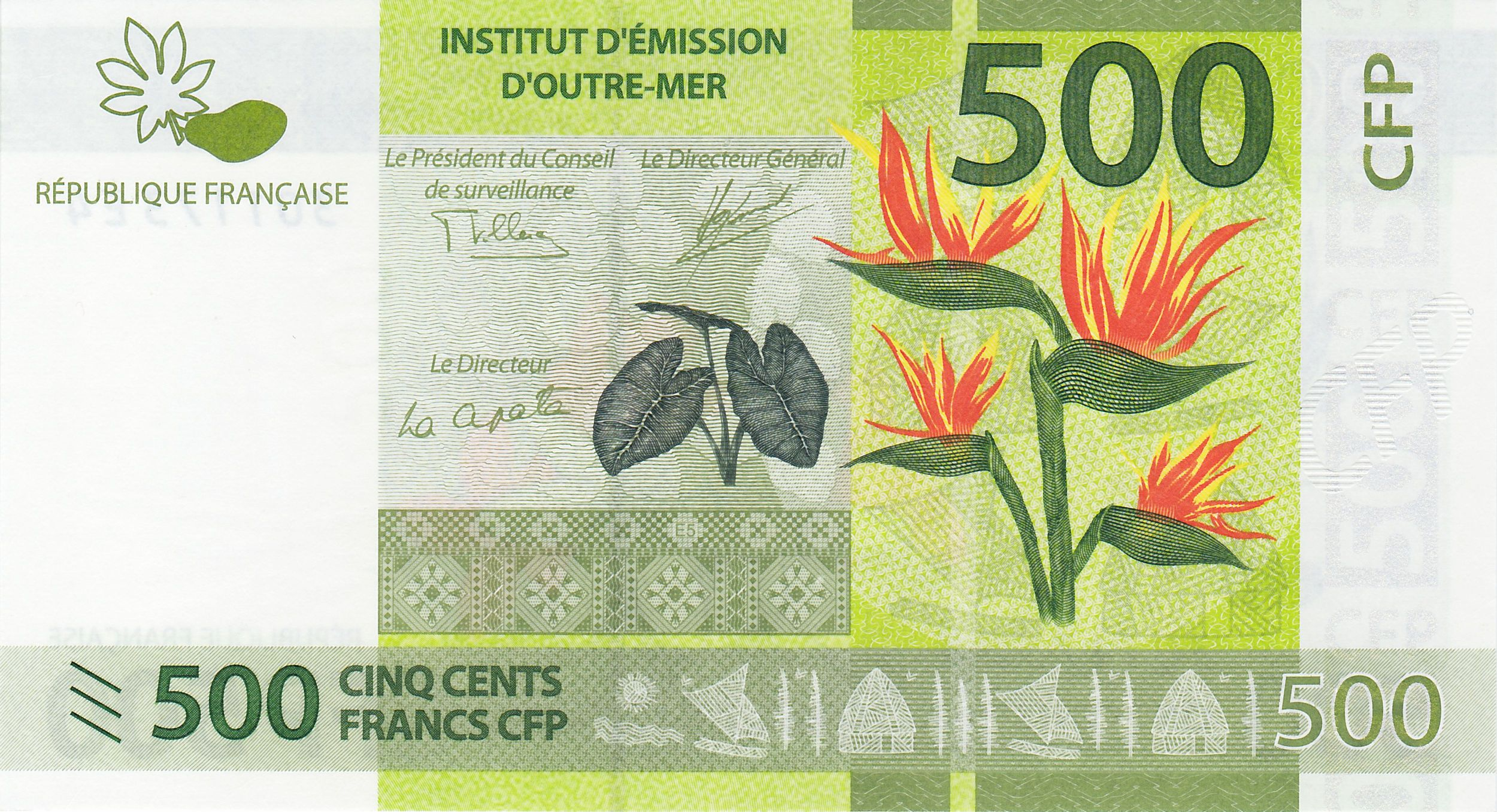
A 500-CFP franc (€4.20; US$5.00) banknote, used in French Polynesia, New Caledonia and Wallis and Futuna

French is an official language of the Pacific Island nation of Vanuatu, where 31% of the population was estimated to speak it in 2023. It is the sole official language in the French special collectivity of New Caledonia and the overseas collectivities of Wallis and Futuna and French Polynesia.

In New Caledonia, 97% of the population can speak, read and write French while in French Polynesia this figure is 95%, and in Wallis and Futuna, it is 84%. In French Polynesia and to a lesser extent Wallis and Futuna, where oral and written knowledge of the French language has become almost universal, French increasingly tends to displace the native Polynesian languages as the language most spoken at home. In French Polynesia, the percentage of the population who reported that French was the language they use the most at home rose from 67% at the 2007 census to 74% at the 2017 census. In Wallis and Futuna, the percentage of the population who reported that French was the language they use the most at home rose from 10% at the 2008 census to 13% at the 2018 census.

== Varieties ==
- African French
  - Maghreb French (North African French)
- Aostan French
- Belgian French
- Cambodian French
- Canadian French
  - Acadian French
  - Newfoundland French
  - New England French
  - Ontario French
  - Quebec French
- French French
  - Guianese French
  - Meridional French
- Haitian French
- Indian French
- Jersey Legal French
- Lao French
- Louisiana French
  - Cajun French
- Missouri French
- South East Asian French
- Swiss French
- Vietnamese French
- West Indian French

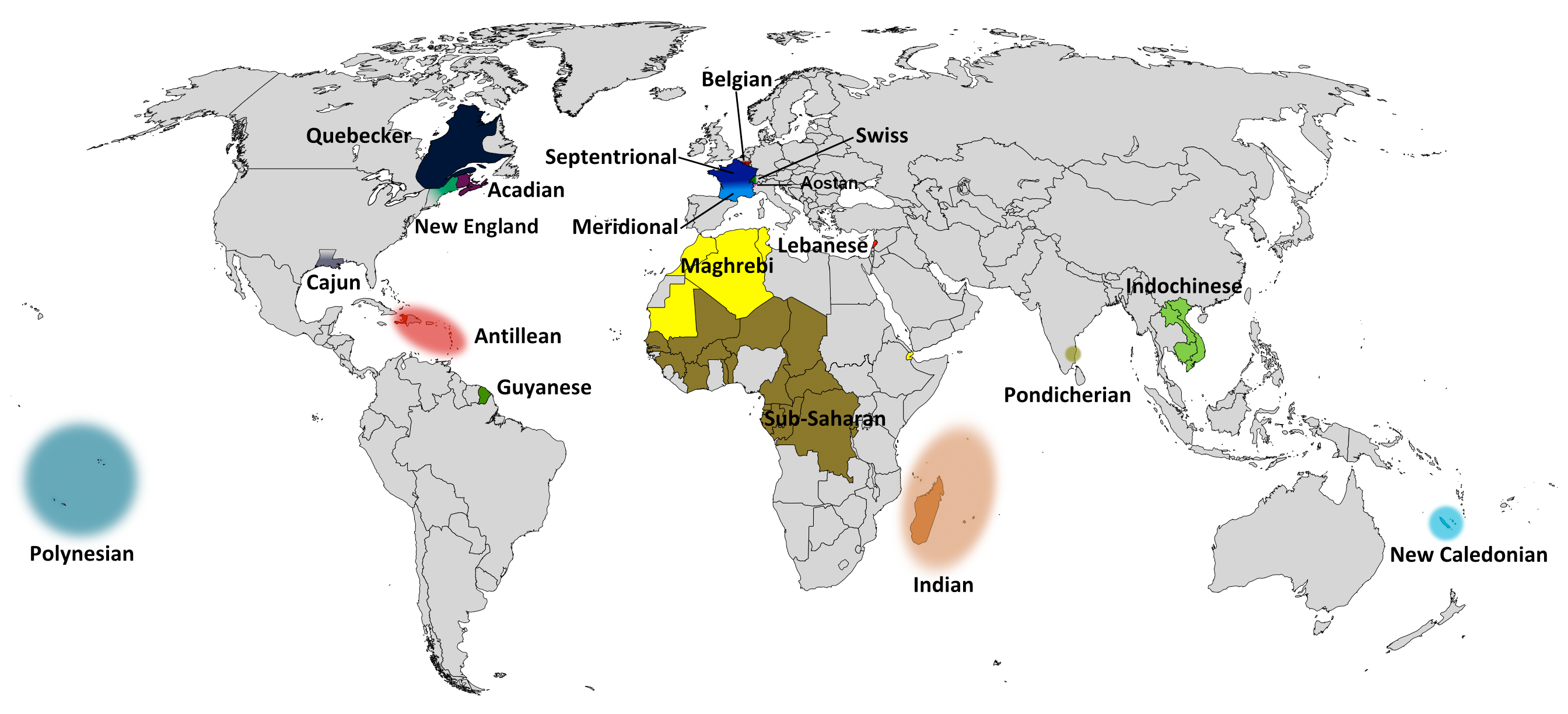
Varieties of the French language in the world

== Current status and importance ==
According to the OIF, approximately 321 million people worldwide are "able to speak the language" as of 2022, without specifying the criteria for this estimation or whom it encompasses. French is regarded as an influential world language because of its wide use in the worlds of journalism, jurisprudence, education, and diplomacy, though its use, geography, and sociopolitical context continues to shift with declines in some areas, including academia, and growth in others. Given the demographic prospects of the French-speaking nations of Africa, researcher Pascal-Emmanuel Gobry wrote in 2014 that French "could be the language of the future"; despite this growth in parts of Central and West Africa, where it had been entrenched as an official, administrative and educational language in numerous states, countries in North Africa and the Sahel have generally distanced themselves from the language due to colonial connections: some countries such as Algeria intermittently attempted to eradicate the use of French, and it was removed as an official language in Mali, Burkina Faso and Niger in 2023, 2024, and 2025, respectively. Its use is also largely declined in parts of Asia, particularly in former French colonies such as Vietnam, Laos, and Cambodia, where it has been replaced by local languages and English in both public life and education.

In diplomacy, French is one of the six official languages of the United Nations (and one of the UN Secretariat's only two working languages), one of twenty official and three procedural languages of the European Union, an official language of NATO, the International Olympic Committee, the Council of Europe, the Organisation for Economic Co-operation and Development, Organization of American States (alongside Spanish, Portuguese and English), the Eurovision Song Contest, one of eighteen official languages of the European Space Agency, World Trade Organization and the least used of the three official languages in the North American Free Trade Agreement countries. It is also a working language in nonprofit organisations such as the Red Cross (alongside English, German, Spanish, Portuguese, Arabic and Russian), Amnesty International (alongside 32 other languages of which English is the most used, followed by Spanish, Portuguese, German, and Italian), Médecins sans Frontières (used alongside English, Spanish, Portuguese and Arabic), and Médecins du Monde (used alongside English).

Significant as a judicial language, French is one of the official languages of such major international and regional courts, tribunals, and dispute-settlement bodies as the African Court on Human and Peoples' Rights, the Caribbean Court of Justice, the Court of Justice for the Economic Community of West African States, the Inter-American Court of Human Rights, the International Court of Justice, the International Criminal Tribunal for the former Yugoslavia, International Criminal Tribunal for Rwanda, the International Tribunal for the Law of the Sea the International Criminal Court and the World Trade Organization Appellate Body. It is the sole internal working language of the Court of Justice of the European Union, and makes with English the European Court of Human Rights's two working languages.

In the European Union, French was the dominant language within all institutions until the 1990s. After several enlargements of the EU (1995, 2004), French significantly lost ground in favour of English, which is more widely spoken and taught in most EU countries. French currently remains one of the three working languages, or "procedural languages", of the EU, along with English and German. It is the second-most widely used language within EU institutions after English, but remains the preferred language of certain institutions or administrations such as the Court of Justice of the European Union, where it is the sole internal working language, or the Directorate-General for Agriculture. Since 2016, Brexit has rekindled discussions on whether or not French should again hold greater role within the institutions of the European Union.

In 1997, George Weber published, in Language Today, a comprehensive academic study entitled "The World's 10 most influential languages". In the article, Weber ranked French as, after English, the second-most influential language of the world, ahead of Spanish. His criteria were the numbers of native speakers, the number of secondary speakers (especially high for French among fellow world languages), the number of countries using the language and their respective populations, the economic power of the countries using the language, the number of major areas in which the language is used, and the linguistic prestige associated with the mastery of the language (Weber highlighted that French in particular enjoys considerable linguistic prestige). In a 2008 reassessment of his article, Weber concluded that his findings were still correct since "the situation among the top ten remains unchanged."

Knowledge of French is often considered to be a useful skill by business owners in the United Kingdom; a 2014 study found that 50% of British managers considered French to be a valuable asset for their business, thus ranking French as the most sought-after foreign language there, ahead of German (49%) and Spanish (44%). MIT economist Albert Saiz calculated a 2.3% premium for those who have French as a foreign language in the workplace.

In 2011, Bloomberg Businessweek ranked French the third most useful language for business, after English and Standard Mandarin Chinese.

== Phonology ==
Spoken French (Africa)

Consonant phonemes in French
		Labial	Dental/ Alveolar	Palatal (-alveolar)	Dorsal
Nasal		m	n	ɲ	(ŋ)
Stop	voiceless	p	t		k
Stop	voiced	b	d		ɡ
Fricative	voiceless	f	s	ʃ	ʁ
Fricative	voiced	v	z	ʒ	ʁ
Approximant	plain		l	j	ʁ
Approximant	labialized			ɥ	w

Vowel phonemes in French

Oral
	Front		Central	Back
	unrounded	rounded	Central	Back
Close	i	y		u
Close-mid	e	ø	ə	o
Open-mid	ɛ, (ɛː)	œ	ə	ɔ
Open	a			(ɑ)

Nasal
	Front		Back
	unrounded	rounded	Back
Open-mid	ɛ̃	(œ̃)	ɔ̃
Open			ɑ̃

Although there are many French regional accents, foreign learners normally use only one variety of the language.

- There are a maximum of 17 vowels in French, not all of which are used in every dialect: /a/, /ɑ/, /e/, /ɛ/, /ɛː/, /ə/, /i/, /o/, /ɔ/, /y/, /u/, /œ/, /ø/, plus the nasalized vowels /ɑ̃/, /ɛ̃/, /ɔ̃/ and /œ̃/. In France, the vowels /ɑ/, /ɛː/ and /œ̃/ are tending to be replaced by /a/, /ɛ/ and /ɛ̃/ in many people's speech, but the distinction of /ɛ̃/ and /œ̃/ is present in Meridional French. In Quebec and Belgian French, the vowels /ɑ/, /ə/, /ɛː/ and /œ̃/ are present.
- Voiced stops (i.e., /b, d, ɡ/) are typically produced fully voiced throughout.
- Voiceless stops (i.e., /p, t, k/) are unaspirated.
- The velar nasal /ŋ/ can occur in final position in borrowed (usually English) words: parking, camping, swing.
- The palatal nasal /ɲ/, which is written ⟨gn⟩, can occur in word initial position (e.g., gnon), but it is most frequently found in intervocalic, onset position or word-finally (e.g., montagne).
- French has three pairs of homorganic fricatives distinguished by voicing, i.e., labiodental /f/~/v/, dental /s/~/z/, and palato-alveolar /ʃ/~/ʒ/. /s/~/z/ are dental, like the plosives /t/~/d/ and the nasal /n/.
- French has one rhotic whose pronunciation varies considerably among speakers and phonetic contexts. In general, it is described as a voiced uvular fricative, as in [ʁu] roue, "wheel". Vowels are often lengthened before this segment. It can be reduced to an approximant, particularly in final position (e.g., fort), or reduced to zero in some word-final positions. For other speakers, a uvular trill is also common, and an apical trill [r] occurs in some dialects. The cluster /ʁw/ is generally pronounced as a labialised voiced uvular fricative [ʁʷ], such as in [ʁʷa] roi, "king", or [kʁʷaʁ] croire, "to believe".
- Lateral and central approximants: The lateral approximant /l/ is unvelarised in both onset (lire) and coda position (il). In the onset, the central approximants [w], [ɥ], and [j] each correspond to a high vowel, /u/, /y/, and /i/ respectively. There are a few minimal pairs where the approximant and corresponding vowel contrast, but there are also many cases where they are in free variation. Contrasts between /j/ and /i/ occur in final position as in /pɛj/ paye, "pay", vs. /pɛi/ pays, "country".
- The lateral approximant /l/ can be delateralised when word- or morpheme-final and preceded by /i/, such as in /tʁavaj/ travail, "work", or when a word ending in ⟨al⟩ is pluralised, giving ⟨aux⟩ /o/.

French pronunciation follows strict rules based on spelling, but French spelling is often based more on history than phonology. The rules for pronunciation vary between dialects, but the standard rules are:

- Final single consonants, in particular s, x, z, t, d, n, p and g, are normally silent. (A consonant is considered "final" when no vowel follows it even if one or more consonants follow it.) The final letters f, k, q, and l, however, are normally pronounced. The final c is sometimes pronounced, as in bac, sac, roc, but can also be silent, as in blanc or estomac. The final r is usually silent when it follows an e in a word of two or more syllables, but it is pronounced in some words (hiver, super, cancer etc.).
  - When the following word begins with a vowel, however, a silent consonant may once again be pronounced, to provide a liaison or "link" between the two words. Some liaisons are mandatory, for example the s in les amants or vous avez; some are optional, depending on dialect and register, for example, the first s in deux cents euros or euros irlandais; and some are forbidden, for example, the s in beaucoup d'hommes aiment. The t of et is never pronounced and the silent final consonant of a noun is only pronounced in the plural and in set phrases like pied-à-terre.
  - Doubling a final n and adding a silent e at the end of a word (e.g., chien → chienne) makes it clearly pronounced. Doubling a final l and adding a silent e (e.g., gentil → gentille) adds a [j] sound if the l is preceded by the letter i.
- Some monosyllabic function words ending in a or e, such as je and que, drop their final vowel when placed before a word that begins with a vowel sound (thus avoiding a hiatus). The missing vowel is replaced by an apostrophe. (e.g., *je ai is instead pronounced and spelled j'ai). This gives, for example, the same pronunciation for l'homme qu'il a vu ("the man whom he saw") and l'homme qui l'a vu ("the man who saw him"). However, in Belgian French the sentences are pronounced differently; in the first sentence the syllable break is as "qu'il-a", while the second breaks as "qui-l'a". It can also be noted that, in Quebec French, the second example (l'homme qui l'a vu) has more emphasis on l'a vu.

== Writing system ==
=== Alphabet ===
French is written in the Latin script. The French alphabet has 26 letters. Standard French orthography also uses the acute accent, grave accent, circumflex, diaeresis (tréma), and cedilla. Accented letters and ç are not separate letters of the alphabet. Diacritics are retained on capital letters in standard French typography.

The orthographic ligatures ⟨œ⟩ and ⟨æ⟩ occur in conventional spellings. ⟨œ⟩ is common in words such as cœur, sœur, œuf, œuvre and œil, whereas ⟨æ⟩ is much rarer and is found chiefly in learned words and Latin expressions such as ex æquo. Legacy French AZERTY layouts often lacked direct access to these and other characters required for fully correct French typography; this is a keyboard limitation rather than a rule of French spelling. The voluntary French keyboard standard NF Z71-300, published by AFNOR in 2019, was designed in part to remedy such limitations.

=== Orthography ===
French orthography is alphabetic but relatively deep. It represents not only phonological information but also morphological, grammatical, lexical and historical distinctions. In the influential analysis of Nina Catach, the French writing system combines a phonographic component with morphographic and other non-phonographic information. Estimates depend on how graphemes and phonemes are counted, but recent descriptions commonly give about 130 graphemes for roughly three dozen phonemes.

The system is considerably more predictable in the direction from spelling to pronunciation than from pronunciation to spelling. A phoneme may have several possible spellings, and many written letters have no independent pronunciation. For example, inflectional morphology is frequently visible in writing but not in speech: the plural -s in amis and many verbal endings are normally silent, while homophonous verbal endings can have different spellings. Morphological knowledge therefore contributes substantially to French spelling, including the spelling of otherwise silent letters.

Historical sound change is another source of mismatch between spelling and pronunciation. In addition, some spellings were deliberately reshaped to reflect etymology. For example, modern doigt 'finger' descends from Latin digitus; the g in the modern spelling is part of an etymological reshaping of older French forms such as doi and doit.

Many word-final consonant letters are silent, but this is not a general rule that is suspended whenever the next word begins with a vowel. Some final consonants are pronounced in all contexts, while others are latent and may surface in liaison. Liaison is a morphophonological process that occurs only in particular syntactic and lexical contexts before a vowel-initial word; depending on the context, it can be obligatory, optional or prohibited. Thus forms such as les amis and beaux-arts contain liaison [z], but a following vowel does not automatically cause every silent final consonant to be pronounced.

French uses numerous multiletter graphemes, such as ⟨ou⟩, ⟨au⟩, ⟨eau⟩, ⟨ch⟩ and vowel–nasal-consonant sequences. Sequences of a vowel followed by ⟨n⟩ or ⟨m⟩ often represent a nasal vowel when the nasal consonant is word-final or followed by another consonant; before a following vowel or a doubled nasal consonant, the vowel is commonly oral and the nasal consonant is pronounced. There are lexical and morphological exceptions, so this is a spelling tendency rather than a complete rule.

Orthographic double consonants do not normally represent phonemic consonant length in contemporary French. Surface lengthening can nevertheless occur in particular morphological, lexical or prosodic environments; it should not be described as a straightforward spelling-to-sound rule.

==== Diacritics ====
The acute accent occurs in native French principally on ⟨é⟩ and normally indicates a close-mid front vowel, /e/. The grave accent on ⟨è⟩ normally indicates an open-mid front vowel, /ɛ/. It is misleading, however, to describe these values simply as alternatives to a 'default' /ə/ for unaccented ⟨e⟩, because unaccented ⟨e⟩ has several possible phonological values and may also be silent.

The circumflex has several functions rather than a single phonetic or etymological one. Depending on the word and variety of French, it can correlate with a difference in vowel quality, distinguish otherwise identical written forms (for example sur and sûr, du and dû), mark particular verbal forms, or reflect the history of the spelling. The familiar association of the circumflex with a lost ⟨s⟩, as in forêt beside older forest, is real but not systematic. The 1990 orthographic rectifications retained the circumflex on ⟨a⟩, ⟨e⟩ and ⟨o⟩, while making it optional on most occurrences of ⟨i⟩ and ⟨u⟩, with exceptions where it marks grammatical or semantic distinctions.

The diaeresis or tréma indicates that a letter is to receive a separate phonetic interpretation rather than being absorbed into an adjacent multiletter spelling, as in naïf, Noël and maïs. Under the 1990 rectifications, the tréma is placed on the pronounced vowel in forms such as aigüe, ambigüe and cigüe, and is used in forms such as argüer to prevent a misleading pronunciation. Traditional spellings such as aiguë remain in use.

The cedilla in ⟨ç⟩ indicates /s/ before ⟨a⟩, ⟨o⟩ or ⟨u⟩, where plain ⟨c⟩ would normally represent /k/; compare France ~ français and placer ~ plaçons. Before ⟨e⟩, ⟨i⟩ and ⟨y⟩, plain ⟨c⟩ normally already represents /s/, so a cedilla is not required. The cedilla is retained on capital ⟨Ç⟩.

The grave accent on ⟨à⟩ and ⟨ù⟩ does not ordinarily mark a different pronunciation; it primarily distinguishes homographs, as in a 'has' versus à 'to/at' and ou 'or' versus où 'where'. The long lists of rare ⟨ÿ⟩, ⟨ö⟩ and foreign-name examples are better treated in the dedicated article on the French alphabet rather than in a summary of the writing system.

==== Historical plural ⟨x⟩ ====
The ⟨x⟩ in plurals such as chevaux is a historical spelling development, not a direct continuation of a Latin plural ending. In medieval French, ⟨l⟩ before plural ⟨s⟩ was vocalized, so forms such as chevals developed into chevaus. Scribes commonly represented the final sequence ⟨us⟩ by an abbreviation resembling ⟨x⟩; the abbreviation was later interpreted as the letter ⟨x⟩, while ⟨u⟩ was restored in writing, producing the modern spelling chevaux.

=== Rectifications of 1990 ===
In 1990 the Superior Council of the French Language proposed a set of orthographic rectifications, approved by the Académie française and published in the Journal officiel. They concern such matters as hyphenation and word joining, the plurals of compounds and loanwords, accents and the diaeresis, some verbs in -eler and -eter, the past participle of laisser before an infinitive, and a number of isolated anomalies. The Académie presents the rectifications as recommendations rather than as a compulsory replacement of traditional spelling; traditional and rectified spellings therefore coexist in present-day usage.

The rectifications were not a new reform introduced in 2016. A 2015 French national curriculum explicitly stated that its texts applied the 1990 rectifications, which helped generate renewed public attention the following year. The French and mathematics sections of that 2015 cycle-3 programme were replaced by a new programme in 2025 (with staged implementation in 2025–2027), so the 2016 schoolbook episode should not be used as a timeless description of current curriculum policy.

== Grammar ==
French is a moderately inflected language. Nouns and most pronouns are inflected for number (singular or plural, though in most nouns the plural is pronounced the same as the singular even if spelled differently); adjectives, for number and gender (masculine or feminine) of their nouns; personal pronouns and a few other pronouns, for person, number, gender, and case; and verbs, for tense, aspect, mood, and the person and number of their subjects. Case is primarily marked using word order and prepositions, while certain verb features are marked using auxiliary verbs. According to the French lexicogrammatical system, French has a rank-scale hierarchy with clause as the top rank, which is followed by group rank, word rank, and morpheme rank. A French clause is made up of groups, groups are made up of words, and lastly, words are made up of morphemes.

French grammar shares several notable features with most other Romance languages, including

- the loss of Latin declensions
- the loss of the neuter gender
- the development of grammatical articles from Latin demonstratives
- the loss of certain Latin tenses and the creation of new tenses from auxiliaries.

=== Nouns ===
Every French noun is either masculine or feminine. Because French nouns are not inflected for gender, a noun's form cannot specify its gender. For nouns regarding the living, their grammatical genders often correspond to that which they refer to. For example, a male teacher is an enseignant while a female teacher is an enseignante. However, plural nouns that refer to a group that includes both masculine and feminine entities are always masculine. So a group of two male teachers would be enseignants. A group of two male teachers and two female teachers would still be enseignants. However, a group of two female teachers would be enseignantes. In many situations, including in the case of enseignant, both the singular and plural form of a noun are pronounced identically. The article used for singular nouns is different from that used for plural nouns and the article provides a distinguishing factor between the two in speech. For example, the singular le professeur or la professeure (the male or female teacher, professor) can be distinguished from the plural les professeur(e)s because le /lə/, la /la/, and les /le(s)/ are all pronounced differently.

With enseignant, however, for both singular forms the le/la becomes l', and so the only difference in pronunciation is that the ⟨t⟩ on the end of masculine form is silent, whereas it is pronounced in the feminine. If the word was to be followed by a word starting with a vowel, then liaison would cause the ⟨t⟩ to be pronounced in both forms, resulting in identical pronunciation. There are also some situations where both the feminine and masculine form of a noun are the same and the article provides the only difference. For example, le dentiste refers to a male dentist while la dentiste refers to a female dentist. Furthermore, a few nouns' meanings depend on their gender. For example, un livre (masculine) refers to a book, while une livre a (feminine) is a pound.

=== Verbs ===
==== Moods and tense-aspect forms ====
The French language consists of both finite and non-finite moods. The finite moods include the indicative mood (indicatif), the subjunctive mood (subjonctif), the imperative mood (impératif), and the conditional mood (conditionnel). The non-finite moods include the infinitive mood (infinitif), the present participle (participe présent), and the past participle (participe passé).

===== Finite moods =====
====== Indicative (indicatif) ======
The indicative mood makes use of eight tense-aspect forms. These include the present (présent), the simple past (passé composé and passé simple), the past imperfective (imparfait), the pluperfect (plus-que-parfait), the simple future (futur simple), the future perfect (futur antérieur), and the past perfect (passé antérieur). Some forms are less commonly used today. In today's spoken French, the passé composé is used while the passé simple is reserved for formal situations or for literary purposes. Similarly, the plus-que-parfait is used for speaking rather than the older passé antérieur seen in literary works.

Within the indicative mood, the passé composé, plus-que-parfait, futur antérieur, and passé antérieur all use auxiliary verbs in their forms.

Indicatif
	Présent		Imparfait		Passé composé		Passé simple	
	Singular	Plural	Singular	Plural	Singular	Plural	Singular	Plural
1st person	j'aime	nous aimons	j'aimais	nous aimions	j'ai aimé	nous avons aimé	j'aimai	nous aimâmes
2nd person	tu aimes	vous aimez	tu aimais	vous aimiez	tu as aimé	vous avez aimé	tu aimas	vous aimâtes
3rd person	il/elle aime	ils/elles aiment	il/elle aimait	ils/elles aimaient	il/elle a aimé	ils/elles ont aimé	il/elle aima	ils/elles aimèrent
	Futur simple		Futur antérieur		Plus-que-parfait		Passé antérieur	
	Singular	Plural	Singular	Plural	Singular	Plural	Singular	Plural
1st person	j'aimerai	nous aimerons	j'aurai aimé	nous aurons aimé	j'avais aimé	nous avions aimé	j'eus aimé	nous eûmes aimé
2nd person	tu aimeras	vous aimerez	tu auras aimé	vous aurez aimé	tu avais aimé	vous aviez aimé	tu eus aimé	vous eûtes aimé
3rd person	il/elle aimera	ils/elles aimeront	il/elle aura aimé	ils/elles auront aimé	il/elle avait aimé	ils/elles avaient aimé	il/elle eut aimé	ils/elles eurent aimé

====== Subjunctive (subjonctif) ======
The subjunctive mood only includes four of the tense-aspect forms found in the indicative: present (présent), simple past (passé composé), past imperfective (imparfait), and pluperfect (plus-que-parfait).

Within the subjunctive mood, the passé composé and plus-que-parfait use auxiliary verbs in their forms.

Subjonctif
	Présent		Imparfait		Passé composé		Plus-que-parfait	
	Singular	Plural	Singular	Plural	Singular	Plural	Singular	Plural
1st person	j'aime	nous aimions	j'aimasse	nous aimassions	j'aie aimé	nous ayons aimé	j'eusse aimé	nous eussions aimé
2nd person	tu aimes	vous aimiez	tu aimasses	vous aimassiez	tu aies aimé	vous ayez aimé	tu eusses aimé	vous eussiez aimé
3rd person	il/elle aime	ils/elles aiment	il/elle aimât	ils/elles aimassent	il/elle ait aimé	ils/elles aient aimé	il/elle eût aimé	ils/elles eussent aimé

====== Imperative (imperatif) ======
The imperative is used in the present tense (with the exception of a few instances where it is used in the perfect tense). The imperative is used to give commands to you (tu), we/us (nous), and plural you (vous).

Imperatif
	Présent	
	Singular	Plural
1st person		aimons
2nd person	aime	aimez

====== Conditional (conditionnel) ======
The conditional makes use of the present (présent) and the past (passé).

The passé uses auxiliary verbs in its forms.

Conditionnel
	Présent		Passé	
	Singular	Plural	Singular	Plural
1st person	j'aimerais	nous aimerions	j'aurais aimé	nous aurions aimé
2nd person	tu aimerais	vous aimeriez	tu aurais aimé	vous auriez aimé
3rd person	il/elle aimerait	ils/elles aimeraient	il/elle aurait aimé	ils/elles auraient aimé

==== Voice ====
French uses both the active voice and the passive voice. The active voice is unmarked while the passive voice is formed by using a form of verb être ("to be") and the past participle.

Example of the active voice:

- "Elle aime le chien." She loves the dog.
- "Marc a conduit la voiture." Marc drove the car.

Example of the passive voice:

- "Le chien est aimé par elle." The dog is loved by her.
- "La voiture a été conduite par Marc." The car was driven by Marc.

However, unless the subject of the sentence is specified, generally the pronoun on "one" is used:

- "On aime le chien." The dog is loved. (Literally "one loves the dog.")
- "On conduit la voiture." The car is (being) driven. (Literally "one drives the car.")

Word order is subject–verb–object although a pronoun object precedes the verb. Some types of sentences allow for or require different word orders, in particular inversion of the subject and verb, as in "Parlez-vous français ?" when asking a question rather than "Vous parlez français ?" Both formulations are used, and carry a rising inflection on the last word. The literal English translations are "Do you speak French?" and "You speak French?", respectively. To avoid inversion while asking a question, "Est-ce que" (literally "is it that") may be placed at the beginning of the sentence. "Parlez-vous français ?" may become "Est-ce que vous parlez français ?" French also uses verb–object–subject (VOS) and object–subject–verb (OSV) word order. OSV word order is not used often and VOS is reserved for formal writings.

== Vocabulary ==
Root languages of loanwords
1. English (25.1%)
2. Other Germanic languages (20.6%)
3. Italian (16.8%)
4. Other Romance languages (15.3%)
5. Celtic (3.81%)
6. Persian and Sanskrit (2.67%)
7. Native American (2.41%)
8. Other Asian languages (2.12%)
9. Afro-Asiatic (6.45%)
10. Balto-Slavic (1.31%)
11. Basque (0.24%)
12. Other languages (3.43%)

The majority of French words derive from Vulgar Latin or were constructed from Latin or Greek roots. In many cases, a single etymological root appears in French in a "popular" or native form, inherited from Vulgar Latin, and a learned form, borrowed later from Classical Latin. The following pairs consist of a native noun and a learned adjective:

- brother: frère / fraternel from Latin frater / fraternalis
- finger: doigt / digital from Latin digitus / digitalis
- faith: foi / fidèle from Latin fides / fidelis
- eye: œil / oculaire from Latin oculus / ocularis

More recently (1994) the linguistic policy (Toubon Law) of the French language academies of France and Quebec has been to provide French equivalents to (mainly English) imported words, either by using existing vocabulary, extending its meaning or deriving a new word according to French morphological rules. The result is often two (or more) co-existing terms for describing the same phenomenon.

- mercatique / marketing
- finance fantôme / shadow banking
- bloc-notes / notepad
- ailière / wingsuit
- tiers-lieu / coworking

It is estimated that 12% (4,200) of common French words found in a typical dictionary such as the Petit Larousse or Micro-Robert Plus (35,000 words) are of foreign origin (where Greek and Latin learned words are not seen as foreign). About 25% (1,054) of these foreign words come from English and are fairly recent borrowings. The others are some 707 words from Italian, 550 from ancient Germanic languages, 481 from other Gallo-Romance languages, 215 from Arabic, 164 from German, 160 from Celtic languages, 159 from Spanish, 153 from Dutch, 112 from Persian and Sanskrit, 101 from Native American languages, 89 from other Asian languages, 56 from other Afro-Asiatic languages, 55 from Balto-Slavic languages, 10 from Basque and 144 (about 3%) from other languages.

One study analyzing the similarity of seven Romance languages to Vulgar Latin in terms of accent vocalization estimated that among the languages analyzed, French was the most differentiated language from Vulgar Latin in this respect. The French language's lexical similarity to a selection of other Romance languages is 89% with Italian, 80% with Sardinian, 78% with Rhaeto-Romance, and 75% with Romanian, Spanish and Portuguese.

=== Numerals ===
The numeral system used in the majority of Francophone countries employs both decimal and vigesimal counting. After the use of unique names for the numbers 1–16, those from 17 to 69 are counted by tens, while twenty (vingt) is used as a base number in the names of numbers from 70 to 99. The French word for 80 is quatre-vingts, literally "four twenties", and the word for 75 is soixante-quinze, literally "sixty-fifteen". The vigesimal method of counting is analogous to the archaic English use of score, as in "fourscore and seven" (87), or "threescore and ten" (70).

Belgian, Swiss, and Aostan French as well as that used in the Democratic Republic of the Congo, Rwanda and Burundi, use different names for 70 and 90, namely septante and nonante. In Switzerland, depending on the local dialect, 80 can be quatre-vingts (Geneva, Neuchâtel, Jura) or huitante (Vaud, Valais, Fribourg). The Aosta Valley similarly uses huitante for 80. Conversely, Belgium and in its former African colonies use quatre-vingts for 80.

In Old French (during the Middle Ages), all numbers from 30 to 99 could be said in either base 10 or base 20, e.g. vint et doze (twenty and twelve) for 32, dous vinz et diz (two twenties and ten) for 50, uitante for 80, or nonante for 90.

The term octante was historically used in Switzerland for 80, but is now considered archaic.

French, like most European languages, uses a space to separate thousands. The comma (French: virgule) is used in French numbers as a decimal point, i.e. "2,5" instead of "2.5". In the case of currencies, the currency markers are substituted for decimal point, i.e. "5$7" for "5 dollars and 7 cents".

== Example text ==
Article 1 of the Universal Declaration of Human Rights in French:

Tous les êtres humains naissent libres et égaux en dignité et en droits. Ils sont doués de raison et de conscience et doivent agir les uns envers les autres dans un esprit de fraternité.

Article 1 of the Universal Declaration of Human Rights in English:

All human beings are born free and equal in dignity and rights. They are endowed with reason and conscience and should act towards one another in a spirit of brotherhood.

== See also ==
- Alliance Française – International network for the promotion of the French language and culture
- AZERTY – Keyboard layout used for French
- Français fondamental – Simplified version of French
- Francization – Expansion of the French language
- Francophile – Strong interest in or love of French people, culture, and history
- Francophobia – Hostility towards French people
- Francophonie – French-speaking world
- French language in Canada
- French language in the United States
- French poetry – Poetry written in French
- Influence of French on English
  - Glossary of French words and expressions in English
- Official bilingualism in Canada
- Varieties of French

=== Lists ===
- List of countries where French is an official language
- List of English words of French origin
- List of French loanwords in Persian
- List of French words and phrases used by English speakers
- List of German words of French origin
