= Nina Catach =

French linguist and historian (1923–1997)

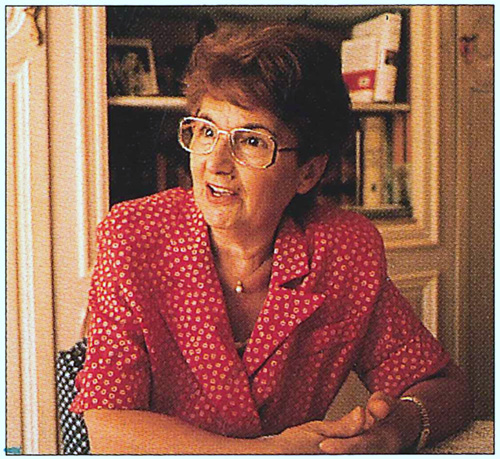
A portrait of Nina Catach

Nina Catach (25 Jul 1923–25 Oct 1997) was a French linguist and linguistic historian who specialized in the history of French orthography. She worked at the CNRS (Centre national de la recherche scientifique) and published several influential books on orthography and on spelling reform.

== Biography ==
She founded the HESO research group at the CNRS (Centre national de la recherche scientifique) in 1962, dedicated to the history and structure of French spelling, a field she devoted her career to. She also founded the Association for Information and Research on Spelling and Writing Systems (AIROÉ). She earned a doctorate in linguistics in 1968, with a thesis entitled, L'orthographe française à l'époque de la Renaissance.

Among her most notable works are L'orthographe française (1980), Orthographe et lexicographie (1981), and LesListes orthographiques de base du français (1984), published with Nathan, as well as Dictionnaire historique de l'orthographe française (1994), published with Larousse, a comprehensive dictionary indicating spelling variations in French from the 16th century, the result of thirty years of research. She also authored Les Délires de l'orthographe (1989) with Plon and contributed to the Que sais-je? series with L'Orthographe (1978) and La Ponctuation (1994), published by Presses Universitaires de France (PUF).

Catach was part of the expert committee that proposed and successfully implemented orthographic reforms in France in 1990, supported by Prime Minister Michel Rocard and approved by the Académie française. She championed a deeply humanistic approach to language, believing that spelling should not be a cause of discrimination or academic failure. Her work remains a reference in French language education across the Francophonie.

== Honors ==
In 1995 Catach was awarded the médaille de vermeil by the Académie française for her work on the Dictionnaire historique de l’orthographe française.

A Festschrift honoring Catach was published by Honoré Champion in 2001.

== Personal ==
Catach was born on 25 July 1923 in Cairo, Egypt.

Catach's daughter, Irène Rosier-Catach, is a linguist and philosopher, while her son, Laurent Catach, is an editor and linguist, responsible for digital editions of Dictionnaires Le Robert and the Dictionnaire de l'Académie française.

Catach died on 25 October 1997 in Paris, France. She is buried at the Père Lachaise cemetery.

== Selected works ==
- L'orthographe française, Nathan, 1980
- Orthographe et lexicographie, Nathan, 1981
- Les listes orthographiques de base du français, Nathan, 1984
- New linguistic approaches to a theory of writing. In: Battestini, S.P.X. (ed.) Georgetown University Round Table on Languages and Linguistics 1986. Washington, DC: Georgetown University Press (1986), pp. 161–174.
- Dictionnaire historique de l'orthographe française, Larousse, 1994
- La Ponctuation, PUF, 1994. ISBN 213046050X
