= Dictionnaires Le Robert =

French publisher of dictionaries

- Parent company: Editis
- Founded: 1951; 75 years ago
- Founder: Paul Robert
- Country of origin: France
- Headquarters location: Paris
- Key people: Charles Bimbenet
- Official website: www.lerobert.com

Dictionnaires Le Robert (pronounced [diksjɔnɛːʁ lə ʁɔbɛʁ]) is a French publisher of dictionaries founded by Paul Robert. Its Petit Robert is often considered one of the authoritative single-volume dictionary of the French language.

The founding members of the editorial board were the lexicographers, Alain Rey and Josette Rey-Debove.

== Bilingual dictionaries ==
Dictionnaires Le Robert also publishes a series of bilingual dictionaries, including English–French and German–French dictionaries, in collaboration with HarperCollins, Italian–French dictionaries, in collaboration with Zanichelli, and Dutch–French dictionaries, in collaboration with Van Dale.
