= Metaplasm =

Alteration in the pronunciation or the orthography of a word

A metaplasm is almost any kind of alteration, whether intentional or not, in the pronunciation or the orthography of a word. The change may be phonetic only, such as pronouncing Mississippi as Missippi in English, or acceptance of a new word structure, such as the transformation from calidus in Latin to caldo (hot) in Italian. Orthographic metaplasms have been used in philosophy to advance humanity's conceptual terrain, such as when Derrida adapted Heidegger's Destruktion into deconstruction or the French term différence into différance. Changes at either level may or may not be recognized in standard spelling, depending on the orthographic traditions of the language in question. Originally the term referred to techniques used in Ancient Greek and Latin poetry, or processes in those languages' grammar.

== Sound change ==
Many phonological changes found frequently in the natural development of languages are metaplasms:

- Epenthesis, addition of a sound to a word:
  - beginning of a word (prothesis)
  - end (paragoge)
- Synalepha, two syllables becoming one, occurs by elision, crasis, synaeresis, or synizesis.
  - Elision ("contraction" in English grammar), removal of a sound:
    - beginning of a word (apheresis)
    - middle (syncope)
    - end (apocope).
  - Crasis (Ancient Greek contraction), coalescence of two vowels into a new long vowel.
  - Synaeresis, pronunciation of two vowels as a diphthong. Opposite: diaeresis, pronunciation of a diphthong as two syllabic vowels.
  - Synizesis, pronunciation of two vowels that do not form a normal diphthong as one syllable, without change in writing. Opposite: hiatus, distinct pronunciation of two adjacent vowels.
- Metathesis, rearranging of sounds or features of sounds, may affect vowel lengths (quantitative metathesis).

== Rhetoric ==
In rhetoric, metaplasm is the modification of word order for emphasis.

== Romance languages ==
In the grammar of the Romance languages, metaplasm may refer to change in the grammatical gender of nouns from their original gender in Latin.

== See also ==
- Sound change
