= Synaeresis =

Phonological process of sound change

In linguistics, synaeresis (/sɪˈnɛrəsɪs/; also spelled syneresis) is a phonological process of sound change in which two adjacent vowels within a word are combined into a single syllable.

The opposite process, in which two adjacent vowels are pronounced separately, is known as "diaeresis".

For any given word, speakers generally hold a traditional view about the standard pronunciation of that word. When realized in a careful reading style, each particular word is associated with this single, standard phonetic form. However, each word also possesses multiple non-standard or reduced phonetic forms which are produced in a greater range of contexts. These multiple variations in the pronunciation of a single word are referred to as allophonic variants. To classify one of these other forms as an allophonic variant of a word means that pronouncing the word in this way will not change the intended meaning of the word.

Synaeresis is one of various phonological processes in which segments of words or phrases are lost. The general term for a loss of sound segments in the field of linguistics is known as "elision". Other types of elision include the processes of apheresis, syncope, apocope, synizesis, and synaloepha.

== Etymology ==
Synaeresis comes from Greek συναίρεσις (synaíresis), a "contraction", a "taking or drawing together", from συναιρέω (synairéō), "(I) contract", "(I) grasp or seize together", derived from σύν, "with", and αἱρέω, "(I) grasp, seize". Semantically, it is easy to understand how this term evolved historically. The term eventually became applied to a process in which vowels are taken or drawn together.

== English ==
Synaeresis often occurs with reduced vowels in English, as in Asia (/ˈeɪziə/ → /ˈeɪʒə/) and Sebastian (/sɪˈbæstiən/ → /sɪˈbæstʃən/).

== French ==
Synaeresis is a common process in French. For example, the French word louer, which means ‘to praise,’ is typically pronounced as [lwe] according to transcriptions using the International Phonetic Alphabet. That pronunciation reduces the [u] vowel to a [w], or a glide sound, when pronounced in conjunction with the [e] vowel sound. In this example, the standard pronunciation uses the process of synaeresis to compress both of the original vowel sounds into one syllable. However, when speakers are asked to produce this word in a more controlled situation, in a careful reading style, French speakers often produce extended forms or different allophonic variants for the word. These forms of the word include [lue] according to IPA transcriptions, in which the two vowels are pronounced separately using the process of diaeresis.

== Greek ==
=== Ancient Greek ===
In Ancient Greek, synaeresis (Note: Note on terminology: In ancient books in Greek, vowel contraction in general, including synaeresis and crasis, is often called crasis or is analysed into various classes using related terms.) is the merging and pronunciation of two separate vowels as a diphthong (e.g. α + ι → αι /ai̮/) or a long vowel (e.g. ο + ο → ου /ο:/); a characteristic example of this is the conjugation class or classes of contracted verbs (Ancient Greek: συνῃρημένα – or περισπώμενα – ῥήματα). Diaeresis, on the other hand, is the separation of a diphthong into two vowels (αϊ /a.i/).

Certain words in Proto-Indo-European had two vowels separated by the consonant s or y (esu "good"). In Greek, this consonant changed to h (ehu), and was lost between vowels (eu). In Homer, the two vowels were sometimes pronounced separately (diaeresis: ἐΰ) and sometimes together (synaeresis: εὖ). Later in Attic Greek, they were always pronounced together.

In Greek synaeresis, two vowels merge to form a long version of one of the two vowels (e.g. e + a → ā), a diphthong with a different main vowel (e.g. a + ei → āi), or a new vowel intermediate between the originals (e.g. a + o → ō). Contraction of e + o or o + e leads to ou, and e + e to ei, which are in this case spurious diphthongs.

In general, the accent after contraction copies the accent before contraction. Often this means circumflex accent. But for nouns, the accent follows the nominative singular. Sometimes this means a different accent from the uncontracted form — i.e., whenever the ending has a long vowel.

Contraction in Greek occurs throughout the present and imperfect of contracted verbs and in the future of other verbs. There are three categories based on the vowel of contraction: a, e, or o.

==== Verbs ====
a-contract:
"honor"

τιμάω	→	τιμῶ
τιμάεις	→	τιμᾷς
τιμάει	→	τιμᾷ
τιμάομεν	→	τιμῶμεν
τιμάετε	→	τιμᾶτε
τιμάουσι	→	τιμῶσι

e-contract:
"love"

φιλέω	→	φιλῶ
φιλέεις	→	φιλεῖς
φιλέει	→	φιλεῖ
φιλέομεν	→	φιλοῦμεν
φιλέετε	→	φιλεῖτε
φιλέουσι	→	φιλοῦσι

o-contract:
"think right"

ἀξιόω	→	ἀξιῶ
ἀξιόεις	→	αξιοῖς
ἀξιόει	→	ἀξιοῖ
ἀξιόομεν	→	ἀξιοῦμεν
ἀξιόετε	→	ἀξιοῦτε
ἀξιόουσι	→	ἀξιοῦσι

==== Nouns ====
Contraction also occurs in nouns, including the contracted second declension.

"bone"
singular

ὀστέον	→	ὀστοῦν
ὀστέου	→	ὀστοῦ
ὀστέῳ	→	ὀστῷ

plural

ὀστέα	→	ὀστᾶ
ὀστέων	→	ὀστῶν
ὀστέοις	→	ὀστοῖς

S-stem nouns undergo contraction with vowel endings.

-es stem

γένος		no contraction
γένεος	→	γένους
γένεϊ	→	γένει
γένεα	→	γένη
γενέων	→	γενῶν
γένεσσι		no contraction

-os stem

αἰδώς		no contraction
αἰδόος	→	αἰδοῦς
αἰδόϊ	→	αἰδοῖ
αἰδόα	→	αἰδῶ

Some compound nouns show contraction:

- λειτο-εργίᾱ → λειτουργίᾱ "liturgy"

=== Modern Greek ===
In Modern Greek, where original diphthongs are pronounced as monophthongs, synaeresis is the pronunciation of two vowel sounds as a monophthong, and diaeresis is the pronunciation of the two vowels as a diphthong (αϊ /ai̮/).

== See also ==
- Diaeresis
- Metaplasm
  - Synalepha
    - Crasis
    - Elision
      - Contraction
    - Synizesis
- Smoothing (phonetics)
