= Synalepha =

Merging of two syllables into one

A synalepha or synaloepha /ˌsɪnəˈliːfə/ is the merging of two syllables into one, especially when it causes two words to be pronounced as one.

The original meaning in Ancient Greek is more general than modern usage and includes coalescence of vowels within a word. Similarly, synalepha most often refers to elision (as in English contraction), but it can also refer to coalescence by other metaplasms: synizesis, synaeresis or crasis.

== Examples ==
Spanish, Portuguese and Italian use synalepha, which is important in counting syllables in poetry. An example is in this hendecasyllable (11-syllable line) by Garcilaso de la Vega:

Los cabellos que al oro oscurecían.

The hair that shadowed the gold.

The words que and al form one syllable in counting them because of synalepha. The same thing happens with -ro and os- and so the line has eleven syllables (syllable boundaries are shown by a dot):

Los·ca·be·llos·queal·o·roos·cu·re·cí·an.

English verse may have a metrical scheme that relies on synalepha as well. For example, when Milton writes (Paradise Lost III.56):

Now had the Almighty Father from above

the line has ten syllables:

Nōw·hăd·th'Ăl·mīgh·ty̆·Fā·thĕr·frōm·ă·bōve

Likewise, James McHenry's epic The Antediluvians (19th-century, but consciously in imitation of Milton) uses consistently (and without altering the orthography) as part of its metrical scheme synalepha on the word "the" followed by an unstressed vowel:

The astonished multitude fell to the ground
Th'ăs·tōn·ĭshed·mūl·tĭ·tŭde·fēll·tŏ·thĕ·grōund

== See also ==
- Metaplasm
  - Elision—Contraction (grammar)
    - Apheresis (initial)
    - Syncope (medial)
    - Apocope (final)
  - Crasis
  - Synizesis (merge into one syllable without change in writing)
  - Synaeresis—opposite Diaeresis
- Correption
