= Prothesis (linguistics) =

Insertion of a sound at the beginning of a word

In linguistics, prothesis (/ˈprɒθɪsɪs/; from post-classical Latin based on Ancient Greek: πρόθεσις próthesis 'placing before'), or less commonly prosthesis (from Ancient Greek πρόσθεσις prósthesis 'addition'), is the addition of a sound or syllable at the beginning of a word without changing the word's meaning or the rest of its structure. A vowel or consonant added by prothesis is called prothetic or less commonly prosthetic.

Prothesis is different from the adding of a prefix, which changes the meaning of a word.

Prothesis is a metaplasm, a change in spelling or pronunciation. The opposite process, the loss of a sound from the beginning of a word, is called apheresis or aphesis.

== Word formation ==
Prothesis may occur during word formation from borrowing from foreign languages or the derivation from protolanguages.

=== Romance languages ===
An example is that /s/ + stop clusters (known as s impurum), in Latin, gained a preceding /e/ in early Romance languages (Old Spanish, Old French, Galician-Portuguese).

Thus, Latin status changed to Spanish estado and French état, été (in which the s was later lost) "state" / "been", and Latin speciālis changed to Spanish and Old French especial (Modern French spécial and Italian speciale).

=== Basque ===
No word in Basque starts with the group "s" + consonant: as a result of that, an initial vowel, mainly "e-", sometimes "i-", is placed before, like Latin spiritus becoming espiritu or izpiritu, English slogan becoming eslogan... However, in more recent loanwords, no such vowels are added, like in strip-tease, stradivarius, Stalin, which retain their initical "s" + consonnant spelling, although most speakers, mainly in Southern dialects, do pronounce a prothetic vowel before.

A similar prothesis used to be placed word-initially before "r-", like in Latin rarus > Basque arraro, "rare"; rēgula > erregela, "rule"; rege(m) > errege, "king"; Россия / Rusia / Russie > Errusia, "Russia"... Still, this does not apply to modern loanwords: Rwanda, REM, rol ("role")... take no prothesis.

Notice that some traditional Basque family names omit that initial prothetic vowel, like Retegi, instead of Erretegi ("grill restaurant"), Rotaeche / Rotaetxe, instead of Errotaetxe ("millhouse", from errota, "mill" —itself from Latin rota, "wheel"—, and etxe, "house"), or Recondo, instead of Errekondo ("next to the broom", from erreka, "broom"—, and ondo, "next to").

=== Turkic languages ===
Some Turkic languages avoid certain combinations of consonants at the beginning of a word. In Turkish, for instance, Smyrna is called İzmir, and the word station, borrowed from French, becomes Turkish istasyon.

Similarly, in Bashkir, a prosthetic vowel is added to Russian loanwords if a consonant or a consonant cluster appears at the beginning: арыш "rye" from Russian рожь, өҫтәл "table" from Russian стол, эскәмйә "bench" from Russian скамья, etc.

However, Bashkir presents cases of novel prothesis in terms that are inherited from Old Turkic: ыласын "falcon" from Old Turkic lačïn, ысыҡ "dew" from Old Turkic čïq.

=== Samoyedic languages ===
In Nenets, Enets and Nganasan, prothesis of a velar nasal [ŋ] before vowels has occurred historically: the Nenets words /ŋuːʔ/ "road", /ŋin/ "bow" are cognate with Hungarian út, íj with the same meaning.

In some varieties of Nenets, the rule remains productive: the initial syllable cannot start with a vowel, and vowel-initial loanwords are adapted with prothetic /ŋ/.

=== Hindi ===
Hindi words from English have an initial i before sp-, sk- or sm-: school → iskuul, special → ispesal, stop → istahp.

=== Persian ===
In Persian, loanwords with an initial sp-, st-, sk- or sm- add a short vowel e at the beginning: spray → esprey, stadium → estadium, Stalin → Estalin, skate → eskeyt, scan → eskan, etc.

=== Slavic languages ===
During their evolution from Proto-Slavic, words in some Slavic languages gained a prothetic /v/ (spelled "w" in Polish).

- Proto-Slavic *okъno ("window") vs. Ukrainian vikno, Belarusian vakno, Common Czech vokno
- Proto-Slavic *ǫtroba ("internal organs") vs. Polish wątroba ("liver")

=== Semitic languages ===
Some Semitic languages, such as Arabic and Hebrew, regularly break up initial two-consonant clusters by adding a prothetic vowel. The vowel may be preceded by the glottal stop /ʔ/ (see aleph) or, in Hebrew, /h/, which may be pronounced or simply written.

Because of the triconsonantal root morphology of Semitic languages, the prothetic vowel may appear regularly when the first two consonants of the root lack an intermediate vowel, such as in verb conjugation: Arabic ʼaktubu (I write) from the verb kataba (root ktb).

In Hebrew, prothesis occurs in nouns of Greek origin, such as Aplaton (Plato), itztadion (stadium).

== Consonant mutation ==
=== Celtic languages ===
Modern Irish features t-prothesis in certain circumstances, such as when a vowel-initial masculine noun in the singular nominative is preceded by the article (e.g. an t-aer 'the air'); or when a feminine noun beginning with s- in the singular nominative is preceded by the article (e.g. an tsúil 'the eye'). Irish also features h-prothesis in certain circumstances, such as when a vowel-initial noun in the nominative plural is preceded by the article (e.g. na héin 'the birds' (masculine), na haoiseanna 'the ages' (feminine)). The feminine singular possessive a 'her' triggers h-prothesis on vowel-initial nouns (e.g. a hathair 'her father' ), while the masculine singular possessive a 'his' does not (e.g. a athair 'his father').

Welsh features h-prothesis only for vowel-initial words. It occurs in words after ei 'her', ein 'our', and eu 'their': oedran 'age' ei hoedran 'her age'. It also occurs with ugain 'twenty' following ar (on) in the traditional counting system: un ar hugain 'twenty-one' (literally, 'one on twenty').

=== Swiss German ===
Swiss German features n-prothesis if a word ends with a vowel and the next word begins with a vowel. A dropped final n was originally retained then, but the process now occurs in contexts in which n never existed. A similar process called intrusive-r occurs in some varieties of English.

== Sandhi ==
A prothetic vowel performs external sandhi in Italian: compare la scuola ("the school") vs. in iscuola ("at school"). It is, therefore, conjectured both that the origins of the Romance prothesis are phonetical, rather than grammatical. Prothesis originally broke consonant clusters if the preceding word ended in a consonant. There was no prothesis in the Romance dialects that had lost their terminal consonants.

== Second language ==
Phonetic rules of a native language may influence the pronunciation of a second language, including various metaplasms. For example, prothesis is reported for Crimean Tatars when they speak Russian.

James L. Barker writes:

"If an Arab, an East Indian, a Frenchman, Spaniard, or Italian is given the following sentence to read: I want to speak Spanish, he reads it in the following manner: I want to speak (i)/(e)Spanish. In this case there is no 'parasitic' i or e before sp of speak, but there is before sp in Spanish".

== See also ==
- Apheresis
- Epenthesis

== Sources ==
- Avram, Andrei A. (2004). "On the status of prothetic vowels in the Atlantic French creoles". Antwerp Papers in Linguistics (pdf) (Report). Archived from the original (PDF) on 2007-06-30 – via ua.ac.be.
