= Synizesis =

Sound change

Synizesis (/ˌsɪnəˈziːsɪs/) is a sound change (metaplasm) in which two originally syllabic vowels (hiatus) are pronounced instead as a single syllable. In poetry, the vowel contraction would often be necessitated by the metrical requirements of the poetic form. Synizesis is also understood to occur as a natural product in the evolution of a language over time.

A tie may be used to represent this pronunciation: dē͡hinc (i.e., deinc).

== Definition ==
Synizesis comes from the Greek συνίζησις (synízēsis, "a sitting together") from σύν (syn, "with") and ἵζω (hizō, "I sit"). The term was used to describe this vowel change as early as the 2nd century CE, by the Alexandrian grammarian, Hephaestion.

Ancient grammarians, such as Hephaestion, defined synizesis broadly as the “σύλληψις” (syllepsis, “a taking together (of sounds)”) of any two syllables. More contemporary scholarship has, however, recognised that, when so constructed, synizesis is given an unjustifiably broad meaning. Synizesis is now confined to describing the fusion of two adjacent syllabic vowels. It may occur within a word, or at the boundary between words.

There is disagreement as to the definition of synizesis in three areas. First, scholars disagree whether synizesis exists when a word’s spelling changes. The initial presumption was that synizesis occasions no change in spelling, but this requirement has been ignored and criticised. Second, though synizesis has been understood as a process of desyllabification, some scholars contend that vowels that have been fused together are not truly monosyllabic. Third, it is unclear whether the deletion of one of the two vowel sounds may be considered synizesis. That is typically described as synalepha or elision. These disagreements come as a result of the fact that languages rarely have a means of distinguishing between hiatic and synizetic pronunciation via their script.

To avoid these definitional inconsistencies, “synecphonesis” has been suggested as an all-encompassing replacement to synizesis, but has not entered popular use.

== Prosody ==
=== Ancient Greek ===
==== Epic Greek ====
The opening line of the Iliad, recited by a classicist to demonstrate synizesis.

Homer, Iliad 1.1:

μῆνιν ἄειδε θεὰ Πηληϊάδε͡ω Ἀχιλῆος
Mênin áeide theā̀ Pēlēïáde͡ō Akhilêos
Sing, goddess, the wrath of Achilles, son of Peleus

There exists synizesis in the ending of “Πηληϊάδεω”, with the -εω final two syllables being condensed into one. This allows the resultant syllable to be read as the long syllable of a dactyl in “-ε͡ω Ἀχι-”. However, beyond merely being necessary to form the dactyl, this synizesis may be a conscious and intentional sound technique. For instance, it has been suggested that the metrical peculiarity and difficult pronunciation of the final two words lend a tension and foreboding to the line.

==== Attic Greek ====
Sophocles, Oedipus at Colonus:

1003	καί σοι τὸ Θησέ͡ως ὄνομα θωπεῦσαι καλόν
	Kaí soi tò Thēsé͡ōs ónoma thōpeûsai kalón
	And to you it seems noble to flatter renowned Theseus
1103	Θησέ͡ως ἔσωσαν φιλτάτων τ᾽ ὀπαόνων
	Thēsé͡ōs ésōsan philtátōn t' opaónōn
	(The arms) of Theseus and his much beloved companions saved us

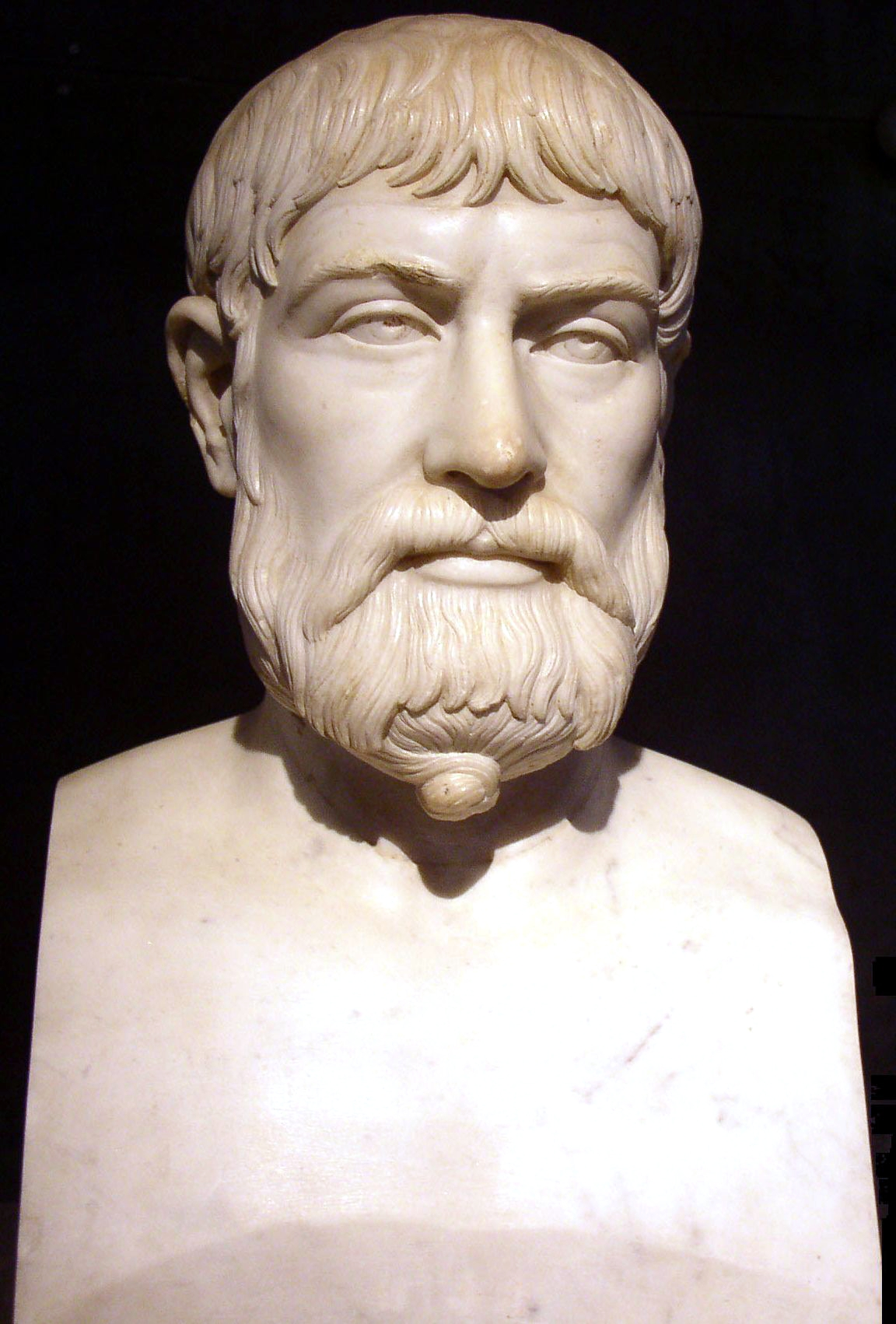
The poetry of Pindar (pictured) does not adhere strictly to uniform rules, making the instances of synizesis in his poetry hard to codify.

Particularly in the prosody of Attic tragedy, patterns have been observed as to the recurrence of synizesis in particular positions. Johannes Rumpel noted that, in iambic trimeter, synizesis frequently occurs at either the arsis (second syllable) of the first foot, or the thesis (first syllable) of the third foot. The word "Θησέως" (Thēséōs, "of Theseus") appears in lines 1003 and 1103 of Sophocles' Oedipus at Colonus, and illustrates Rumpel's findings. His findings have subsequently been affirmed and developed.

There are three notable exceptions to this rule. The first occurs in the case of certain compound words, such as Νεοπτόλεμος (Neoptólemos), occurring in Sophocles and in Euripides, and λεωφόρου (leōfórou, "highway"), occurring in Euripides. Such compound words, despite falling in the theorised categories, do not undergo synizesis, as they do not fit the metre. Second, the word πόλεως (póleōs, "of the city"), is also a notable exception to this rule, as it is more frequently pronounced in synizesis, regardless of the foot in which it falls. This is because the word was commonly pronounced synizetically (that is to say, disyllabically) in everyday speech. Additionally, the hiatic πόλεως is anapaestic ( ˘ ˘ ¯ ), which does not suit iambic trimeter. Third, disyllabic words (that would be made monosyllabic by synizesis), such as θεός (theós, "god") do not follow this rule. θεός was only rarely pronounced monosyllabically until its popularity in Euripides' trimeter.

==== Greek Lyric ====
Synizesis has also been observed in Ancient Greek lyric poetry, and shares similarities with both Epic and Tragic Greek. For example, in Pindar, Nemean Ode VI, ἐπηετατόν (epēetatón, "lasting all through the year") (line 10) undergoes synizesis in "ηε" similar to what occurs in Hesiod. In the Pythian Ode IV of Pindar, line 250 contains the word "Πελιαοφόνον" (Peliaophónon, "killer of Pelias"). Though contractions would ordinarily be frequent with three adjacent vowels, the vowels are pronounced separately here. This is consistent with the observations made of Greek tragedy, that long compound nouns often do not undergo synizesis.

=== Latin ===
Vergil, Aeneid:

1.41	ūnĭus ob nox~~am~~ et furiās Aiācis Oīlē͡ī?
	Because of the guilt and madness of one man, Ajax, son of Oileus?
1.131	Eur~~um~~ ad sē Zephyrumque vocat, dē͡hinc tālia fātur
	He calls the east and west winds to him, and then says...
6.412	dēturbat laxatque forōs; simul accipit alve͡ō
	He threw them down and cleared the gangways; and received on board...

In the first and third examples, the final two vowels undergo synizesis in order to form the anceps at the end of the line. -ei would be pronounced as a diphthong (this diphthong exists ordinarily in Latin, albeit never in a word final position, but for in Greek names as here), and -eo with a glide, giving [jo]. In the second example, a dactylic fifth foot (-cāt dĕhĭnc) is impossible, as de- and -hinc are both long syllables. As such, the only possible construction involves the synizetic reduction of “dehinc”. Note synizesis is still possible here, though the vowels are not adjacent, as the Latin /h/ phoneme was not a strong consonant.

Poetry of the Old Latin period had different conventions for synizesis. In Augustan poetry, the syllable being obscured or suppressed by synizesis was unstressed. For example, in "alveō" ("in the hollow"), the stress lies on the first syllable, and the unstressed second syllable joins with the third in synizesis. However, in Plautine Latin, the syllable suppressed by synizesis was stressed, such as in "meō" ("my"), where the stress lies on the "e". The consequence of this is that no two unstressed syllables may undergo synizesis in old Latin. Plautine synizesis frequently occurs in the case of proclitics and enclitics, minor words which do not naturally demand stress, however also occurs in the case of substantive and emphatic nouns and verbs, such as "deō" ("for god") and "sciō" ("I know"). What has been argued to be important, however, is not the word itself, but its context and function in the sentence. Substantive nouns may yet be subordinate to more important words in the sentence, and as such may be "[unable] to resist slurring".

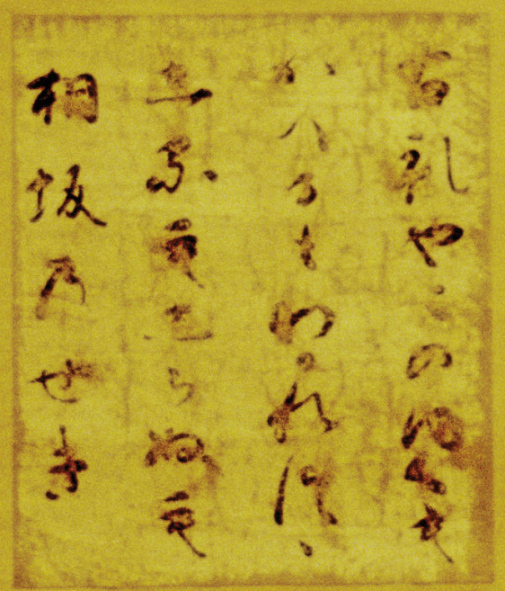
Waka poetry (pictured) has a rich written tradition, but also an oral tradition, making it important to analyse such poems metrically.

=== Japanese ===
Though it has been argued that a Eurocentric approach of analysing Japanese poetry in terms of "lines" and "metre" may be inappropriate, synizesis has nevertheless been understood to occur. While hypermetric (and hypometric) lines occur in various forms of Japanese poetry, a reading which shortens (or lengthens) the line is preferable. This may lead to either elision or synizesis.

Sosei Hōshi, Hyakunin Isshu 21:

今来むと	Ima kon to	You would come anon,
いひしばかりに	Iishi bakari ni	You said, and because you did,
長月の	Nagatsuki no	This September night
有明の月を	Ari͡ake no tsuki o	Sat I up for you, till there
待ち出でつるかな	Machi idetsuru kana	Did I see the moon at dawn

The penultimate line would appear hypermetric in having eight syllables, exceeding the seven syllables accorded to it following the form of waka poetry. Such a line is known as ji-amari. However, if "有明" (ariake, "dawn") is read instead as [arjake] or [arʲake], with the [i] vowel devocalised and pronounced alternatively as a glide, the metre may be maintained. Such a reduction, though not the complete deletion of a vowel (as if 有明 were pronounced [areke]), is sufficient to constitute synizesis.

== In etymology ==
=== Romance languages ===
As classical Latin evolved into vulgar Latin, common synizetic pronunciations began to be reflected in spelling, giving such forms as dende for deinde ("then"), dis for dies ("day") and sa for sua ("your"). This synizetic vowel reduction in order to avoid hiatus continued through to the evolution of the Romance languages. For instance, the Italian derivative of Latin trisyllabic habeo ("I have") is disyllabic abbio, where the final -eo changed to the glide as in /jo/, written as -io. Though such words as oriente ("east") and gloria ("glory") which derive from Latin may once have been pronounced to preserve the hiatic Latinate pronunciation, that is not strictly observed, and synizetic pronunciation is the more popular alternative.

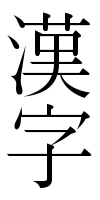
The adoption of kanji ("Chinese characters", pictured) and kango ("Chinese vocabulary") in Japanese fundamentally changed Japanese phonology.

Such synizesis is described as left or right oriented. For instance, after the Latin ego ("I, me") lost its intervocalic “g”, becoming eo, preference was given to the “e” sound in Portuguese, giving monosyllabic eu, while preference was given to the “o” sound in Spanish, giving monosyllabic yo.

=== Japanese ===
Vowel fusion forms an important part of Japanese etymology. A simple example of synizesis can be seen in the etymology of derivatives of the topic marker, は (wa). When placed after the copula で (de), the resultant [dewa] sound developed into [dea], and then underwent synizesis to become [dja] or [dʲa], resulting finally in the colloquial じゃ (ja). A similar process saw ては (te wa) develop to become the colloquial ちゃ (cha).

Whether synizesis occurs in Japanese may depend on numerous factors. For example, words with the disyllabic /au/ sequence evolved differently depending on their origin. Sino-Japanese words with this sequence mostly underwent synizesis: 京 (kyō, "capital city") became monosyllabic /kjoː/ from /kjau/. However, words of native origin with the same sequence did not undergo synizesis, such as 買う (kau, "to buy"). Similar changes occur elsewhere in respect of Sino-Japanese vocabulary, such as with the /eu/ sequence. The /ai/ sequence has remained relatively stable, regardless of word origin, in that it has not been reduced via synizesis. However, particularly in the Tokyo dialect, words with this sequence such as 大概 (taigai, "generally") and 痛い (itai, "painful") have been reduced, giving disyllabic /teːgeː/ and /iteː/ respectively.

== Register ==
In many languages, speakers have displayed an aversion towards hiatus, and as such have grown to favour synizetic pronunciations of vowels. However, hiatus has often inhered in contexts of formal register, in which the more enunciated hiatic pronunciation has retained a sense of formality.

=== Korean ===
Various words in Korean have alternate pronunciations for formal and casual speech. The casual speech forms frequently derive from the formal form, and involve a vocalic syllable coalescing into its neighbour via synizesis. For instance, the more formal form of the word meaning “child,” 아이 (a-i), underwent synizesis in casual speech, becoming 애 (ae). Similarly, the formal word for “man,” 사나이 (sa-na-i), became 사내 (sa-nae), in casual speech. This sound change may also occur at the boundary between noun at particle: for instance trisyllabic 너에게 (neo-e-ge, "to you"), which consists of the pronoun 너 (neo, "you") and the dative particle (ege, "to"), may be pronounced disyllabically, giving [nē.ke].

These distinctions are often observed in verb conjugations, with certain passive verb forms having a formal and informal pronunciation.

=== Greek ===
Synizesis may also be indicative of more casual speech in modern Greek. Greek speakers, especially older speakers, retain some awareness as to whether words would originally be pronounced in synizesis or hiatus, and seek to accurately reflect this when speaking in formal contexts. However, when in informal contexts, not only is this distinction of less importance, but a default to the synizetic pronunciation is occasionally preferred. For example, in colloquial speech, a word such as σχέδια (sxedia, "plans"), correctly pronounced [ˈsçe.ði.a] in hiatus, may be pronounced instead in synizesis, giving [ˈsçe.ðja]. The inverse is also true: the word καθάρια (katharia, "clean"), correctly pronounced [ka.ˈθa.ɾja] in synizesis, can be hypercorrected to the hiatic [ka.ˈθa.ɾi.a] in formal situations.

== See also ==
- Metaplasm
  - Synalepha
    - Elision
      - Contraction (grammar)
    - Crasis
    - Synaeresis
