= Poetic contraction =

Shortened words used mainly in poetry

Poetic contractions are contractions of words found in poetry but not commonly used in everyday modern English. Also known as elision or syncope, these contractions are usually used to lower the number of syllables in a particular word in order to adhere to the meter of a composition. In languages like French, elision removes the end syllable of a word that ends with a vowel sound when the next begins with a vowel sound, in order to avoid hiatus, or retain a consonant-vowel-consonant-vowel rhythm.

These poetic contractions originate from archaic English. By the end of the 18th century, contractions were generally looked down upon in standardized formal writing. This development may have been influenced by the publication of Samuel Johnson's A Dictionary of the English Language (1755).

== List of common poetic contractions ==
Archaic	Modern
'tis	it is
'twas	it was
o'er	over
gi'	give
ne'er	never
i'	in
e'er	ever
a'	he
e'en	even
ope	open
th'	the
o'	of
needn't	need not
heav'n	heaven
an'	and
ta'en	taken
giggle’t	giggle
de'il	devil
'most	almost

== List of more obscure poetic contractions ==
Archaic	Modern
T'will	it will
t'were	it were
t'would	it would
Is't	is it
o'th'	of the
i'th'	in the
in't	in it
on't	on it
