= Liaison (French) =

Consonant linking at word boundaries

In French, liaison (French pronunciation: [ljɛzɔ̃]) is the pronunciation of a linking consonant between two words in an appropriate phonetic and syntactic context. For example, the word les ('the') is pronounced /le/, the word amis ('friends') is pronounced /ami/, but the combination les amis is pronounced /lez‿ami/, with a linking /z/.

Liaison only happens when the following word starts with a vowel or semivowel, and is restricted to word sequences whose components are linked in sense, e.g., article + noun, adjective + noun, personal pronoun + verb, and so forth. This indicates that liaison is primarily active in high-frequency word associations (collocations).

Most frequently, liaison arises from a mute word-final consonant that used to be pronounced, but in some cases it is inserted from scratch, as in a-t-il ('has he?'), which is the inverted form of il a ('he has'). In certain syntactic environments, liaison is impossible; in others, it is mandatory; in others still, it is possible but not mandatory and its realization is subject to wide stylistic variation.

== Realization of liaison ==
Silent final consonants may be pronounced, in some syntactic contexts, when the following word begins with a vowel or non-aspirated h. Many words with silent final consonants have utterly lost them, e.g. neither the 'n' in million nor the 't' in art is ever pronounced. A liaison should not be made just because a word ends in a silent consonant and the next one starts with a vowel.

The following list describes liaison from an orthographic point of view. Since the latent sound is an ancient one, spellings that are based on the etymology of the word may use a different consonant. Liaison consonants are pronounced as follows (the transcription uses IPA; in IPA, liaison is indicated by placing an undertie [‿] between the consonant and the vowel):

- -s = /.z‿/: les enfants ("the children") = /le.z‿ɑ̃.fɑ̃/.
- -z = /.z‿/: venez ici ("come here") = /və.ne.z‿i.si/.
- -x = /.z‿/: faux amis ("false friends") = /fo.z‿a.mi/.
- -t = /.t‿/: tout homme ("every man") = /tu.t‿ɔm/.
- -d = /.t‿/: grand homme ("great man") = /ɡʁɑ̃.t‿ɔm/.
- -f = /.v‿/: neuf ans ("nine years") = /nœ.v‿ɑ̃/.
- -p = /.p‿/: un prix trop élevé ("a too high price") = /œ̃ pʁi tʁo.p‿el.ve/. The only words that can produce a liaison with /p/ are trop and beaucoup.
- -c = /.k‿/: porc-épic ("porcupine") = /pɔʁ.k‿e.pik/.
- -q = /.k‿/: cinq amis ("five friends") = /sɛ̃.k‿a.mi/. Cinq is the only French word that may end in a mute -q. In modern French, this -q is almost always pronounced as a final /k/, distinctly and no longer mute, regardless of the context.
- -g = /.k‿/ or /.ɡ‿/: long article ("long article") = /lɔ̃.k‿aʁ.tikl/. Traditionally, a liaison with a word ending in -g was realized as /k/, as in sang et eau /sɑ̃.k‿e.o/ "blood and water", but this sounds dated in modern French. The name of the city of Bourg-en-Bresse retains the traditional liaison: /buʁ.k‿ɑ̃.bʁɛs/. It is mostly popular to use /.ɡ‿/ (long article /lɔ̃.ɡ‿aʁ.tikl/), or simply omit the liaison (long article /lɔ̃. aʁ.tikl/).
- -er = /ɛ.ʁ‿/ or /e.ʁ‿/: premier étage ("first floor") = /pʁə.mjɛ.ʁ‿e.taʒ/.
- -il = /i.j‿/: gentil enfant ("kind child") = /ʒɑ̃.ti.j‿ɑ̃.fɑ̃/. (-ille = /i.j‿/: fille affable ("friendly girl") = /fi.j‿a.fa.bl/.)
- -n = /.n‿/: un ami ("a friend") = /œ̃.n‿a.mi/, mon ami /mɔ̃.n‿a.mi/, aucun ami /o.kœ̃.n‿a.mi/, le Malin Esprit (the Evil Spirit, colloquially the Devil) /lə ma.lɛ̃.n‿ɛs.pʁi/.

There is also a type of liaison where an adjective changes its form before a vowel-initial noun: adjectives ending on -ain, -ein, -en, -in or -on denasalize their vowels. The word bon is /bɔ̃/ but bon ami is /bɔ.n‿a.mi/. Similarly, certain ami /sɛʁ.tɛ.n‿a.mi/, divin enfant /di.vi.n‿ɑ̃.fɑ̃/ and Moyen Âge /mwa.jɛ.n‿ɑʒ/. This makes the adjectives sound like their feminine forms, so bon ami is pronounced the same as bonne amie. In some cases, this alternation is reflected in the orthography: un beau cygne but un bel oiseau (both masculine singular).

As indicated in the phonetic representations above, liaison consonants are typically realized with enchainement – that is, the originally word-final consonant is pronounced as the onset of the following syllable. Enchainement is also observed for pronounced (in contrast to the silent ones of this section) word-final consonants when followed by a vowel-initial word in connected speech, as in cher ami [ʃɛ.ʁa.mi] ("dear friend"). In both cases, enchainement can be seen as a strategy for avoiding syllables without onsets in French.

=== Liaison on French numerals ===
Some numbers pattern in complex ways, allowing up to three different pronunciations depending on context. For brevity, from now on "vowel-initial" means "phonologically vowel-initial, excluding aspirated h", while "consonant-initial" means "phonologically consonant-initial, including aspirated h". Also note that these rules may slightly vary depending on dialect.

- cinq ("five"): It is always pronounced as /sɛ̃k/. However, an oral stop in French may assimilate to a nasal one when it appears after a nasal vowel and before another consonant, so "cinq minutes" is frequently pronounced /sɛ̃ŋ.mi.nyt/.
- six ("six"): It is pronounced /siz/ before a vowel-initial noun, adjective or month name, e.g. six hommes /si.zɔm/, six avril /si.za.vril/. However, it is pronounced /si/ before a consonant-initial noun, adjective or month name, e.g. six pommes /si.pɔm/, six beaux oiseaux /si.bo.zwa.zo/, six mars /si.mars/. Elsewhere, it is pronounced /sis/, e.g. six ou neuf /sis.u.nœf/.
- sept ("seven"): It is consistently pronounced the same: /sɛt/, as a homophone of cette.
- huit ("eight"): It is /ɥi/ when before a consonant-initial noun, adjective or month name, e.g. huit minutes /ɥi.mi.nyt/. Elsewhere, it is /ɥit/, e.g. huit ou neuf /ɥi.tu.nœf/.
- neuf ("nine"): It is pronounced /nœf/, with the exception of /nœv/ in neuf ans, neuf heures and, rarely, neuf hommes. Traditionally neuf is also pronounced /nø/ before a consonant-initial noun, adjective or month name, like its homophone neuf meaning "new" (see Neuf-Brisach).
- dix ("ten"): With respect to liaison, it behaves like six. However, the common combinations dix-sept ("seventeen"), dix-huit ("eighteen") and dix-neuf ("nineteen") are respectively pronounced /di.sɛt/, /di.zɥit/ and /diz.nœf/.
- vingt ("twenty"): It is pronounced /vɛ̃t/ before a vowel-initial noun, adjective or digit from one to nine, e.g. vingt-six /vɛ̃t.sis/, vingt amis /vɛ̃.ta.mi/. Elsewhere, it is pronounced /vɛ̃/. However, in Belgium, Switzerland, and most of eastern and northern France, vingt is generally pronounced /vɛ̃t/ regardless of the context.
- quatre-vingt ("eighty"): The t is never pronounced: quatre-vingt-dix-neuf (99) is /ka.tʁə.vɛ̃.diz.nœf/, quatre-vingt-un (81) is /ka.tʁə.vɛ̃.œ̃/ and quatre-vingt-onze (91) is /ka.tʁə.vɛ̃.ɔ̃z/. However, quatre-vingts makes a /z/ liaison before vowel-initial nouns or adjectives.

== Constraints on liaison ==
Although the actual realization of liaison is subject to interacting syntactic, prosodic, and stylistic constraints, the primary requirement for liaison at a given word boundary is the phonological and lexical identity of the words involved. The preceding word must supply a potential liaison consonant and the following word must be vowel-initial (and not exceptionally marked as disallowing liaison). If the two words are separated by a prosodic break, a liaison non enchaînée may happen, as in /ilz‿ɔ̃ ... t‿ɑ̃tɑ̃dy/ ('ils ont... entendu'), where the liaison consonant is pronounced at the onset of the word after the hesitation pause.

Grammatical descriptions of French identify three kinds of liaison contexts: Those where liaison is mandatory, those where it is impossible, and those where it is optional. Pedagogical grammars naturally emphasize what is mandatory or forbidden, and these two categories tend to be artificially inflated by traditional prescriptive rules. Speakers' natural behavior in spontaneous speech shows that in fact relatively few contexts can be said to systematically give rise to, or fail to give rise to, liaison. Any discussion of liaison must take both descriptive and prescriptive perspectives into account, because this is an area of French grammar where speakers can consciously control their linguistic behavior out of an awareness of how their speech diverges from what is considered "correct".

=== Mandatory liaison ===
There are a small number of contexts where speakers consistently produce liaison in all speech styles, and where the absence of liaison is immediately perceived as an error of pronunciation. These are the contexts where liaison is truly mandatory:

- between a determiner and a following adjective or noun: les enfants /le.z‿ɑ̃.fɑ̃/ ("the children"), ton ancien prof [tɔ̃.n‿ɑ̃.sjɛ̃ pʁɔf] ("your former teacher"), tout homme /tu.t‿ɔm/ ("every man")
- between a subject or object pronoun and the verb, or vice versa, or between two pronouns: nous avons /nu.z‿a.vɔ̃/ ("we have"), prenez-en /pʁə.ne.z‿ɑ̃/ ("take some"), elles en achètent /ɛl.z‿ɑ̃.n‿a.ʃɛt/ ("they buy some")
- in some lexicalized expressions and compound words: États-Unis /e.ta.z‿y.ni/ ("USA"), porc-épic /pɔʁ.k‿e.pik/ ("porcupine")

The first two contexts also require mandatory vowel elision for the relevant determiners and pronouns (le, la, je, me, se, etc.)

The following contexts are often listed as mandatory liaison contexts, but they are more accurately characterized as contexts where liaison is frequent:

- between an adjective and a noun that follows it: important effort /ɛ̃.pɔʁ.tɑ̃.t‿ɛ.fɔʁ/ ("important effort"), certaines études /sɛʁ.tɛn.z‿e.tyd/ ("some studies")
- between an adverb and the word it modifies: assez intéressant [a.se.z‿ɛ̃.te.ʁɛ.sɑ̃/ ("quite interesting"), trop amusé /tʁo.p‿a.my.ze] ("amused too much")
- after a (monosyllabic) preposition: chez un ami /ʃe.z‿œ̃.n‿a.mi/ ("at a friend's house")

Specific instances of these combinations reveal varying tendencies. For certain lexical items (e.g. petit, très), speakers may have a preference for liaison approaching that of the mandatory liaison contexts.

==== Liaison on inverted verbs ====
The consonant [t] is obligatorily realized between the finite verb and a vowel-initial subject pronoun (il(s), elle(s) or on) in inversion constructions. Orthographically, the two words are joined by a hyphen, or by -t- if the verb does not end in -t or -d:

uninverted form	inverted form	translation
elle dort /ɛl dɔʁ/	dort-elle /dɔʁ.t‿ɛl/	she sleeps
il vend /il vɑ̃/	vend-il /vɑ̃.t‿il/	he sells
ils parlent /il paʁl/	parlent-ils /paʁl.t‿il/	they speak
on parle /ɔ̃ paʁl/	parle-t-on /paʁl.t‿ɔ̃/	one speaks

The written linking consonant -t- is necessary for 3rd person singular verbs whose orthographic form ends in a letter other than -t or -d. This situation arises in the following cases:

- ending in -e: present tense indicative of all regular -er verbs, and some -ir verbs, such as ouvrir (ouvre "opens")
- ending in -a: va "goes", a "has", simple past tense of -er verbs, future tense of all verbs
- ending in a consonant: vainc "conquers", convainc "convinces"

The appearance of this consonant in modern French can be described as a restoration of the Latin 3rd person singular ending -t, under the influence of other French verbs that have always maintained final -t.

The earliest examples of this analogical t in writing date to the mid-15th century, although this practice (and the corresponding pronunciation) was not fully accepted by grammarians until the 17th century.

When the first-person singular present tense form of the indicative or subjunctive is found in inversion, the writer must change the final e to either é (traditional usage) or è (rectified modern usage), in order to link the two words : Parlè-je ?, /paʁlɛʒ/, "Am I speaking?" (This is a very rare construction, however.)

uninverted form	inverted form	translation
je parle /ʒə paʁl/	parlè-je?, parlé-je /paʁlɛ‿ʒ/	I speak
je parlasse /ʒə paʁlas/	parlassè-je?, parlassé-je /paʁlasɛ‿ʒ/	I might speak
j'ouvre /ʒuvʁ/	ouvrè-je?, ouvré-je /uvʁɛ‿ʒ/	I open
j'ouvrisse /ʒuvʁis/	ouvrissè-je?, ouvrissé-je /uvʁisɛ‿ʒ/	I might open

==== Liaison on imperative verbs ====
Imperative verbs followed by en and y always acquire liaison, /z‿ɑ̃/ and /z‿i/ respectively.

conjugation	translation
parles-en /paʁl.z‿ɑ̃/	talk about it!
dors-y /dɔʁ.z‿i/	sleep there/here!

The imperative suffixes moi + en and moi + y give as a result m’en and m’y, and analogically toi + en and toi + y become t’en and t’y. However, in colloquial speech the expressions moi-z-en, toi-z-en; moi-z-y and toi-z-y have become widespread (also registered as -z’en and -z’y). The possible reason for this phonological trend is because it follows the same logic, in which all verbs ending on en and y always use the liaison /z‿/, like in parles-en /paʁlz‿ɑ̃/ (talk [about it]!), vas-y /vɑz‿i/ (go [here/there]!).

standard form	unstandard form	translation
donnes-en /dɔnz‿ɑ̃/	-	give some of it!
donnez-en /dɔnez‿ɑ̃/	-	give some of it!
donnons-en /dɔ.nɔ̃z‿ɑ̃/	-	let's give some of it!
donne-m’en /dɔn.mɑ̃/	donne-moi-z-en /dɔn.mwɑ‿z‿ɑ̃/, donnes-en-moi /dɔnz‿ɑ̃.mwa/	give me some of it!
donne-lui-en /dɔn.lɥi.ɑ̃/	donne-lui-z-en /dɔn.lɥi‿z‿ɑ̃/, donnes-en-lui /dɔnz‿ɑ̃.lɥi/	give to him/her some of it!

=== Impossible liaison ===
There are other contexts where speakers produce liaison only erratically (e.g. due to interference from orthography while reading aloud), and perceive liaison to be ungrammatical.

- between a non-pronominal noun phrase (e.g. a non-pronominal subject) and the verb: Mes amis arrivent /me.z‿a.mi ∅ a.ʁiv/ ("My friends are arriving.")
- between two complements of a ditransitive verb: donner des cadeaux à Jean /dɔ.ne de ka.do ∅ a ʒɑ̃/ ("give presents to Jean")
- between two complete clauses: "Ils parlent et j'écoute." /il paʁl ∅ e ʒe.kut/ ("They talk and I listen.")
- after certain words, for example et ("and"), and all singular nouns. This can help disambiguate between word uses: pronounced without liaison and for précieux as a noun, un précieux insolent /œ̃ pʁe.sjø ɛ̃.sɔ.lɑ̃/ can mean "an insolent member of the précieuses literary movement", but with liaison on the adjective précieux as in un précieux insolent /œ̃ pʁe.sjø.z‿ɛ̃.sɔ.lɑ̃/, it can only refer to a preciously insolent person (to be clear, the French insolent here is a substantive adjective).

In fixed expressions, singular nouns can allow liaison (accent‿aigu, fait‿accompli, cas‿échéant, mot‿à mot, de part‿et d'autre).

- before "aspirated h" words: These are phonetically vowel-initial words that are exceptionally marked as not allowing liaison. Most of these words are written with a leading h (haricot, héros, haleter) which is not pronounced itself, but a few begin with a vowel or glide (onze, oui, yaourt). Note that some words beginning in h do experience liaison (e.g. homme in tout homme). Such words are said to begin with a mute h or h muet.

Grammars mention other contexts where liaison is "forbidden", despite (or precisely because) speakers sometimes do produce them spontaneously.

- Règle de Littré. A liaison consonant should not be pronounced immediately after /ʁ/, as in pars avec lui /paʁ a.vɛk lɥi/, fort agréable /fɔʁ a.ɡʁe.abl/ or vers une solution /vɛʁ yn sɔ.ly.sjɔ̃/. Plural /z/ is recognized as an exception to this rule, and various other counterexamples can be observed, like de part et d'autre /də paʁ.t‿e.dotʁ/.

=== Optional liaison ===
All remaining contexts can be assumed to allow liaison optionally, although exhaustive empirical studies are not yet available. Preferences vary widely for individual examples, for individual speakers, and for different speech styles. The realization of optional liaisons is a signal of formal register, and pedagogical grammars sometimes turn this into a recommendation to produce as many optional liaisons as possible in "careful" speech. The conscious or semi-conscious application of prescriptive rules leads to errors of hypercorrection in formal speech situations (see discussion below).

Conversely, in informal styles, speakers will semi-consciously avoid certain optional liaisons in order not to sound "pedantic" or "stilted". Other liaisons lack this effect. For example, Ils‿ont (‿) attendu ("they have waited") is less marked than tu as‿attendu ("you have waited"), and neither liaison is likely to be realized in highly informal speech (where one might instead hear [i(l).z‿ɔ̃.ʔa.tɑ̃.dy] and [taʔa.tɑ̃.dy], or simply [ta.a.tɑ̃.dy].) On the other hand, the liaison in pas‿encore can be either present or absent in this register.

== Liaison errors ==
As can be seen, liaison is only mandatory in a small set of frequent cases. The omission of such a liaison would be considered an error, not simply as taking liberties with the rule. In cases of optional liaison, the omission is common, and liaison appears only in careful speech.

On the other end, producing a liaison where one is impossible is perceived as an error. For example, pronouncing a liaison consonant instead of respecting hiatus before an aspirated h is taken to indicate an uncultivated or unsophisticated speaker. While all speakers know the rule, there is variation as to which words it is applied to. The effect is less noticeable with rare words (such as hiatus itself), which many speakers may not spontaneously identify as aspirated h words.

Errors due to hypercorrection or euphony are also observed: a liaison is pronounced where it does not exist (where it is possible by spelling, but forbidden, as with et (-t-) ainsi, or where it is impossible even by spelling, as with moi (-z-) avec). This phenomenon is called pataquès.

Numerals that lack a final orthographic 's' may sometimes be followed by an epenthetic /z/, as in 'cinq-z-amis' /sɛ̃k.za.mi/, to form a fausse liaison (or 'pataquès') in colloquial/non-formal speech and in some modern popular songs, a common practice for children or in imitations of their spoken language by adults.

Liaison errors are perceived in the same way as omissions of disjunction, suggesting an "uncultivated" speaker or extremely informal speech. Such an error is sometimes called cuir (‘leather’) when the inserted consonant is /.t/, velours (‘velvet’) when it is /.z/, although dictionaries do not all agree on these terms:

- Cuir (addition of erroneous -t-):
  - Tu peux-t-avoir, instead of tu peux‿avoir (with /.z‿/).
- Velours (addition of erroneous -z-):
  - moi-z-aussi.
  - cent-z-euros (100 €), instead of cent‿euros (with /.t‿/) — although deux cents‿euros (200 €) is correct (with /.z‿/).

== Special cases: poetic verse and applied diction ==
The reading of poetry (whether said or sung) requires that all liaisons be used (except those described above as impossible), even those of -e's in the second-person singular as well as the reading of all necessary "null e's" (see the French article on poetry for more details). The reading of the liaisons affects the number of syllables pronounced, hence is of chief importance for the correct pronunciation of a verse. French speakers tend as much as possible to avoid a hiatus or a succession of two consonants between two words, in a more or less artificial way.

The Académie Française considers careful pronunciation (but without the mandatory reading of "null e's") to be necessary in a formal setting. However, pushed too far, the over-proliferation of liaisons can render a speech ridiculous. It has been pointed out that French politicians and speakers (Jacques Chirac, for example) pronounce some liaison consonants, independently of the following word, introducing a pause or a schwa afterwards. For example, ils ont entendu ("they heard") is normally pronounced /il.z‿ɔ̃ ɑ̃.tɑ̃.dy/ or, in more careful speech, /il.z‿ɔ̃.t‿ɑ̃.tɑ̃.dy/. A speaker using this "politician" pronunciation would say /il.z‿ɔ̃t | ɑ̃.tɑ̃.dy/ (where /|/ represents a pause; ils ont ... entendu). One might even hear ils ont décidé ("they decided") pronounced /il.z‿ɔ̃t | de.si.de/ (ils ont ... décidé) or /il.z‿ɔ̃.t‿øːː de.si.de/ (ils ont -euh .. décidé). In the first example, we have liaison without enchainement, not the normal configuration in ordinary speech. In the second, the liaison is completely non-standard, since it introduces a liaison consonant before another consonant.

== Mechanics of liaison ==
Liaison is a form of vestigial enchainement that involves a follow-through between a final consonant and an initial vowel. However, what is particularly distinct for both liaison and enchainement is that the final consonant in both cases resyllabifies with the following vowel. Liaison is therefore a phonological process occurring at word boundaries, specifically an external sandhi phenomenon that may be disrupted in pausa.

Like elision (as in *je aime → j'aime), liaison can be characterized functionally as a euphonic strategy for avoiding hiatus. This type of analysis is called a synchronic approach. This approach does not explain cases where the first word already ends in a consonant, such as tels‿amis, and is therefore already perfectly euphonic.

It is also possible to analyse liaison diachronically. With this approach, the liaison consonant has always been there since the days of Latin, and has merely been elided in other contexts over time. So, the s pronounced in mes amis can be seen as simply preserving the s that was always pronounced in meos amicos. Seen in this way, it is mes frères that is exceptional, having lost the s that was pronounced in meos fratres.

French liaison and enchainement are essentially the same external sandhi process, where liaison represents the fixed, grammaticalized remnants of the phenomenon before the fall of final consonants, and enchainement is the regular, modern-day continuation of the phenomenon, operating after the fall of former final consonants. The process is the movement of final consonants across word boundaries to initial position in vowel-initial words so as to better conform to the French language's preference for open syllables (over 70%), i.e., V, CV, or CCV, especially where two vowels might otherwise link together (vowel hiatus). Whereas enchainement occurs in all places in a sentence, liaison is restricted to within sense units (groupes rythmiques) and is strictly forbidden across these intonational boundaries. This implies that liaison, like enchainement, is restricted by open juncture, and in general, resyllabified consonants maintain their articulatory traits as if not in onset position. This difference helps French speakers distinguish between liaised consonants, pronounced as if before open juncture, and regular onset consonants, pronounced as if before closed juncture.

=== Medieval consonants ===
For example, the word grand is written grant in medieval manuscripts (grant served for both masculine and feminine gender). The orthography of that age was more phonetic; the word was in all likeliness pronounced [ɡrɑ̃nt], with an audible final /t/, at least until the twelfth century. When that consonant became mute (like the majority of ancient final consonants in French), the word continued to be written grant (the preservation of this written form is explained by other reasons; see note), and then became grand by influence of its Latin etymology grandis, with a new (analogic) feminine form grande. The current spelling with a final mute d allows to better show the alternation between grand and grande (an alternation gran ~ grande or grant ~ grande would look less regular to the eye), as well as the lexical relation to grandeur, grandir, grandiloquent, etc. The root grand is written thus regardless of whether the d is pronounced [d], [t] or it is silent, in order for its derivatives to have a single graphic identity, which facilitates memorization and reading.

However, the ancient final [t] of grand did not cease to be pronounced when the following word began with a vowel and belonged to the same sense unit. Effectively, the consonant was no longer pronounced at the end of the word, but at the beginning of the next. Now an initial consonant rather than a final one, it did not undergo the same sound changes, so it continued to be pronounced.

Bearing in mind that grammatical stress in French falls on the final full syllable of a phrase, this situation can be symbolized as follows (the symbol ˈ indicates stress):

- grand is /ˈɡʁɑ̃t/, which loses its final consonant at the end of a stress group and is realized as [ˈɡʁɑ̃];
- grand + homme = /ˈɡʁɑ̃t/ + /ˈɔm(ə)/, which becomes grand homme [ˈɡʁɑ̃.t‿ɔm] (with a single stress); grand does not lose its final consonant because it is treated as the onset of the following syllable.

This has to do with what the hearer considers to be a word. If grand homme is analyzed as /ɡʁɑ̃.tɔm/, the ear in fact understands /ˈɡʁɑ̃.tɔm/, a continuous group of phonemes whose tonic accent signals that they form a unit. It is possible to make a division as /ɡʁɑ̃/ + /tɔm/ instead of [ɡʁɑ̃t] + [ɔm]. Then this /t/ will no longer be felt to be a final consonant but a pre-stress intervocalic consonant, and therefore it will resist the deletion that it would undergo if it were at the end of a stressed syllable. It can however undergo other modifications thereafter.

The written form, though, was adapted to criteria that are not phonetic, but etymological (among others): where grand is written, [ɡʁɑ̃t] is pronounced in front of certain vowels, without that being really awkward: the maintenance of the visual alternation -d ~ -de is more productive.

The other cases are explained in a similar fashion: sang, for example, was pronounced [sɑ̃ŋk] (and written sanc) in Old French, but the final -g has replaced the -c in order to recall the Latin etymology, sanguis, and derivatives like sanguinaire, sanguin. Currently this liaison is almost never heard except sometimes in the expression "suer sang et eau". Outside those, the hiatus is tolerated.

Finally, the case of -s and -x pronounced [z] in liaison is explained differently. One must be aware, firstly, that word-final -x is a medieval shorthand for -us (in Old French people wrote chevax for chevaus, later written chevaux when the idea behind this -x was forgotten) (except in words like voix and noix where 's' was changed to 'x' by restoration of Latin usage (vox and nux)). The sound noted -s and -x was a hard [s], which did not remain in French after the twelfth century (it can be found in words like (tu) chantes or doux), but which was protected from complete elision when the following word began with a vowel (which effectively means, when it was found between two vowels). However, in French, such [s] is voiced and becomes [z] (which explains why, in words like rose and mise, the s is pronounced [z] and not [s]).

==== Note ====
If the final -t of grant was kept in the Middle Ages in spite of the disappearance of the corresponding [t], it is because there existed, along with this form, others like grants (rather written granz), wherein the [t] was heard, protected from elision by the following [s]. The ancient orthography rendered this alternation visible before another one replaced it (the one with d). Indeed, it would be false to state that the orthography of Old French did not follow usage, or that it was without rules.

== Fluctuating usages ==
From the sixteenth century onward, it was common for grammarians who wished to describe the French language or discuss its orthography to write documents in a phonetic alphabet. From some of these documents, we can see that the liaisons have not always been pronounced as they are today.

For example, the Prayer by Gilles Vaudelin (a document compiled in 1713 using a phonetic alphabet, and introduced in the Nouvelle manière d'écrire comme on parle en France ["A New Way of Writing as We Speak in France"]), probably representative of oral language, maybe rural, of the time, shows the absence of the following liaisons (Vaudelin's phonetic alphabet is transcribed using equivalent IPA):

- Saint Esprit: [sɛ̃ ɛs.pʁi] instead of [sɛ̃.t‿ɛs.pʁi];
- tout à Vous glorifier: [tu a]... instead of [tu.t‿a];
- qui êtes aux cieux: [ki ɛt o sjø] instead of [ki ɛt.z‿o sjø] or [ki ɛ.tə.z‿o sjø].

== See also ==
- Linking and intrusive R
- Crasis
- Metaplasm
- Transphonologization
- Consonant mutation
