= Clipping (morphology) =

Reduction of a word to one of its parts

In linguistics, clipping, also called truncation or shortening, is word formation by removing some segments of an existing word to create a diminutive word or a clipped compound. Clipping differs from abbreviation, which is based on a shortening of the written, rather than the spoken, form of an existing word or phrase. Clipping is also different from back-formation, which proceeds by (pseudo-)morpheme rather than segment, and where the new word may differ in sense and word class from its source. In English, clipping may extend to contraction, which mostly involves the elision of a vowel that is replaced by an apostrophe in writing.

== Creation and adoption ==
According to Hans Marchand, clippings are not coined as words belonging to the core lexicon of a language. They typically originate as synonyms within the jargon or slang of an in-group, such as schools, army, police, and the medical profession. For example, exam(ination), math(ematics), and lab(oratory) originated in school slang; spec(ulation) and tick(et = credit) in stock-exchange slang; spec(ification) and mem(ory) in IT slang; and vet(eran) and cap(tain) in army slang.

Clipped forms can pass into common usage when they are widely useful, becoming part of standard language, which most speakers would agree has happened with math(s), lab, exam, phone (from telephone), fax (from facsimile – Latin for "make alike"), ad (from advertisement), fridge (from refrigerator), and various others. When their usefulness is limited to narrower contexts, they remain outside the standard register. Many, such as mani and pedi for manicure and pedicure or mic/mike for microphone, occupy a middle ground in which their appropriate register is a subjective judgment, but succeeding decades tend to see them become more widely used.

== Types ==
According to Irina Arnold, clipping mainly consists of the following types:

- Final clipping, which may include apocope
- Initial clipping, which may include apheresis, or procope
- Medial clipping, or syncope
- Complex clipping, creating clipped compounds

Final and initial clipping may be combined into a sort of "bilateral clipping", and result in curtailed words with the middle part of the prototype retained, which usually includes the syllable with primary stress. Examples: fridge (refrigerator), rizz (charisma), rona (coronavirus), shrink (head-shrinker), tec (detective); also flu (which omits the stressed syllable of influenza), jams (retaining the binary noun -s of pajamas/pyjamas) or jammies (adding diminutive -ie).

Another common shortening in English will clip a word and then add some sort of suffix. That suffix can be either neutral or casual in nature, as in the -o of combo (combination) and convo (conversation), or else diminutive and/or hypochoric, as in the -y or -ie of Sammy (Samantha) and selfie (self portrait), and the -s of babes (baby, as a term of endearment) and Babs (Barbara). Sometimes, the result can have the same number of syllables as the original longer form, as in choccy (chocolate) or Davy (David).

=== Final ===
In a final clipping, the most common type in English, the beginning of the prototype is retained. The unclipped original may be either a simple or a composite. Examples include ad and advert (advertisement), cable (cablegram), doc (doctor), exam (examination), fax (facsimile), gas (gasoline), gym (gymnastics, gymnasium), memo (memorandum), mutt (muttonhead), pub (public house), pop (popular music), and clit (clitoris). An example of apocope in Israeli Hebrew is the word lehit, which derives from להתראות lehitraot, meaning "see you, goodbye".

Because final clippings are most common in English, this often leads to clipped forms from different sources which end up looking identical. For example, app can equally refer to an appetizer or an application depending on the context, while vet can be short for either veteran or veterinarian.

=== Initial ===
Initial (or fore) clipping retains the final part of the word. Examples: bot (robot), chute (parachute), roach (cockroach), gator (alligator), phone (telephone), pike (turnpike), varsity (university), net (Internet).

=== Medial ===
Words with the middle part of the word left out are few. They may be further subdivided into two groups: (a) words with a final-clipped stem retaining the functional morpheme: maths (mathematics), specs (spectacles); (b) contractions due to a gradual process of elision under the influence of rhythm and context. Thus, fancy (fantasy), ma'am (madam), and fo'c'sle may be regarded as accelerated forms.

=== Complex ===
Clipped forms are also used in compounds. One part of the original compound most often remains intact. Examples are: cablegram (cable telegram), op art (optical art), org-man (organization man), linocut (linoleum cut). Sometimes both halves of a compound are clipped as in navicert (navigation certificate). In these cases it is difficult to know whether the resultant formation should be treated as a clipping or as a blend, for the border between the two types is not always clear. According to Bauer (1983), the easiest way to draw the distinction is to say that those forms which retain compound stress are clipped compounds, whereas those that take simple word stress are not. By this criterion bodbiz, Chicom, Comsymp, Intelsat, midcult, pro-am, photo op, sci-fi, and sitcom are all compounds made of clippings.

== See also ==
- Abbreviation
- Acronym
- Blend word
- Clipping (phonetics)
- Compound (linguistics)
- Contraction (grammar)
- Diminutive
- Word formation
