= Correption =

Poetic device

In Latin and Greek poetry, correption (Latin: correptiō [kɔrˈrɛpt̪ioː], "a shortening") is the shortening of a long vowel at the end of one word before a vowel at the beginning of the next.

Homer uses correption in dactylic hexameter:

- Ἄνδρα **μοι** ἔννεπε, Μοῦσα, πολύτροπον, ὃς μάλα πολλὰ
  πλάγχθ**η, ἐ**πεὶ Τροίης ἱερὸν πτολίεθρον ἔπερσε·
  — Odyssey 1.1-2
- Tell me, O Muse, of the man of many devices, who wandered full
  many ways after he had sacked the sacred citadel of Troy.
  — translation by A.T. Murray

Here in the first line the οι diphthong in the second word "μοι" would normally be a long vowel and thus create a long syllable, but because the next word begins with a vowel, the οι diphthong suffers correption, in the form of a partial ellision whereby its long syllable is reduced to a short one. Similarly, in the second line the sequence η ε (in bold print) must be pronounced as ε ε to preserve the long—short—short syllable weight sequence of a dactyl. The scansion of the second line is thus:

πλαγχ θε, ε | πει Τροι | η ςι ε | ρον πτο λι | εθ ρο νε | περ σε

== Attic ==
Typically, in Homeric meter, a syllable is scanned long or "closed" when a vowel is followed by two or more consonants. However, in Attic Greek, a short vowel followed by a plosive and a liquid consonant or nasal stop remains a short or "open" syllable. This is called Attic correption, sometime known by its Latin name correptio Attica.

Therefore, the first syllable of a word like δᾰ́κρυ could be scanned as "δά | κρυ" (open/short), exhibiting Attic correption, or as "δάκ | ρυ" (closed/long), in keeping with the conventions of Homeric verse.

== See also ==
- Metaplasm
- Hiatus
- Synalepha
