= Prodelision =

Prodelision is a form of elision where, in a string of two words, the latter word loses its initial vowel(s).

Example:

"Namqu(e) etsi nullum memorabile nomen
femine(a) in poena (e)st, habet haec victoria laudem,
exstinxisse nefas." (Aeneid 2.583-585)

The "e" of "est" elides in the second line, rather than the "a" of "poena". This is very common in Latin with forms of the verb "esse". This type of elision is also common in Hindustani.

In poetry, it can allow for the use of words in a metric form that would otherwise make their use impossible.

== See also ==
- Synalepha
