= Clipping (phonetics) =

Shortening process in phonetics

In phonetics, clipping is the process of shortening the articulation of a phonetic segment, usually a vowel. A clipped vowel is pronounced more quickly than an unclipped vowel and is often also reduced.

== Examples ==
=== Dutch ===
Particularly in Netherlands Dutch, vowels in unstressed syllables are shortened and centralized, which is particularly noticeable with tense vowels; compare the /oː/ phoneme in konijn [kʊˈnɛin] 'rabbit' and koning [ˈkounɪŋ] 'king'.

=== English ===
Many dialects of English (such as Australian English, General American English, Received Pronunciation, South African English and Standard Canadian English) have two types of non-phonemic clipping: pre-fortis clipping and rhythmic clipping.

Pre-fortis clipping occurs in a stressed syllable before a fortis consonant. For example, bet [ˈbɛt] has a vowel that is shorter than the one in bed [ˈbɛˑd]. Vowels preceding voiceless consonants that begin a next syllable (as in keychain /ˈkiː.tʃeɪn/) are not affected by this rule.

Rhythmic clipping occurs in polysyllabic words. The more syllables a word has, the shorter its vowels are. For example, the first vowel of readership [ˈɹi.dəɹˌʃɪp] is shorter than in reader [ˈɹiˑ.dəɹ], which, in turn, is shorter than in read [ˈɹiːd].

Clipping with vowel reduction also occurs in many unstressed syllables.

Because of the variability of vowel length, the ⟨ː⟩ diacritic is sometimes omitted in IPA transcriptions of English and so words such as dawn or lead are transcribed as /dɔn/ and /lid/, instead of the more usual /dɔːn/ and /liːd/. Neither type of transcription is more correct, as both convey exactly the same information, but transcription systems that use the length mark make it more clear whether a vowel is checked or free. Compare the length of the RP vowel /ɒ/ in the word not as opposed to the corresponding /ɒ/ in Canadian English, which is typically longer (like RP /ɑː/) because Canadian /ɒ/ is a free vowel (checked /ɒ/ is very rare in North America, as it relies on a three-way distinction between LOT, THOUGHT and PALM) and so can also be transcribed as /ɒː/.

The Scottish vowel length rule is used instead of those rules in Scotland and sometimes also in Northern Ireland.

=== Serbo-Croatian ===
Many speakers of Serbo-Croatian from Croatia and Serbia pronounce historical unstressed long vowels as short, with some exceptions (such as genitive plural endings). Therefore, the name Jadranka is pronounced [jâdraŋka], rather than [jâdraːŋka].

== See also ==
- Vowel devoicing:
  - Blackfoot language § Vowel devoicing
  - Cayuga language § Devoiced vowels
  - French phonology § Devoicing
  - Japanese phonology § Devoicing
- Apheresis (linguistics)
- Clipping (morphology)
- Syncope (phonetics)
- Vowel reduction

== Bibliography ==
- Alexander, Ronelle (2006), Bosnian/Croatian/Serbian – A Grammar with Sociolinguistic Commentary, The University of Wisconsin Press, ISBN 978-0-299-21194-3
- Collins, Beverley; Mees, Inger M. (2003) [First published 1981], The Phonetics of English and Dutch (5th ed.), Leiden: Brill Publishers, ISBN 9004103406
- Wells, John C. (2008), Longman Pronunciation Dictionary (3rd ed.), Longman, ISBN 9781405881180
