= Argies (band) =

Argentine musical group

Background information
- Origin: Rosario, Santa Fe
- Genres: Punk rock Reggae; Ska
- Years active: 1984–present
- Members: David Balbina, Tobías Rehm, Pablo Fraschini, Hooli Alvarez. Other members: Ilan Amores, Damian Fiore, Manu Magariños

Argies is a band from Argentina playing punk rock, reggae, dub and ska, formed in Rosario, Santa Fe in 1984. The term "Argies" is the pejorative apocope for "Argentine" used extensively by British soldiers during the Falklands War in 1982. Their musical roots lie in British punk from the seventies. The band's lyrics have a testimonial style and nowadays turn to a deeper search into human ethics.

Unlike most bands, which have fixed members, Argies works as a cooperative of independent musicians. New members play until they choose to leave, helping to create a cultural movement across the years.

They have performed numerous shows in Argentina and 45 other countries. Between 1996 and 2022, Argies played 1211 shows in Europe, 74 shows in Latin America and 43 shows in Asia (included 14 shows in China).

Although the composition of the Band changes, its founder and singer, David Balbina, has remained the most visible face since its inception.

== Discography ==
- 1996: Historias y corridas
- 1998: A media asta
- 2001: La Frontera
- 2002: Great Combat Performances
- 2003: Himnos de combate
- 2003: Fake Reaction
- 2005: Al límite de las utopías
- 2007: Lista Negra, historia de Argies
- 2008: Quien despierta
- 2010: Click Off
- 2012: Don´t cry for me best of... in English
- 2013: Bailando en mis Zapatos
- 2014: 30 años en las Trincheras
- 2015: Siempre alerta - live
- 2016: Prost, Nazdrowie, Cheers
- 2019: Vida cara
- 2020: Volviéndose Ska
- 2021: Global Live - live
- 2022: Reset
- 2024: Nunca calladitos!
- 2025: S.O.S.

== See also ==
- Argentine punk
