= Aphetic =

Aphetic may refer to:

- Apheresis, in linguistics, is a sound change in which the initial vowel is dropped from a word
- 'relating to the apheta', or aphetic place, a term in astrology (from the Greek word for 'start-point')
