= Syncope (phonology) =

Loss of a sound within a word

In phonology, syncope (/ˈsɪŋkəpi/; from Ancient Greek: συγκοπή, romanized: sunkopḗ, lit. 'cutting up') is the loss of one or more sounds from the interior of a word, especially the loss of an unstressed vowel. It is found in both synchronic and diachronic analyses of languages. Its opposite, whereby sounds are added, is epenthesis.

== Synchronic analysis ==
Synchronic analysis studies linguistic phenomena at one moment of a language's history, usually the present, in contrast to diachronic analysis, which studies a language's states and the patterns of change across a historical timeframe. In modern languages, syncope occurs in inflection, poetry, and informal speech.

=== Inflections ===
In languages such as Irish and Hebrew, the process of inflection can cause syncope:

Verbs:

- Irish: imir (to play) should become *imirím (I play). However, the addition of the -ím causes syncope and the second-last syllable vowel i is lost so imirim becomes imrím.
- Hebrew: כָּתַב, katav (katav), (he) wrote, becomes כָּתְבוּ, katvu (katvu), (they) wrote, when the third-person plural ending ־וּ (-u) is added.

Nouns:

- Irish: inis (island) should become *inise in the genitive case. However, instead of *Baile na hInise, road signs say, Baile na hInse (the town of the island). Once again, there is the loss of the second i.

If the present root form in Irish is the result of diachronic syncope, synchronic syncope for inflection is prevented.

=== As a poetic device ===
Sounds may be removed from the interior of a word as a rhetorical or poetic device: for embellishment or for the sake of the meter.

- Latin commōverat > poetic commōrat ("he had moved")
- English hastening > poetic hast'ning
- English heaven > poetic heav'n
- English over > poetic o'er
- English ever > poetic e'er, often confused with ere ("before")

=== Informal speech ===
Various sorts of colloquial reductions might be called "syncope" or "compression".

Contractions in English such as "didn't" or "can't" are typically cases of syncope.

- English Australian > colloquial Strine, pronounced /straɪn/
- English did not > didn't, pronounced /ˈdɪdənt/
- English I would have > I'd've, pronounced /ˈaɪdəv/
- English going to > colloquial gonna (generally only when unstressed and when expressing intention rather than direction), pronounced /ɡənə/ or, before a vowel, /ɡənu/
- American English I am going to (in the same context as the previous example) pronounced as /ˈaɪmənə/
- English library pronounced as /laɪbri/ (haplology)

== Diachronic analysis ==
In historical phonology, the term "syncope" is often limited to the loss of an unstressed vowel, in effect collapsing the syllable that contained it: trisyllabic Latin calidus (stress on first syllable) develops as bisyllabic caldo in several Romance languages.

=== Loss of any sound ===
- Old English hlāfweard > hlāford > Middle English loverd > Modern English lord, pronounced /lɔːrd/
- English Worcester, pronounced /ˈwʊs.tə/
- English Gloucester, pronounced /ˈɡlɒs.tə/
- English Leicester, pronounced /ˈlɛs.tə/
- English Towcester, pronounced /ˈtoʊs.tə/
- English Godmanchester, pronounced /ˈɡʌms.tə/ (archaic)

=== Loss of unstressed vowel ===
- Latin cálidum > Italian caldo [ˈkaldo] "hot"
- Latin óculum > Italian occhio [ˈɔkkjo] "eye"
- Proto-Norse armaʀ > Old Norse armr "arm"
- Proto-Norse bókiʀ > Old Norse bǿkr "books"
- Proto-Germanic *himinōz > Old Norse himnar "heavens"

A syncope rule has been identified in Tonkawa, an extinct Native American language in which the second vowel of a word was deleted unless it was adjacent to a consonant cluster or a final consonant.

== See also ==
- Apheresis (linguistics)
- Apocope
- Clipping (morphology)
- Clipping (phonetics)
- Deletion (phonology)
- Elision
- Epenthesis, the addition of sounds to the interior of a word
- Poetic contraction
- Synaeresis
- Synalepha
- Syncopation in music
- Vowel reduction

== Sources ==
- Cockayne, T. Oswald (1854). "On certain instances of Synkope". Transactions of the Philological Society (11).
- Crowley, Terry (1997). An Introduction to Historical Linguistics (3rd ed.). New York: Oxford University Press. ISBN 0-19-558378-7.
