= Elision (French) =

Suppression of a final unstressed vowel

In French, elision (élision) is the suppression of a final unstressed vowel (usually /ə/) immediately before another word beginning with a vowel or a silent ⟨h⟩. The term also refers to the orthographic convention by which the deletion of a vowel is reflected in writing, and indicated with an apostrophe.

== Written French ==
In written French, elision (both phonetic and orthographic) is obligatory for the following words:

- the definite articles le and la
  - le garçon ("the boy"), la fille ("the girl")
  - le + arbre → l'arbre ("the tree"), la + église → l'église ("the church")
- the subject pronouns je and ce (when they occur before the verb)
  - Je dors. ("I sleep") Ce serait génial. ("That would be great.")
  - J'ai dormi. ("I slept.") C'était génial. ("It was great.")
  - but: Ai-je imaginé ? ("Did I imagine?"), Est-ce utile ? ("Is that useful?")
- the object pronouns me, te, se, le, and la (when they occur before the verb)
  - Jean se rase, la voit, me téléphone. ("Jean shaves himself, sees her, phones me.")
  - Jean s'est rasé, l'a vue, m'a téléphoné. ("Jean shaved himself, saw her, phoned me.")
  - but: Regarde-le encore une fois. ("Look at him one more time.")
- the object pronouns le, la, moi, toi when they occur after an imperative verb and before the pronoun en or y:
  - Mettez-le, donne-les-moi, casse-toi. ("Put it, give me them, scram.")
  - Mettez-l'y, donne-m'en, va-t'en. ("Put it there, give me some, leave.")
- the negative marker ne
  - Elle ne parle plus. ("She isn't talking anymore.")
  - Elle n'arrête pas de parler. ("She won't stop talking.")
- the preposition de
  - Le père de Jean vient de partir. ("Jean's father just left.")
  - Le père d'Albert vient d'arriver. ("Albert's father just arrived.")
- que (which has many different functions)
  - Que dis-tu ? Que Jean ne fait que manger. ("What are you saying? That Jean does nothing but eat.")
  - Qu'as-tu dit ? Qu'il ne nous restait plus qu'une semaine. ("What did you say? That we only had one more week left.")
- The conjunction si plus the pronouns il and ils
  - si elle aime les chats ("if she likes cats")
  - s'il(s) aime(nt) les chats ("if he/they like cats")

Elision is indicated in the spelling of some compound words, such as presqu'île "peninsula", aujourd'hui "today", and quelqu'un "someone".

At the beginnings of words, the aspirated h forbids elision. Example: Le Havre. The mute h, however, requires elision. Example: l'homme. Both types of "h" are silent regardless.

== Informal French ==
Elision of the second-person singular subject pronoun tu, before the verbs beginning with a vowel or mute h (silent h), and of the particle of negation ne, is very common in informal speech, but is avoided in careful speech and never used in formal writing:

- Tu as décidé de lui rendre visite, tu es allé voir le film, tu n'étais pas là, je ne sais pas. "You decided to visit them, you went to see the film, you were not there, I don't know." (careful speech)
- T'as décidé de lui rendre visite, t'es allé voir le film, t'étais pas là, je sais pas. (informal speech)

== See also ==
- Liaison (French)
- Elision — broader discussion of elision in other languages
