= Diaeresis (prosody) =

Concepts in poetic meter

In poetic meter, diaeresis (/daɪˈɛrəsɪs, -ˈɪər-/ dy-ERR-ə-siss, -EER-; also spelled diæresis or dieresis) has two meanings: the separate pronunciation of the two vowels in a diphthong for the sake of meter, and a division between feet that corresponds to the division between words.

Synaeresis, the pronunciation of two vowels as a diphthong (or as a long vowel), is the opposite of the first definition.

== Etymology ==
Diaeresis comes from the Ancient Greek noun diaíresis (διαίρεσις) "taking apart" or "division" (also "distinction"), from the verb diairéō (διαιρέω) "take apart", a compound of the verb airéō (αἱρέω) "take" and the preposition diá (διά) "through" (in compounds, "apart").

== French ==
In the phonology of Standard French, the letters ie are normally pronounced [je] or [jɛ] except after Cr or Cl, when they indicate two syllables, [ije] or [ijɛ]. (That exception came into the language only around the 17th century, as can be seen in poems before then.)

In some French dialects, however, diaeresis is the norm, with the two-syllable pronunciation found after any consonant. In Standard French, the pronunciation of hier (yesterday) varies between the two, [jɛʁ] or [ijɛʁ], depending on the context.

== Greek ==
Diaeresis as separate pronunciation of vowels in a diphthong was first named where it occurred in the poetry of Homer.

=== Example ===
- ἀλλά μοι ἀμφ᾿ Ὀδυσ**ῆϊ** δ**αΐ**φρονι δαίεται ῆτορ...
  But my soul is torn about Odysseus the fiery-hearted...

– Odyssey 1.48

In this example, diaereses are in bold. The vowels in each diaeresis are placed in separate syllables when the line is scanned:

- ΑΛ λα μοι • ΑΜ φο δυ • Σ**Η ι** δ**α • Ι**Φ ρο νι • ΔΑΙ ε ται • Η ΤΟΡ

Dactylic hexameter depends on the sequence of long and short (or heavy and light) syllables. It is composed of six feet, five of which are in two basic patterns: long–short–short (dactyl) or long–long (spondee).

In the scansion of the line above, long syllables are uppercase, short syllables are lowercase, and feet are divided by a vertical line. All feet in the line conform to one of the two patterns of dactylic hexameter.

If the pairs of vowels are contracted into diphthongs by synaeresis (i.e., Ὀδυσῇ δαίφρονι) and the diphthongs are placed in one syllable each, one foot (in red) no longer follows the patterns, no matter how the line is scanned:

- ΑΛ λα μοι • ΑΜ φο δυ • Σ**ΗΙ** • Δ**ΑΙ**Φ ρο νι • ΔΑΙ ε ται • Η ΤΟΡ
- ΑΛ λα μοι • ΑΜ φο δυ • Σ**ΗΙ** Δ**ΑΙ**Φ • ρο νι • ΔΑΙ ε ται • Η ΤΟΡ

=== Εὖ ===
In Homer, compounds beginning with ἐύ- (also spelled ἐΰ-, with a diaeresis or trema) frequently contain two separate vowels (diaeresis). In later Greek, the two vowels form a diphthong (synaeresis).

The word comes from εὖ "well", the adverbial use of the neuter accusative singular of the adjective ἐύς "good".

The form with diaeresis is the original form, since the word comes from Proto-Indo-European *esu (e-grade of ablaut), which is cognate with Sanskrit su- (zero-grade). In Proto-Greek, s between vowels became h (debuccalization), and later was lost.

== See also ==
- Synaeresis
- Vowel breaking
