= Crasis =

Vowel sandhi process

Crasis (/ˈkreɪsɪs/; from the Greek κρᾶσις, lit. 'mixing' or 'blending') is a type of contraction in which two vowels or diphthongs merge into one new vowel or diphthong, making one word out of two (univerbation). Crasis occurs in many languages, including French, Italian, Portuguese, and Spanish; it was first described in Ancient Greek.

In some cases, as in the French examples, crasis involves the grammaticalization of two individual lexical items into one. However, in other cases, like in the Greek examples, crasis is the orthographic representation of the encliticization and the vowel reduction of one grammatical form with another. The difference between them is that the Greek examples involve two grammatical words and a single phonological word, but the French examples involve a single phonological word and grammatical word.

== Greek ==
In both Ancient and Modern Greek, crasis merges a small word and long word that are closely connected in meaning. (Note: Note that crasis in English usually refers to the merging of words, but the sense of the word in the original Greek was more general and referred to most changes related to vowel contraction, including synaeresis.)

In Ancient Greek, a coronis (κορωνίς korōnís "curved"; plural κορωνίδες korōnídes) marks the vowel from crasis. In ancient times, it was an apostrophe placed after the vowel (τα᾽μά), but it is now written over the vowel (τἀμά) and is identical to smooth breathing in Unicode. (For instance, τἀμά uses the character U+1F00 ἀ GREEK SMALL LETTER ALPHA WITH PSILI; psili means smooth breathing.) Unlike a coronis, smooth breathing never occurs on a vowel in the middle of a word although it occurs in a doubled rho: πύῤῥος pyrrhos.

The article undergoes crasis with nouns and adjectives that start with a vowel:

- τὰ ἐμά → τᾱ̓μά "my (affairs)"
- τὸ ἐναντίον → τοὐναντίον "on the contrary"
- τὸ αὐτό → ταὐτό "the same"
- τὰ αὐτά → ταὐτά (plural of the previous example)

καί undergoes crasis with the first-person singular pronoun and produces a long vowel:

- καὶ ἐγώ → κᾱ̓γώ "and I", "I too"
- καὶ ἐμοί → κᾱ̓μοί "and to me"

In the modern monotonic orthography, the coronis is not written.

== Italian ==
In Italian, crasis occurs between the prepositions a, da, di, in, con, su, per and the singular masculine definite article il or in fewer cases with the plural masculine definite articles i and gli.

- a il → al
- da il → dal
- di il → del
- in il → nel
- con il → col
- con i → coi
- su il → sul
- per il → pel (archaic)
- per i → pei (archaic)
- per gli → pegli (archaic)

== French ==
In French, the contractions of determiners are often the results of a vocalisation and a crasis:

- de le → du, de les → des
- à le → au, à les → aux
- en les → ès (archaic)

In colloquial Québécois French, crasis extends to form further words.

- à + la → à
- sur + la → s'a
- sur + les → s'es
- il + est → yé

== Portuguese ==
The most frequently-observed crasis is now the contraction of the preposition a ("to" or "at") with the feminine singular definite article a ("the"), indicated in writing with a grave accent or the masculine singular definite article o (also "the"). For example, instead of *Vou a a praia ("I go to the beach"), one says Vou à praia ("I go to-the beach"). The contraction turns the clitic a into the stressed word à. Meanwhile, a person going to a bank, a supermarket or a marketplace would say respectively Vou ao banco, Vou ao supermercado or Vou à feira.

Crasis also occurs between the preposition a and demonstrative such as when the preposition precedes aquele(s), aquela(s) (meaning "that", "those", in different genders), which contract to àquele(s), àquela(s). The accent marks a secondary stress in Portuguese.

In addition, the crasis à is pronounced lower as /a/ than the article or preposition a, as /ɐ/, in the examples in standard European Portuguese, but the qualitative distinction is not made by most speakers in Brazilian Portuguese (some dialects, like Rio de Janeiro's fluminense, are exceptions and make the distinction).

Crasis is very important since it can change the meaning of a sentence:

- Exposta, a polícia - The police is exposed
- Exposta à polícia - She is exposed to the police
- Glória, a rainha - Glória the queen (In this case, "Glória" is a proper noun).
- Glória à rainha - Glory to the queen (It can be spoken in the imperative with a different intonation. Glory to the Queen can mean that people are "ordering" that "Glory", a proper noun, be the queen.)
- Dê a mulher - Give the woman
- Dê à mulher - Give to the woman

These rules determine whether crasis always applies or whether one may use the contraction à (with an accent) instead of the preposition a (without an accent):

Replace the preposition a by another preposition, as em ("in") or para ("to"). If after replacement, the definite article a ("the") is still possible, crasis applies:

- Pedro viajou à Região Nordeste: with a grave accent because it equivalent to "Pedro traveled 'to the' Northeast Region". Here, para a Região Nordeste could also be used.
- O autor dedicou o livro a/à sua esposa: with an optional grave accent in Portuguese, depending on the dialect, as in some specific dialects the article (a) is not needed before a possessive adjective (sua). Therefore, the rave accent is a purely stylistical choice, not changing the meaning at all. However, if the possessive adjective becomes a pronoun "volte a/à sua casa, não venha mais à minha" (go back to your home, and dont come to mine anymore), the grave accent is necessary. Also, if the a before the possessive adjective does not match its number ("mostrei a nossas colegas") there can not be crasis, as it needs the preposition 'a' and an article/pronoun starting by a (the crasis would be necessary if it were an 'às', 'a' + 'as' ("mostrei às nossas colegas")).

If the nominal complement is changed after "a" from a feminine noun to a masculine noun, and it is now necessary to use 'ao' as used naturally by native speakers, crasis applies:

- Prestou relevantes serviços à comunidade, He/she paid outstanding services to the community: with a grave accent because if the object is changed to a masculine noun ("Prestou relevantes serviços ao povo" He/she paid outstanding services to the people), "ao" ("to [masculine] the") is now used.
- "Chegarei daqui a uma hora" I will arrive in an hour: without crasis because when the feminine noun is changed to a masculine noun ("Chegarei daqui a um minuto" I will arrive in a minute), there is no "ao" (as "um/uma", indefinite articles, appear instead of "o/a").

The grave accent is never used before masculine words (nouns, pronouns, etc.); verbs; personal pronouns; numerals, plural nouns without the use of the feminine plural definite article as ("the"); city names that do not use a feminine article; the word casa ("house") if it has the meaning of one's own home; the word terra ("earth") when it has the meaning of soil; and indefinite, personal, relative or demonstrative pronouns (except the third person and aquele(s) or aquela(s)); between identical nouns such as dia a dia "day by day", "everyday", "daily life", gota a gota "dropwise", "drip", and cara a cara "face to face"; and after prepositions. Here are some exceptions:

- É preciso declarar guerra à guerra! (It is necessary to declare war on war!)
- É preciso dar mais vida à vida. (It is necessary to give more life to life.)

Crasis also occurs between the prepositions de, em and por and the definite articles.

- de o → do
- de a → da
- de os → dos
- de as → das
- em o → no
- em a → na
- em os → nos
- em as → nas
- por o → pelo
- por a → pela
- por os → pelos
- por as → pelas

=== Optional crasis ===
The grave accent is optional in the following cases:

- Before a female's first name
  Refiro-me [à/a] Fernanda. (I am referring to Fernanda.)
- Before a feminine possessive pronoun
  Dirija-se [à/a] sua fazenda. (Go to your [own] farm.)
- After the preposition até
  Dirija-se até [à/a] porta. (Go by that door.)
  Eu fui até [à/a] França de carro. (I traveled to France by car.)

== Spanish ==
In Spanish, crasis occurs between the prepositions a or de and the masculine definite article el.

- a el → al
- de el → del

== See also ==
- Assimilation (linguistics)
- Clitic
- Contraction (grammar)
- Elision
- Liaison (French)
- Sandhi
- Synalepha
