= Apocope =

Loss of word-final sounds

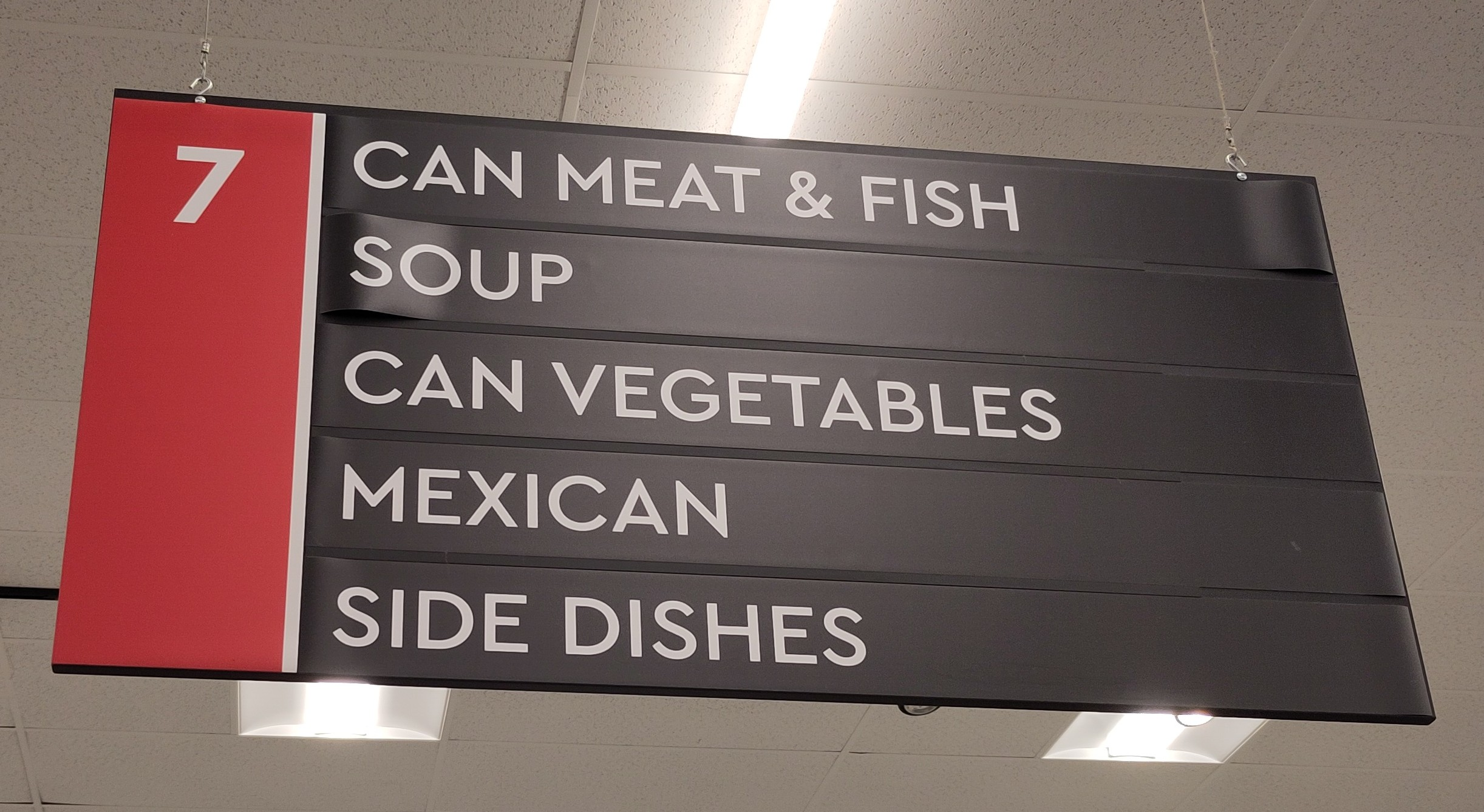
Supermarket aisle sign in Calgary, Canada showing apocope of -ed in etymological canned meat and canned vegetables

In phonology, apocope (/əˈpɒkəpi/ ə-POCK-ə-pee) (Note: "Apocope". Oxford Dictionaries UK English Dictionary. Oxford University Press. Archived from the original on December 5, 2021.) is the omission (elision) or loss of a sound or sounds at the end of a word. While it most commonly refers to the loss of a final vowel, it can also describe the deletion of final consonants or even entire syllables.

For instance, in much spoken English, the t in the word don't is lost in the phrase I don't know, leading to the written representation I dunno.

The resulting word form after apocope has occurred is called an apocopation.

== Etymology ==
Apocope comes from the Greek ἀποκοπή (apokopḗ) from ἀποκόπτειν (apokóptein) 'cutting off', from ἀπο- (apo-) 'away from' and κόπτειν (kóptein) 'to cut'.

== Historical sound change ==
In historical linguistics, the term apocope is often used to refer to the systemic loss of final unstressed vowels and/or nasal consonants as part of a regular sound-change. This kind of apocope often entails change to or loss of inflexional endings.

=== Examples of the loss of an unstressed vowel and/or nasal consonant ===
- Latin mare → Portuguese mar (sea)
- Latin pānem → Spanish pan (bread)
- Latin lupum → French loup (wolf)
- Latin cīvitātem → Italian città (city)
- Proto-Germanic *landą → Old, Middle, and Modern English land
- Old English lufu → Modern English love (noun)
- Old English lufian → Modern English love (verb)
- The loss of a final unstressed vowel is a feature of southern dialects of Māori in comparison to standard Māori, for example the term kainga (village) is rendered in southern Māori as kaik. A similar feature is seen in the Gallo-Italic languages.
- Proto-Finnic *litna → Estonian linn (city)
- Proto-Finnic *litnan → Estonian linna (city's)
- Colloquial Finnish suomeksi → suomeks (in Finnish)

=== Examples of the loss of other sounds ===
- Non-rhotic English accents, including British Received Pronunciation, suppress the final r in each syllable (except when it is followed by a vowel). (In most accents, the suppressed r lengthens or modifies the preceding vowel.)
- French pronunciation suppresses the final consonant of most words (but it is normally pronounced as a liaison at the beginning of the following word in the sentence if the latter word begins with a vowel or with an unaspirated 'h').

== Grammatical rule ==
Some languages have apocopations that are internalized as mandatory forms. In Spanish, for example, some adjectives that come before the noun lose the final vowel or syllable if they precede a noun (mainly) in the masculine singular form. In Spanish, some adverbs and cardinal and ordinal numbers have apocopations as well.

- Adjectives
  - grande ("big, great") → gran → gran mujer (feminine) ("great woman". However, if the adjective follows the noun, the final syllable remains, but the meaning may also change: mujer grande, meaning "large woman")
  - bueno ("good") → buen → buen hombre (masculine) ("good man"; the final vowel remains in hombre bueno, with no accompanying change in meaning)
- Adverbs
  - tanto ("so much") → tan ("so") → tan hermoso ("so beautiful")
- Cardinal numbers
  - uno ("one, a, an") → un → un niño ("a child")
  - ciento ("hundred") → cien → Cien años de soledad ("One hundred years of solitude")
- Ordinal numbers
  - primero ("first") → primer → primer premio ("first prize")
  - segundo ("second, according to") → segund ("according to") → según → El evangelio según ("The Gospel according to")
  - tercero ("third") → tercer → tercer lugar ("third place")
  - postrero ("final") → postrer → postrer día ("final day")

== Economy of expression ==
Apocope can also refer to the shortening of words for economy. This is common in nicknames, such as William → Will or Margery → Marge, but occurs in other words, such as fanatic → fan and laboratory → lab.

== See also ==
- Abbreviation
- Acronym and initialism
- Apheresis (linguistics)
- Clipping (morphology)
- Contraction (grammar)
- Elision
- Syncope (phonetics)
