= Vowel hiatus =

Syllabic separation of two adjacent vowels

In phonology, hiatus (/haɪˈeɪtəs/ hy-AY-təs) or diaeresis (/daɪˈɛrəsɪs, -ˈɪər-/ dy-ERR-ə-siss, -EER-; also spelled dieresis or diæresis) describes the occurrence of two separate vowel sounds in adjacent syllables with no intervening consonant. When two vowel sounds instead occur together as part of a single syllable, the result is called a diphthong.

== Preference ==
Some languages do not have diphthongs, except sometimes in rapid speech, or they have a limited number of diphthongs but also numerous vowel sequences that cannot form diphthongs and so appear in hiatus. That is the case for Nuosu, Bantu languages like Swahili, and Lakota. An example is Swahili eua 'purify' with three syllables.

== Avoidance ==
Many languages disallow or restrict hiatus and avoid it by deleting or assimilating the vowel sound or by adding an extra consonant sound.

=== Epenthesis ===
A consonant sound may be added between vowels (epenthesis) to prevent hiatus. That is most often a semivowel or a glottal, but all kinds of other consonants can be used as well, depending on the language and the quality of the two adjacent vowels. Epenthesis can be seen for instance with intrusive R in multiple varieties of English, in which an R sound is inserted where there is no written R, in order to avoid vowel hiatus. Additionally, some non-rhotic dialects of English often insert a rhotic (/r/) to avoid hiatus after non-high word-final or occasionally morpheme-final vowels, in a process known as linking R.

=== Contraction ===
In Greek and Latin poetry, hiatus is generally avoided although it occurs in many authors under certain rules, with varying degrees of poetic licence. Hiatus may be avoided by elision of a final vowel, occasionally prodelision (elision of initial vowel), synizesis (pronunciation of two vowels as one without change in spelling), or contractions such as αει->ᾷ.

=== Glide formation ===
The first of the two vowels may be converted to a glide to prevent hiatus. This differs from epenthesis as described above, since only one of the two vowels is retained in its original form. For example, in Luganda, /muiko/ is realised as [mwiːk.o]. In some cases, this may result in the transfer of accent and/or length from the first to the second vowel, e.g. Icelandic sjá ← *sé + a.

== Transcription ==
When necessary to indicate a hiatus, either for general clarity or to distinguish it from a diphthong, the International Phonetic Alphabet uses a period ⟨.⟩ to indicate the syllable break. For example, lower can be transcribed ⟨ˈloʊ.ɚ⟩, with a period separating the first syllable, ⟨loʊ⟩, from the second syllable, ⟨ɚ⟩.

== Marking ==
=== Diaeresis ===
In Dutch and French, the second of two vowels in hiatus is marked with a diacritic (or tréma) if otherwise that combination could be interpreted as a single vowel (namely either a diphthong, a long vowel, or as having one of the vowels silent, etc.). Examples are the Dutch word poëzie ("poetry") and the French word ambiguë (feminine form of ambigu, "ambiguous"). This usage is occasionally seen in English (such as coöperate, daïs and reëlect) but has never been common, and over the last century, its use in such words has been dropped or replaced by the use of a hyphen except in a very few publications, notably The New Yorker. It is, however, still sometimes seen in loanwords such as naïve and Noël and in the proper names Zoë and Chloë.

=== Other ways ===
In German, hiatus between monophthongs is usually written with an intervening h, as in ziehen [ˈtsiː.ən] "to pull"; drohen [ˈdʁoː.ən] "to threaten"; sehen [ˈzeː.ən] "to see". In a few words (such as ziehen), the h represents a consonant that has become silent, but in most cases, it was added later simply to indicate the end of the stem. In colloquial speech the examples above drop the second syllable schwa altogether: ziehen [ˈtsiːn], drohen [ˈdʁoːn], sehen [ˈzeːn].

Similarly, in Scottish Gaelic, hiatus is written by a number of digraphs: bh, dh, gh, mh, th. Some examples include abhainn [ˈa.ɪɲ] "river"; latha [ˈl̪ˠa.ə] "day"; cumha [ˈkʰũ.ə] "condition". The convention goes back to the Old Irish scribal tradition, but it is more consistently applied in Scottish Gaelic: lathe (> latha). However, hiatus in Old Irish was usually simply implied in certain vowel digraphs óe (> adha), ua (> ogha).

== Correption ==
Correption is the shortening of a long vowel before a short vowel in hiatus.

== See also ==
- Diphthong
- Synaeresis
- Elision
- Movable nu
