= Elision =

Omission of sounds in words or phrases

In linguistics, an elision or deletion is the omission of one or more sounds (such as a vowel, a consonant, or a whole syllable) in a word or phrase. However, these terms are also used to refer more narrowly to cases where two words are run together by the omission of a final sound. An example is the elision of word-final /t/ in English if it is preceded and followed by a consonant: "first light" is often pronounced "firs' light" (/fɜrs laɪt/). Many other terms are used to refer to specific cases where sounds are omitted.

== Citation forms and contextual forms ==
A word may be spoken individually in what is called the citation form. This corresponds to the pronunciation given in a dictionary. However, when words are spoken in context, it often happens that some sounds that belong to the citation form are omitted. Elision is not an all-or-nothing process: elision is more likely to occur in some styles of speaking and less likely in others. Many writers have described the styles of speech in which elision is most commonly found, using terms such as "casual speech", "spontaneous speech", "allegro speech" or "rapid speech". In addition, what may appear to be the disappearance of a sound may in fact be a change in the articulation of a sound that makes it less audible. For example, it has been said that in some dialects of Spanish the word-final -ado, as in cansado (tired) is pronounced /ado/ in citation form but the /d/ is omitted in normal speech, giving "cansao". More careful description will show that the Spanish phoneme /d/ is usually pronounced as a voiced dental fricative [ð] when it occurs between vowels. In casual speech it is frequently weakened to a voiced dental approximant [ð̞]. The most extreme possibility is complete elision resulting in a diphthong with no observable consonantal tongue gesture. In this view, elision is the final stage in lenition or consonant weakening, the last phase of a cline or continuum describable as d > ð > ð̞ > ∅. Whether the elision is of vowel or consonant, if it is consistent through time, the form with elision may come to be accepted as the norm: tabula > tabla as in Spanish, mutare > muer ("change, molt") in French, luna > lua ("moon") in Portuguese. It is usual to explain elision and related connected-speech phenomena in terms of the principle of least effort or "economy of effort". This concept has been stated as "If a word or expression remains perfectly intelligible without a certain sound, people tend to omit that sound."

== Historical elisions ==
There are various ways in which the present form of a language may reflect elisions that have taken place in the past. This topic is an area of diachronic linguistics. Such elisions may originally have been optional but have over time become obligatory (or mandatory). An example of historical elision in French that began at the phrasal level and became lexicalized is preposition de > d' in aujourd'hui "today", now felt by native speakers to be one word, but deriving from au jour de hui, literally "at the day of today" and meaning "nowadays", although hui is no longer recognized as meaningful in French. In English, the word "cupboard" would originally have contained /p/ between /ʌ/ and /b/, but the /p/ is believed to have disappeared from the pronunciation of the word about the fifteenth century.

== Contractions ==
In many languages there is a process similar but not identical to elision, called contraction, where common words that occur frequently together form a shortened pronunciation. This may be a historical case (for example, French "ce est" has become "c'est" /sɛ/ and it would now be incorrect to say "ce est" /sə ɛ/) or one that is still optional (in English, a speaker may say "that is" /ðæt ɪz/ or "that's" /ðæts/). Contractions of both sorts are natural forms of the language used by native speakers and are often colloquial but not considered substandard. English contractions are usually vowel-less weak form words. In some cases the contracted form is not a simple matter of elision: for example, "that's" as a contraction is made not only by the elision of the /ɪ/ of "is" but also by the change of final consonant from /z/ to /s/; "won't" for "will not" requires not only the elision of the /ɒ/ of "not" but also the vowel change /ɪ/ → /oʊ/ and in English RP "can't" and "shan't" change vowel from /æ/ of "can" and "shall" to /ɑː/ in /kɑːnt/, /ʃɑːnt/. In some languages employing the Latin alphabet, such as English, the omitted letters in a contraction are replaced by an apostrophe (e.g., isn't for is not). Written Greek marks elisions in the same way.

== Elision in poetry ==
Elision is frequently found in verse. It is sometimes explicitly marked in the spelling, and in other cases has to be inferred from knowledge of the metre. Elisions occurred regularly in Latin, but were not written, except in inscriptions and comedy. Elision of a vowel before a word starting in a vowel (synalepha) is frequent in both Latin and English poetry, and is generally part of the metrical scheme.

There are many examples of poetic contraction in English verse marked by spelling and punctuation. Frequently found examples are over > o'er and ever > e'er. Three examples can be seen in the following two lines from Gray's "Elegy Written in a Country Churchyard" (1751):

- Th' applause of list'ning senates to command
- He gain'd from heav'n ('twas all he wish'd) a friend

Gray's coalescing of "the applause" into "th' applause" is an example of synalepha; while he wrote the invariably one-syllable words "gained" and "wished" with apostrophes merely to aid the reader.

== Deletion ==
The term deletion is used in some modern work instead of elision. When contemporary or historic deletion is treated in terms of Generative phonology it is usual to explain the process as one of substituting zero for a phoneme, in the form of a phonological rule. The form of such rules is typically

X --> ∅ (i.e. the segment x becomes zero)

An example of a deletion rule (for /r/-deletion in English RP) is provided by Giegerich. If we start with the premise that the underlying form of the word "hear" has a final /r/ and has the phonological form /hɪər/, we need to be able to explain how /r/ is deleted at the end of "hear" but is not deleted in the derived word "hearing". The difference is between word-final /r/ in "hear", where the /r/ would form part of the rhyme of a syllable, and word-medial /r/ which would form the onset of the second syllable of "hearing". The following rule deletes /r/ in "hear", giving /hɪə/, but does not apply in the case of "hearing", giving /hɪərɪŋ/.

                rhyme
    /r/ --> ∅/  _____

== Examples ==
=== English ===
Examples of elision in English:

Word	IPA before elision	IPA after elision
natural	/ˈnætʃərəl/	/ˈnætʃrəl/
laboratory (British English)	/ləˈbɒrətəri/	/ləˈbɒrətri/
laboratory (American English)	/ˈlæbərətɔːri/	/ˈlæbrətɔːri/
temperature	/ˈtɛmpərətʃər/	/ˈtɛmpərtʃər/, /ˈtɛmprətʃər/, sometimes /ˈtɛmpətʃər/
family	/ˈfæmɪli/	/ˈfæmli/
vegetable	/ˈvɛdʒətəbəl/	/ˈvɛdʒtəbəl/ or devoiced into /ˈvɛtʃtəbəl/
fifth	/ˈfɪfθ/	/ˈfɪθ/
him	/hɪm/	/ɪm/
going to	/ˈɡoʊ.ɪŋ tə/ (before consonants), /ˈɡoʊ.ɪŋ tuː/ (elsewhere)	/ɡənə/ (gonna)
it is, it has	/ɪt ˈɪz/, /ɪt ˈhæz/	/ɪts/ (it's)
I have	/aɪ ˈhæv/	/aɪv/ (I've)
is not	/ɪzˈnɒt/	/ˈɪzənt/ (isn't)

Most elisions in English are not mandatory, but they are used in common practice and even sometimes in more formal speech. This applies to nearly all the examples in the above table. However, these types of elisions are rarely shown in modern writing and never shown in formal writing. In formal writing, the words are written the same whether or not the speaker would elide them, but in many plays and classic American literature, words are often written with an elision to demonstrate accent:

"Well, we ain't got any," George exploded. "Whatever we ain't got, that's what you want. God a'mighty, if I was alone I could live so easy. I could go get a job an' work, an' no trouble. No mess at all, and when the end of the month come I could take my fifty bucks and go into town and get whatever I want. Why, I could stay in a cathouse all night. I could eat any place I want, hotel or any place, and order any damn thing I could think of. An' I could do all that every damn month. Get a gallon of whisky, or set in a pool room and play cards or shoot pool." Lennie knelt and looked over the fire at the angry George. And Lennie's face was drawn in with terror. "An' whatta I got," George went on furiously. "I got you! You can't keep a job and you lose me ever' job I get. Jus' keep me shovin' all over the country all the time."

— John Steinbeck, Of Mice and Men 1937, 1.89

Other examples, such as him and going to shown in the table above, are generally used only in fast or informal speech. They are still generally written as is unless the writer intends to show the dialect or speech patterns of the speaker.

The third type of elision is in common contractions, such as can't, isn't, or I'm. The apostrophes represent the sounds that are removed and are not spoken but help the reader to understand that it is a contraction and not a word of its own. These contractions used to be written out when transcribed (i.e. cannot, is not, I am) even if they were pronounced as a contraction, but now they are always written as a contraction so long as they are spoken that way. However, they are by no means mandatory and a speaker or writer may choose to keep the words distinct rather than contract them either as a stylistic choice, when using formal register, to make meaning clearer to children or non-native English speakers, or to emphasize a word within the contraction (e.g. I am going!)

In non-rhotic accents of English, /r/ is dropped unless followed by a vowel, making cheetah and cheater completely homophonous. In non-rhotic accents spoken outside of North America, many instances of /ɑː/ correspond to /ɑːr/ in North American English as /æ/ and /ɒ/ are used instead of /ɑː/.

=== Finnish ===
The consonant in the partitive case ending -ta elides when it is surrounded by two short vowels except when the first of the two vowels involved is paragoge (added to the stem). Otherwise, it stays. For example, katto+ta → kattoa, ranta+ta → rantaa, but työ+tä → työtä (not a short vowel), mies+ta → miestä (consonant stem), jousi+ta → jousta (paragogic i on a consonant stem).

=== French ===
Elision of unstressed vowels (usually /ə/) is common in the French language and, in some cases, must be indicated orthographically with an apostrophe.

Elision of vowel and consonant sounds was also an important phenomenon in the phonological evolution of French. For example, s following a vowel and preceding another consonant regularly elided, with compensatory lengthening of the vowel.

- Latin hospitāle → Old French (h)ostel → Modern French hôtel
- Latin spatha → Old French espee → Modern French épée
- Latin schola → Old French escole → Modern French école

=== German ===
Nouns and adjectives that end with unstressed "el" or "er" have the "e" elided when they are declined or a suffix follows. ex. teuer becomes teure, teuren, etc., and Himmel + -isch becomes himmlisch.

The final e of a noun is also elided when another noun or suffix is concatenated onto it: Strafe + Gesetzbuch becomes Strafgesetzbuch.

In both of the above cases, the e represents a schwa.

=== Icelandic ===
Elision (brottfall) is common in Icelandic. There are a variety of rules for its occurrence, but the most notable is the loss of trailing consonants in common particles as well as the merger of similar vowel sounds. For example, the ubiquitous ég er að (verb) structure ("I am verb-ing") becomes transformed to éra (verb); the full particles are only spoken when sounding the sentence out word by word. Another noteworthy and extremely common example along this line includes the phrase er það ekki? ("really?"), which is pronounced as erþakki. A common example of internal consonant loss in Icelandic is gerðu svo vel ("here you go", "please"), pronounced gjersovel (the hidden j sound is unrelated to the elision and occurs when a /kʰ/ or /k/ precedes /ɛ, i, ɪ, ai/). Another special case of elision is the loss of /θ/ from the start of þetta ("this", "that"), which is sometimes pronounced etta (hvað er þetta (what is this?) -> hvaretta?). The pronunciation of the full word tends to lay emphasis on it ("What is this?") while the elision of the word leads to its deemphasis ("What is this?"). The loss of the /θ/ in þetta is similar to how /ð/ can be lost in "that" and "this" when asking a question and speaking swiftly in English.

=== Irish ===
Elision is found in the Ulster dialect of Irish, particularly in final position. Iontach, for example, while pronounced [ˈiːntəx] in the Conamara dialect, is pronounced [ˈintə] in Ulster. n is also elided when it begins intervocalic consonant clusters. Anró is pronounced aró; muintir is pronounced muitir.

=== Japanese ===
Elision is extremely common in the pronunciation of the Japanese language. In general, a high vowel (/i/ or /u/) that appears in a low-pitched syllable between two voiceless consonants is devoiced and often deleted outright. However, unlike French or English, Japanese does not often show elision in writing. The process is purely phonetic and varies considerably depending on the dialect or level of formality. A few examples (slightly exaggerated; apostrophes added to indicate elision):

松下さんはいますか？ Matsushita-san wa imasu ka? ("Is Mr. Matsushita in?")
Pronounced: matsush'tasanwa imas'ka
IPA: [matsɯɕi̥tasaɰ̃wa imasɯ̥ka]

失礼します Shitsurei shimasu ("Excuse me")
Pronounced: sh'tsureishimas'
IPA: [ɕi̥tsɯɾeː ɕimasɯ̥]

Gender roles also influence elision in Japanese. It is considered masculine to elide, especially the final u of the polite verb forms (-masu, desu), but women are traditionally encouraged to do the opposite. However, excessive elision is generally associated with lower prestige, and inadequate elision is seen as overly fussy or old-fashioned. Some nonstandard dialects, such as Satsuma-ben, are known for their extensive elision.

It is common for successive o sounds to be reduced to a single o sound, as is frequently encountered when the particle を (wo/o) is followed by the beautifying or honorific お (o).

=== Latin ===
Latin poetry featured frequent elision, with syllables being dropped to fit the meter or for euphony. Words ending in vowels would elide with the following word if it started with a vowel or h; words ending with -m would also be elided in the same way (this is called ecthlipsis). In writing, unlike in Greek, this would not be shown, with the normal spelling of the word represented. For instance, line 5 of Virgil's Aeneid is written as "multa quoque et bello passus, dum conderet urbem", even though it would be pronounced as "multa quoquet bello passus, dum conderet urbem".

It is generally thought that elision in Latin poetry came from ordinary Latin pronunciation. However, at some points in speech where elision was standard in poetry, such as at the end of sentences, there was no elision in prose. Around 30 B.C., there was a sharp decline in the amount of elision. Later revived to a varying degree during the Silver Age, it then declined again.

Other examples of elision in Latin literature include:

- Virgil's Aeneid Book I, Line 3: "litora, multum ille et terris iactatus et alto " is pronounced "litora, multillet terris iactatus et alto ", where "multillet " comprises three long syllables, or one and a half spondees.
- Virgil's Aeneid Book I, Line 11: "impulerit. tantaene animis caelestibus irae? " is pronounced "impulerit. tantaenanimis caelestibus irae? ", where "tantaenanimis " comprises three long syllables and two short syllables.
- Ovid's Metamorphoses Book III, Line 557: "quem quidem ego actutum (modo vos absistite) cogam " is pronounced "quem quidegactutum (modo vos absistite) cogam ", where "quidegactutum " comprises two short syllables and a long syllable.
- Ovid's Amores Book III, Poem VI, Line 101: "Huic ego, vae! demens narrabam fluminum amores! " is pronounced "Huic ego, vae! demens narrabam fluminamores! ".
- Catullus 73 line 6, "quam modo qui me unum atque unicum amicum habuit", has elision connecting the final six words together.
- Caecilius Statius's Ephesio (quoted in Cicero's Cato Maior de Senectute 25) has the line: "Sentire ea aetate eumpse esse odiosum alteri" where there is elision between every word.
- A line from Lucilius (600 Marx; 728 Warmington) similarly has elision connecting all its words: "frigore inluvie inbalnitie inperfunditie incuria".

In a study of elision in Latin poetry, J. Soubiran argues that "elision" would better be called "synaloepha", and the process understood as a merging of syllables, in most cases, rather than the loss of one.

=== Maori ===
Medial /t/ is sometimes dropped: the prefix Ngāti (from ngā āti "descendants") applied to tribes can also be realised as Ngāi, motu ("island") can also be realised as mou (e.g. Moutohorā, lit. 'Whale Island').

=== Malayalam ===
Dropping sounds in connected speech by native speakers is very common in this language from Kerala, southern India. For example, entha becomes ntha and ippol becomes ippo.

=== Spanish ===
The change of Latin into the Romance languages included a significant amount of elision, especially syncope (loss of medial vowels). Spanish has these examples:

- tabla from Latin tabula
- isla from Latin insula (through *isula)
- alma from Latin anima (with dissimilation of -nm- to -lm-)
- hembra from Latin femina (with lenition of f- to h- to ∅, dissimilation of -mn- to -mr- and then epenthesis of -mr- to -mbr-)

In addition, speakers often employ crasis or elision between two words to avoid a hiatus caused by vowels: the choice of which to use depends upon whether or not the vowels are identical. This is referred to as enlace or synalepha, and is especially common in poetry and songs. It is not necessarily indicated in writing, but often is in hymn music. It can appear as a breve below or an underscore between the adjacent words, e.g. "por-que ̮en-ton-ces" or "por-que_en-ton-ces".

A frequent informal use is the elision of d in the past participle suffix -ado, pronouncing cansado as cansao. The elision of d in -ido is considered even more informal, but both elisions common in Andalusian Spanish. Thus, the Andalusian quejío for quejido ("lament") has entered Standard Spanish as a term for a special feature of Flamenco singing. Similar distinctions are made with the words bailaor(a) and cantaor(a) as contracted versions of the literal translations for dancer and singer exclusively used for Flamenco, compared to the bailarín and cantante of standard Spanish. The perceived vulgarity of the silent d may lead to hypercorrections like *bacalado for bacalao (cod) or *Bilbado for Bilbao.

=== Tamil ===
Tamil has a set of rules for elision. They are categorised into classes based on the phoneme where elision occurs:

Class name	Phoneme
Kutriyalukaram	u
Kutriyalikaram	i
Aiykaarakkurukkam	ai
Oukaarakkurukkam	au
Aaythakkurukkam	the special character akh
Makarakkurukkam	m

=== Urdu ===
In Pakistan, elision has become very common in speech. Commonly used words have single consonants or syllables removed in casual speech and it is becoming more acceptable in formal settings due to an increasing understandability and use. Although not seen when writing in the Urdu script (Nastaleeq), it is often seen in Roman Urdu (Latin alphabet) as the latter is more similar to vernacular Urdu. Most elisions occur by removing a vowel or the consonant /h/ or a combination of the two. Some widely used examples are:

Elision	Original	Original (Urdu)	Translation
Re	Rahe	رہے	Remain/(Present Participle)
Thīkai	Thīk Hai	ٹھیک ہے	Alright/Okay
Ai	Hai	ہے	Is
Xāmaxā	Xāh Maxāh	خواہ مخواہ	Gratuitously

In sentences, they may appear as:

Kyā tum paṛ re o? ("Are you studying?") instead of "Kyā tum paṛh rahe ho?"

Variations are also common where some individuals may prefer to pronounce a complete word while shortening the rest, depending on the preference of the person, their dialect, or their accent.

=== Welsh ===
Elision is a major feature of Welsh, found commonly in verb forms, such as in the following examples:

- Ydych chi'n (chi yn) hoffi'r (hoffi yr) coffi? - 'Do you like the coffee?' (The definite article is always 'r after a vowel even when the next word begins with a consonant, e.g. Mae'r gath yn sgramo - 'the cat is scratching', but y gath ddu - 'the black cat'.
- Ble mae'r (mae yr) dre? - 'Where is the town?'
- (Ry)dw i'n (i yn) darllen. - 'I am reading'

Elision of word-final -f is almost always found in spoken Welsh to the point where the words are spelt with optional final -f in words like gorsa(f), pentre(f) and has been eradicated from the inflected prepositions: arna i, not *arnaf i - 'on me', etc. These always retain their final -f in the literary register, however.

Welsh also displays elision of initial syllables in singular/plural or collective/singulative pairs where the plural or singulative becomes longer than two syllables. This, however, is now restricted to specific nouns and is not productive. E.g. hosan / sanau - 'sock / socks' where the initial ho- has been lost in the plural; adar / deryn - 'birds / a bird' where the initial a- has been lost in the singulative.

== Related areas ==
- Aphaeresis
- Apocope
- Clipping (morphology)
- Cluster reduction
- Contraction
- Crasis
- Disemvoweling
- Elision in the French language
- Haplology
- Lacuna
- Lenition
- Poetic contraction
- Prodelision
- Sandhi
- Synaeresis
- Synalepha
- Syncope
- Synizesis
- Vowel reduction
- Weak form words
