= Apheresis (linguistics) =

Loss of the vowel at the beginning of a word

In phonetics and phonology, apheresis (/əˈfɛrɪsɪs, əˈfɪərɪsɪs/; British English: aphaeresis) is a sound change in which a word-initial vowel is lost, e.g., American →'Merican. In a broader sense, it can refer to the loss of any initial sound (including consonants) from a word or, in a less technical sense, to the loss of one or more sounds from the beginning of a word. The more specific term aphesis (and its adjective aphetic) is sometimes used to refer to the loss of unstressed vowels.

== Etymology ==
The term apheresis, attested since at least 1550 in English, comes from Latin aphaeresis, from Greek ἀφαίρεσις aphairesis, "taking away" from ἀφαιρέω aphaireo from ἀπό apo, "away" and αἱρέω haireo, "to take".

The hyponyms aphesis (/ˈæfəsɪs/) and aphetic, coined in 1880 by James Murray, are inspired by Greek ἄφεσις aphesis, "letting go" from ἀφίημι aphiemi from ἀπό apo, "away" and ἵημι híemi, "send forth".

== Historical sound change ==
=== Loss of unstressed vowel ===
- Greek: epískopos → Vulgar Latin: *(e)biscopus → Old English: bisceop 'bishop'
- English: acute→cute
- English: because → informal 'cause
- Middle English: Egipcien → gipcyan, gipsen 'Gypsy'
- English: alone → lone
- English: amend → mend
- Old French: e(s)vanisse → Middle English: vanisshen 'vanish'

=== Loss of any sound ===
- English: [k]nife → /ˈnaɪf/
- Portuguese: está →colloquial tá
- Proto-Norse: *[st]randa→ Swedish: strand → Finnish: ranta 'beach'
- Latin: Hispania → Italian: Spagna 'Spain'
- Old English: cneo → English: knee → /ˈniː/

== Poetic device ==
- English: it is → 'tis
- English: upon → 'pon
- English: eleven →'leven

== Informal speech ==
Apheresis and clippings have generally been associated with informal speech (e.g. 'scuse me, how 'bout that?). The result of apheresis may be doublets, such as especially and specially, or the pre-apheresis form may fail to survive (e.g. Old French eschars to English scarce). An intermediate status is common in which both forms continue to exist but lose their transparent semantic relationship: abate 'decrease, moderate', with bate now confined to the locution with bated breath 'with breath held back'.

== See also ==
- Apocope
- Elision
- Initial dropping
- List of phonetics topics
- Syncope
