= Tiefenbach (Wisper) =

River in Germany

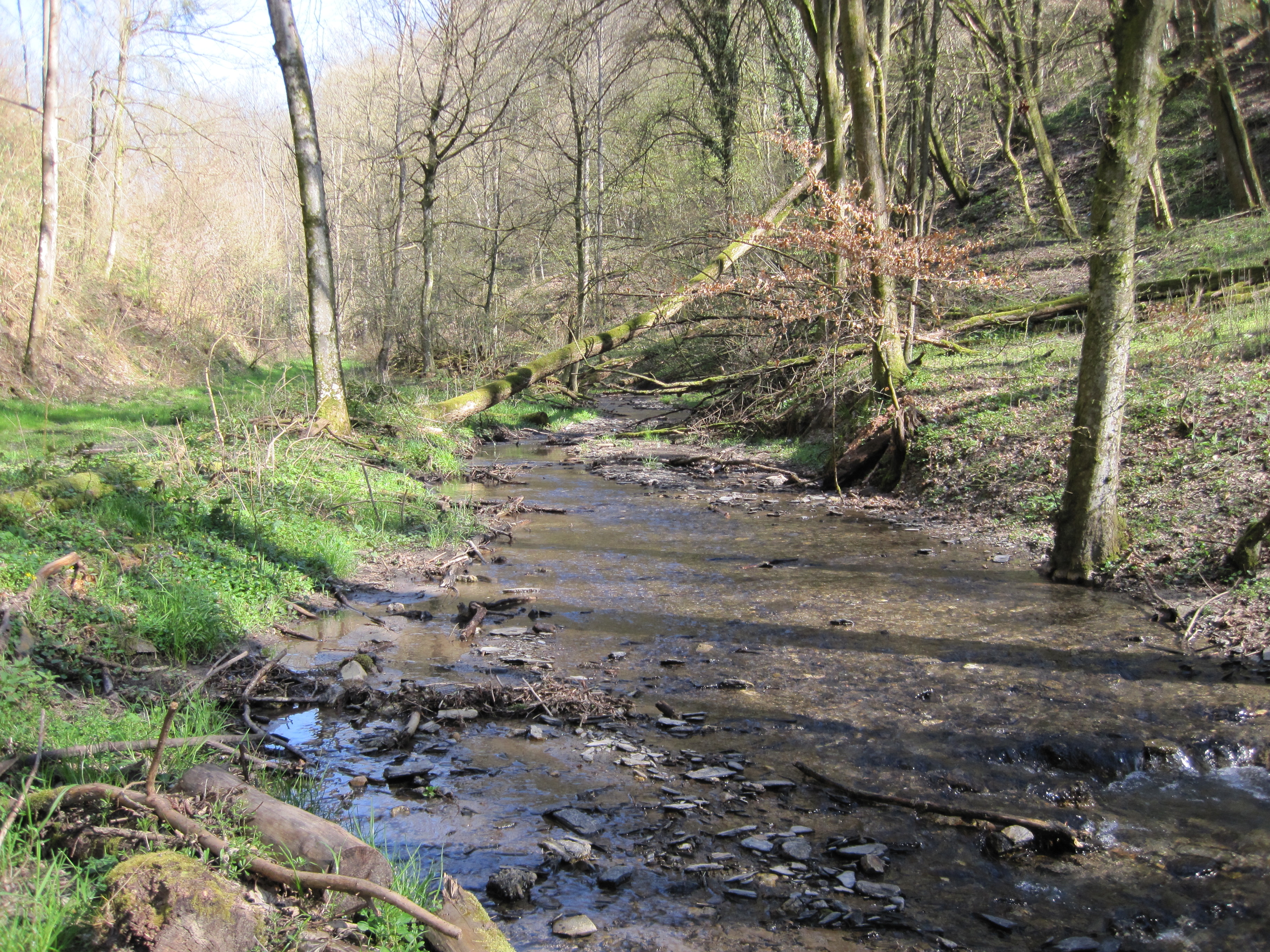
- The Tiefenbach between Sauerthal and Lorch am Rhein

Location
- Country: Germany
- States: Rhineland-Palatinate; Hesse

Physical characteristics
- Mouth
  - location: Wisper
  - coordinates: 50.0514°N 7.8208°E

Basin features
- Progression: Wisper→ Rhine→ North Sea

Tiefenbach is a river of Rhineland-Palatinate and Hesse, Germany. It flows into the Wisper near Lorch am Rhein.

== See also ==
- List of rivers of Hesse
- List of rivers of Rhineland-Palatinate
