= Lorck =

Lorck is a Norwegian and Danish surname. Notable people with the surname include:

- Anna Lorck, New Zealand politician
- Carl Lorck (1829–1882), Norwegian painter
- Melchior Lorck (c.1526–c.1583), Danish-German painter, draughtsman, and printmaker

== See also ==
- Lorch (disambiguation)
