= Lorch =

Lorch may refer to:

== People ==
- Edgar Lorch (1907–1990), Swiss American mathematician
- Grace Lorch (c. 1903–1974), American teacher and civil rights activist
- Karl Lorch (1950–2013), American football player
- Lee Lorch (1915–2014), American mathematician and civil rights activist
- Maristella Lorch, critic of Italian literature
- Rudi Lorch (born 1966), German footballer
- Rebecca Lorch (1990–2022), American competitive weightlifter and strongwoman
- Thembinkosi Lorch (born 1993), South African footballer
- Theodore Lorch (1873–1947), American film actor
- Wilhelm Lorch (1867–1954), German botanist

== Places ==
- Lorch, Hesse, a town in Hesse, Germany
- Lorch (Württemberg), a town in Baden-Württemberg, Germany
  - Lorch Abbey, a monastery at Lorch
- Lorch, Austria, part of Enns in Upper Austria
  - Lauriacum, the ancient Roman city that gives its name to Lorch
    - Archdiocese of Laureacum, the Christian diocese based at Lauriacum

== Other uses ==
- "Lorch" (song), by Kabza de Small and DJ Maphorisa, 2009

== See also ==
- Lerch, a surname
- Lorsch (disambiguation)
