= Sandhi =

Type of sound change at morpheme or syllable boundaries

Sandhi (/sænˈdiː/ san-DEE; Sanskrit: सन्धि, lit. 'joining', pronounced [sɐnˈdʱi]) is any of a wide variety of sound changes that occur at morpheme or word boundaries. Examples include fusion of sounds across word boundaries and the alteration of one sound depending on nearby sounds or the grammatical function of the adjacent words. Sandhi belongs to morphophonology.

Sandhi occurs in many languages, e.g. in the phonology of Indian languages (especially Sanskrit, Tamil, Sinhala, Telugu, Marathi, Hindi, Pali, Kannada, Odia, Bengali, Assamese and Malayalam). Many dialects of British English show linking and intrusive R.

Tone sandhi in particular defines tone changes affecting adjacent words and syllables. This is a common feature of many tonal languages such as Burmese and Chinese.

== Types ==
=== Internal and external sandhi ===
Sandhi can be either:

- internal, at morpheme boundaries within words, such as syn- + pathy: sympathy, or
- external, at word boundaries, such as the pronunciation "tem books" for ten books in some dialects of English. The linking /r/ process of some dialects of English ("I saw-r-a film" in British English) is a kind of external sandhi, as are French liaison (pronunciation of usually silent final consonants of words before words beginning with vowels) and Italian raddoppiamento fonosintattico (lengthening of initial consonants of words after certain words ending in vowels).

It may be extremely common in speech, but sandhi (especially external) is typically ignored in spelling, as is the case in English (exceptions: the distinction between a and an; the prefixes con-, en-, in- and syn-, whose n assimilates to m before p, m or b). Sandhi is, however, reflected in the orthography of Sanskrit, Sinhala, Telugu, Marathi, Pali and some other Indian languages, as with Italian in the case of compound words with lexicalised syntactic gemination.

External sandhi effects can sometimes become morphologised (apply only in certain morphological and syntactic environments) as in Tamil and, over time, turn into consonant mutations.

=== Tone sandhi ===
Most tonal languages have tone sandhi in which the tones of words alter according to certain rules. An example is the behavior of Mandarin Chinese; in isolation, tone 3 is often pronounced as a falling-rising tone. When a tone 3 occurs before another tone 3, however, it changes into tone 2 (a rising tone), and when it occurs before any of the other tones, it is pronounced as a low falling tone with no rise at the end.

An example occurs in the common greeting 你好 nǐ hǎo (with two words containing underlying tone 3), which is in practice pronounced ní hǎo. The first word is pronounced with tone 2, but the second is unaffected.

== Examples ==
=== Celtic languages ===
In Celtic languages, the consonant mutation sees the initial consonant of a word change according to its morphological or syntactic environment. Following are some examples from Breton, Irish, Scottish Gaelic, and Welsh:

| Breton | Welsh | Irish | Scottish Gaelic | Gloss |
|---|---|---|---|---|
| gwreg | gwraig | bean | bean* | woman/wife |
| bras | mawr | mór | mòr | big |
| ar wreg vras | y wraig fawr | an bhean mhór | a' bhean mhòr | the big woman |
| kazh | cath | cat | cat | cat |
| e gazh | ei gath | a chat | a chat | his cat |
| he c'hazh | ei chath | a cat | a cat | her cat |
| o c'hazh | eu cath | a gcat | an cat | their cat |

=== Portuguese ===
When two words belonging to the same phrase are pronounced together, or two morphemes are joined in a word, the last sound in the first may be affected by the first sound of the next (sandhi), either coalescing with it, or becoming shorter (a semivowel), or being deleted. This affects especially the sibilant consonants /s/, /z/, /ʃ/, /ʒ/, and the unstressed final vowels /ɐ/, /i, ɨ/, /u/.

==== Consonant sandhi ====
The dialects of Portuguese can be divided into two groups, according to whether syllable-final sibilants are pronounced as postalveolar consonants /ʃ/, /ʒ/ or as alveolar /s/, /z/. At the end of words, the default pronunciation for a sibilant is voiceless, /ʃ, s/, but in connected speech the sibilant is treated as though it were within a word (assimilation):

- If the next word begins with a voiceless consonant, the final sibilant remains voiceless /s, ʃ/; bons tempos [bõʃ ˈtẽpuʃ] or [bõs ˈtẽpus] ('good times').
- If the next word begins with a voiced consonant, the final sibilant becomes voiced as well /z, ʒ/; bons dias [bõʒ ˈdiɐʃ] or [bõz ˈdʒiɐs] ('good days').
- If the next word begins with a vowel, the final sibilant is treated as intervocalic, and pronounced [z]; bons amigos [bõz ɐˈmiɣuʃ] or [bõz aˈmiɡus] ('good friends').

When two identical sibilants appear in sequence within a word, they reduce to a single consonant. For example, nascer, desço, excesso, exsudar are pronounced with [s] by speakers who use alveolar sibilants at the end of syllables, and disjuntor is pronounced with [ʒ] by speakers who use postalveolars. But if the two sibilants are different they may be pronounced separately, depending on the dialect. Thus, the former speakers will pronounce the last example with [zʒ], whereas the latter speakers will pronounce the first examples with [s] if they are from Brazil or [ʃs] if from Portugal (although in relaxed pronunciation, one of the siblants may be dropped). This applies also to words that are pronounced together in connected speech:

- sibilant + /s/, e.g., as sopas: either [s] (most of Brazil); [ʃs] (Portugal, standard)
- sibilant + /z/, e.g., as zonas: either [z] (mostly in Brazil); [ʒz] (Portugal, standard)
- sibilant + /ʃ/, e.g., as chaves: always [ʃ];
- sibilant + /ʒ/, e.g., os genes: always [ʒ].

==== Vowel sandhi ====
Normally, only the three vowels /ɐ/, /i/ (in BP) or /ɨ/ (in EP), and /u/ occur in unstressed final position. If the next word begins with a similar vowel, they merge with it in connected speech, producing a single vowel, possibly long (crasis). Here, "similar" means that nasalization can be disregarded, and that the two central vowels /a, ɐ/ can be identified with each other. Thus,

- /aa, aɐ, ɐa, ɐɐ/ → [a(ː)] (henceforth transcribed [a (a)]); toda a noite [ˈtoða (a)ˈnojtɨ] or [ˈtoda (a) ˈnojtʃi] ('all night'), nessa altura [ˈnɛs awˈtuɾɐ] or [ˈnɛs alˈtuɾɐ] ('at that point').
- /aɐ̃, ɐɐ̃/ → [ã(ː)]) (henceforth transcribed [ã (ã)]); a antiga ('the ancient one') and à antiga ('in the ancient way'), both pronounced [ã (ã)ˈtʃiɡɐ] or [ã (ã)ˈtiɣɐ]. The open nasalized [ã] appears only in this environment.
- /ii, iĩ/ → [i(ː), ĩ(ː)] (henceforth transcribed [i (i), ĩ (ĩ)]); de idade [dʒi (i)ˈdadʒi] or [di (i)ˈðaðɨ] ('aged').
- /ɨɨ/ → [ɨ]; fila de espera [ˈfilɐ ðɨʃˈpɛɾɐ] ('waiting line') (EP only).
- /uu, uũ/ → [u(ː), ũ(ː)] (henceforth transcribed [u (u), ũ (ũ)]); todo o dia [ˈtodu (u)ˈdʒiɐ] or [ˈtoðu (u) ˈðiɐ] ('all day').

If the next word begins with a dissimilar vowel, then /i/ and /u/ become approximants in Brazilian Portuguese (synaeresis):

- /i/ + V → [jV]; durante o curso [duˈɾɐ̃tʃju ˈkuɾsu] ('during the course'), mais que um [majs kjũ] ('more than one').
- /u/ + V → [wV]; todo este tempo [ˈtoˈdwestʃi ˈtẽpu] ('all this time') do objeto [dwobiˈʒɛtu] ('of the object').

In careful speech and in with certain function words, or in some phrase stress conditions (see Mateus and d'Andrade, for details), European Portuguese has a similar process:

- /ɨ/ + V → [jV]; se a vires [sjɐ ˈviɾɨʃ] ('if you see her'), mais que um [majʃ kjũ] ('more than one').
- /u/ + V → [wV]; todo este tempo [ˈtoˈðweʃtɨ ˈtẽpu] ('all this time'), do objeto [dwɔbˈʒɛtu] ('of the object').

But in other prosodic conditions, and in relaxed pronunciation, EP simply drops final unstressed /ɨ/ and /u/ (elision), though this is subject to significant dialectal variation:

- durante o curso [duˈɾɐ̃tu ˈkuɾsu] ('during the course'), este inquilino [ˈeʃtĩkɨˈlinu] ('this tenant').
- todo este tempo [toˈðeʃtɨ ˈtẽpu] ('all this time'), disto há muito [diʃta ˈmũjtu] ('there's a lot of this').

Aside from historical set contractions formed by prepositions plus determiners or pronouns, like à/dà, ao/do, nesse, dele, etc., on one hand and combined clitic pronouns such as mo/ma/mos/mas (it/him/her/them to/for me), and so on, on the other, Portuguese spelling does not reflect vowel sandhi. In poetry, however, an apostrophe may be used to show elision such as in d'água.

=== German dialects ===
In various German dialects or the spoken Standard German, one can find phonological processes that can be analysed as sandhi. For example some varieties of Central Hessian show a vowel length alternation where, if the same long vowel were else to repeat in two consecutive syllables, the vowel is shortened/reduced in the first, but maintained in the second. Examples are [hɪɡiː] for HG hingehen ("go towards") (hin corresponds to [hiː] in Hessian) or [kən aːnʒ̊ə] for HG kein einziger ("no single [thing]").

=== English ===
Linking is a type of external sandhi in connected speech, occurring at junctures, most often open junctures (word boundaries). In English phonology, two types of linking are common: consonant–vowel (CV) and vowel–vowel (VV). Some varieties of English also exhibit rarer vowel–consonant (VC) linking.

In consonant–vowel linking (also called catenation, and equivalent to enchaînement in § French), word-final consonants that are followed by words starting with a vowel are often articulated as though they are part of the following word, often described as a type of resyllabification. For example, pack up /pæk‿ʌp/ may be pronounced as [pʰæ.kʌp]. Diachronically, cases of linking may help facilitate rebracketing (also called juncture loss), particularly when word boundaries are ambiguous (see English articles § Juncture loss). For example, a newt and an apron were once an ewt and a napron, respectively.

In vowel–vowel linking (also called liaison, though distinct from the process in § French with the same name), words that end with a vowel followed by words starting with a vowel may be "broken up" (avoiding vowel hiatus) by inserting one of the approximants [ɹ, l, j, w], a type of epenthesis, where they are referred to as intrusive consonants (thus the process is also sometimes referred to as intrusion). In non-rhotic dialects, the particularly distinctive insertion of [ɹ] is called linking and intrusive R. For example, in Standard Southern British English, law and order might be pronounced as [ˈlɔːɹəˌnɔːdə] (as if "Laura Norder"), and America and China might be pronounced as [əˌmɛɹəkəɹənˈtʃɑjnə]. In both rhotic and non-rhotic dialects, the semivowels [j] and [w] may perform a similar role for words ending in diphthongs, though such cases are typically less distinctive than for [ɹ]. For example, my app /maɪ‿æp/ might be pronounced as [maɪ.jæp], and go out /ɡoʊ‿aʊt/ might be pronounced as [ɡoʊ.waʊt]. Similar to the movement that occurs in consonant–vowel linking, the diphthong offglide may also split from the onset vowel in a manner of resyllabification, producing [ma.jæp] and [ɡo.waʊt].

Some varieties of American English and West Country English have been shown to exhibit an intrusive L, an opposite process of L-vocalization. Although it sometimes patterns as vowel–vowel linking, it may also occur independently at the end of words, particularly in the backing diphthongs /aʊ, oʊ/, whereby the offglide component is realized as a dark L [æɫ, oɫ], as well as after the open(-mid) back vowels /ɑː, ɒ, ɔː/. Thus, drawing and how may surface as drawling [dɹɑːɫɪŋ] and Hal [hæɫ], respectively. Furthermore, in some varieties of English and in a select set of cases, intrusive R and L may arise in vowel–consonant linking. Commonly cited examples include the pronunciation of Washington as Warshington [wɑɹʃɪŋtən] (particularly distinctive of the Baltimore accent), and the pronunciation of both as bolth [boɫθ] (the latter related to the aforementioned intrusive L in backing diphthongs).

=== French ===
French liaison and enchaînement can be considered forms of external sandhi.

In enchaînement, a word-final consonant, when followed by a word that starts with a vowel, is articulated as though it is part of the following word. For example, sens ('direction') is pronounced /sɑ̃s/ and unique ('unique') is pronounced /ynik/; sens unique ('one-way', as a street) is pronounced /sɑ̃‿synik/.

Liaison is a similar phenomenon, applicable to words ending in a consonant that was historically pronounced but that, in Modern French, is normally silent when occurring at the end of a phrase or before another consonant. In some circumstances, when the following word starts with a vowel, the consonant may be pronounced, and in that case is articulated as if part of the next word. For example, deux frères ('two brothers') is pronounced /dø fʁɛʁ/ with a silent ⟨x⟩, and quatre hommes ('four men') is pronounced /kat‿ʁɔm/, but deux hommes ('two men') is pronounced /dø‿zɔm/.

=== Basque ===
In Basque, cases of sandhi (lotura [linking]) are always pronounced, but never denoted in writing, when a verb beginning by z- (/s/), d- (/d/) or g- (/g/) goes after the negative adverb ez, meaning "no", "not". They are also frequent, but do not necessarily occur in all the dialects, when a verb beginning by l- (/l/) or n- (/n/) follows.

For example:

- Eman du "(He / She / It) has given it" /e'man 'du/ > Ez du eman (He / She / It) has not given it /'es'tu e'man/
- Eman zuen "(He / She / It) Gave it" /e'man tsu'en/ > Ez zuen eman (He / She / It) Did not give it /'etsu'en e'man/
- Etxean ginen "(We) were at home" /e't͡ʃe'an gi'nen/ or /e't͡ʃe'an gi'ɳen/ > Ez ginen etxean (We) were not at home /'es ki'nen e't͡ʃe'an/ or /'es ki'ɳen e't͡ʃe'an/

The same kinds of sandhi are also common when a verb beginning with z- follows a word ending in -l, -n or -r:

- Hemen zen "(He / She / It) was here" > /he'men'tsen/ or /e'men'tsen/
- Hor zen "(He / She / It) was there" > /'hor'tsen/ or /'or'tsen/
- Gal zedin "(So that he / she / it) got lost" > /'gal tse'δin/

An exception in the spelling happens with the intensive suffix -xe (/ʃe/), which changes to the affricate sound -txe (/t͡ʃe/) after -n or -r. Compare:

- hemen > hementxe ("here" > "right here", "exactly here")
- hor > hortxe ("there" > "right there", "exactly there")
- orain > oraintxe ("now" > "right now", "in this very moment")

But:

- hau > hauxe ("this ..." / "this one" > "exactly this ..." / "exactly this one")
- gora > gorago > goraxeago ("up, high" / "higher" / "a little bit higher")

=== Japanese ===
In Japanese phonology, sandhi is primarily exhibited in rendaku (consonant mutation from unvoiced to voiced when not word-initial, in some contexts) and conversion of つ or く (tsu, ku) to a geminate consonant (orthographically, the sokuon っ), both of which are reflected in spelling – indeed, the っ symbol for gemination is morphosyntactically derived from つ, and voicing is indicated by adding two dots as in か／が ka, ga, making the relation clear. It also occurs much less often in renjō (連声), where, most commonly, a terminal /n/ on one morpheme results in an /n/ (or /m/) being added to the start of the next morpheme, as in 天皇: てん ＋ おう → てんのう (ten + ō = tennō), meaning "emperor"; that is also shown in the spelling (the kanji do not change, but the kana, which specify pronunciation, change).

=== Korean ===
Korean has sandhi affecting morpheme-final consonants and consonant clusters, such that a morpheme can have two pronunciations depending on whether or not it is followed by a vowel. In particular, syllables written with two final consonants follow certain patterns of reduction to a single consonant, but these reductions are reversed when a vowel follows. For example, the root 읽 /ik/, meaning "to read read," is pronounced /ik/ before a consonant, as in 읽다 /ik.ta/, the infinitive, but is pronounced like /il.g/ before vowels, as in 읽으세요 /il.gɯ.se̞.jo/, the polite honorific form. Furthermore, morphemes ending with the letter ㅎ (phonemically /h/) trigger aspiration of following consonants. For example, the infinitive suffix -다 is usually pronounced /ta/, but the infinitive of 좋- "to be good" is pronounced [t͡ɕotʰa].

=== Tamil ===
Tamil 'punarchi' (புனர்ச்சி) or sandhi has been rigorously and exhaustively documented in Tamil grammar texts since the early centuries AD. As modern Tamil is strongly characterised by diglossia: there are two separate registers varying by speech context, a high register and a low one. This in turn presents two corresponding domains for forming Sandhi. Tamil employs Sandhi for certain morphological and syntactic structures.

==== Vowel position ====
The vowel sandhi occurs when words or morphemes ending in certain vowels are followed by morphemes beginning with certain vowels. Consonant glides (Tamil: ய், romanized: Y and Tamil: வ், romanized: V) are then inserted between the vowels in order to 'smooth the transition' from one vowel to another.

"The choice of whether the glide inserted will be (ய், Y and வ், V) in Tamil is determined by whether the vowel preceding the glide is a front vowel such as Tamil: இ, ஈ, எ, ஏ or ஐ, romanized: i, ī, e, ē or ai or a back vowel, such as Tamil: உ, ஊ, ஒ, ஓ, அ or ஆ, romanized: u, ū, o, ō, a or ā."

===== Examples in Spoken Tamil =====
====== Sandhi following front vowels ======
| Vowel Ending | Noun | Grammatical Suffix | Result |
|---|---|---|---|
| இ | Tamil: நரி, romanized: Nari, lit. 'Fox' | Interrogative, Tamil: ஆ, romanized: Ā | Tamil: நரியா, romanized: Nariyā, lit. 'A fox?' |
| ஈ | Tamil: தீ, romanized: Tī, lit. 'Fire' | Interrogative, Tamil: ஆ, romanized: Ā | Tamil: தீயா, romanized: Tīyā, lit. 'Fire?' |
| எ | No literary Tamil word ends in எ. In spoken Tamil, ஐ is shortened to எ due to colloquialism | ——— | ——— |
| ஏ | No literary or spoken Tamil word ends in ஏ | ——— | ——— |
| ஐ | Tamil: யானை, romanized: Yāṉai, lit. 'Elephant' | Interrogative, Tamil: ஆ, romanized: Ā | Tamil: யானையா, romanized: Yāṉaiyā, lit. 'An elephant?' |

====== Sandhi following back vowels ======
| Vowel Ending | Noun | Grammatical Suffix | Result |
|---|---|---|---|
| உ | Tamil: குரு, romanized: Kuru, lit. 'Guru, teacher' | Interrogative, Tamil: ஆ, romanized: Ā | Usually deleted, or added later after sandhi rules have applied. A few exceptions: Tamil: குருவா, romanized: Kuruvā, lit. 'A guru?' |
| ஊ | Tamil: பூ, romanized: Pū, lit. 'Flower' | Interrogative, Tamil: ஆ, romanized: Ā | Tamil: பூவா, romanized: Pūvā, lit. 'A flower?' |
| ஒ | Doesn't occur in Spoken Tamil, but might occur in loan word | ——— | ——— |
| ஓ | Tamil: இளங்கோ, romanized: Iḷaṅkō, lit. 'Ilango (a name)' | Interrogative, Tamil: ஆ, romanized: Ā | Tamil: இளங்கோவா, romanized: Iḷaṅkōvā, lit. '(Do you mean) Ilango?' |
| அ | Tamil: இருக்க, romanized: Irukka, lit. 'To be, to sit (Sri Lankan Tamil dialects resp. Old/Middle Tamil)' | Affirmative, Tamil: ஏ, romanized: Ē | Tamil: இருக்கவே, romanized: Irukkavē, lit. 'It's there, all right!' |
| ஆ | Tamil: விழா, romanized: Viḻā, lit. 'A festival' | Interrogative, Tamil: ஆ, romanized: Ā | Tamil: விழாவா, romanized: Viḻāvā, lit. 'A festival?' |
| ஔ | Doesn't occur in Spoken Tamil | ——— | ——— |

In rapid speech, especially in polysyllabic words: Tamil: இந்த்யாவுலேருந்து, romanized: Intyāvulēruntu, lit. 'From India' may become — இந்த்யாலெருந்து, Intyāleruntu, which may then be further simplified to இந்த்யாலெந்து, Intyālentu.

==== Consonant sandhi ====
In lateral-stop clusters, the lateral assimilates to the stop's manner of articulation, before c, ṇ too becomes ṭ, eg. nal-mai, kal-kaḷ, vaṟaḷ-ci, kāṇ-ci, eḷ-ney > naṉmai, kaṟkaḷ, vaṟaṭci, kāṭci, eṇṇey (ṟ was historically a plosive).

==== Elision ====
In Spoken Tamil the final laterals, nasals or other sonorants may lose the final position. The final retroflex laterals for pronouns and their PNG markers for example Tamil: ள், romanized: ḷ of (female gender marker) are deleted: (To indicate the omitted stop-consonant is covered in parantheses): Tamil: அவ(ள்) போறா(ள்), romanized: Ava(ḷ) pōṟā(ḷ), lit. 'She goes'.

==== Noun cases ====
In some nouns, sandhi is triggered by the addition of a case ending to the stem.

=== Sanskrit ===
Sanskrit has formalized and systematized sandhi changes; like in all Indian languages, the sandhi changes are also recorded in the written language. There are two categories of sandhi in Sanskrit: internal and external sandhi. Internal sandhi takes place within words, at the junctures of morphemes. External sandhi occurs at word boundaries and between members of compounds.

The basic rule is to make it easier to pronounce words and sentences. Therefore, clashing consecutive sounds are avoided as much as possible. In the case of internal and external vowel sandhi, this means, generally speaking, that two vowels should not come into direct contact. This is avoided by the combination of the two consecutive vowels into a single sound. That can happen in three different ways: by coalescence of the two vowels, by changing the first vowel to a consonant, or by dropping one of the vowels. Similarly to vowels, clashing consonants are avoided by assimilation of either one or both of the juxtaposed sounds.

The number of sandhi changes in Sanskrit is extensive, these are described in various books on Sanskrit grammar and most notably, in the Aṣṭādhyāyī grammar by Pāṇini. A couple of examples are given in the following sections to illustrate the kind of changes which occur.

==== Examples of external vowel sandhi ====
In compounding, if the first word ends with /i, u/ and the second word starts with a vowel, the i, u become glides y, v, e.g. su-āgata > svāgata. If a word ends with /a, aː/ and the second word begins with /i, u/ they become /eː, oː/, eg. mahā-utsava > mahotsava; if the latter vowel is /eː, oː/, it becomes /ai, au/, eg. tathā-ēva > tathaiva.

==== Examples of external consonant sandhi ====
The visarga ('ः' [h]) becomes a /r/ before voiced phones, eg. duḥ-labha > durlabha. Anusvara + plosive makes it a homorganic nasal, before a fricative or /r/ it nasalizes the previous vowel and before /j, ʋ/ it nasalizes the /j, ʋ/.

In some compounds [s] follows the RUKI rule, eg. vi-sama > viṣama, pitr-svaseya > pitrṣvaseya.

== See also ==
- Alternation (linguistics)
- Crasis
- Elision
- Liaison (French)
- Linking and intrusive R
- Movable nu
