= Lerch =

Lerch is a German and Czech surname meaning "lark" in German. Czech feminine form: Lerchová. Notable people with the surname include:

- Augie Lerch (born 1996), American racing driver
- Charles W. Lerch, founder of Lerch Bates consulting company
- Christian Lerch (born 1978), German journalist
- Dagmar Lerchová, Czech figure skater
- Ernst Lerch (1914–1997), German SS officer
- Fred Louis Lerch (1902–1985), Austrian actor
- Fredi Lerch (born 1954), Swiss journalist
- Georg August Lerch (1792–1857), German architect and politician
- Gustov C. Lerch, owner of the historical Gustov C. Lerch House
- Jiří Lerch (born 1971), Czech footballer
- Laura Lerchová, Czech ice hockey player
- Marilyn Lerch (born 1936), American-Canadian poet and activist
- Mathias Lerch (1860–1922), Czech mathematician
- Randy Lerch (born 1954), American baseball player
- Reinhard Lerch, German engineer
- Stephan Lerch (born 1984), German football coach

== See also ==
- Lerch transcendent
- Lorch (disambiguation)
