= Free State of Bottleneck =

1919–1923 quasi-state in western Germany

Coordinates: 50°09′43″N 7°55′16″E

Free State of Bottleneck Freistaat Flaschenhals (German)
- 1919–1920
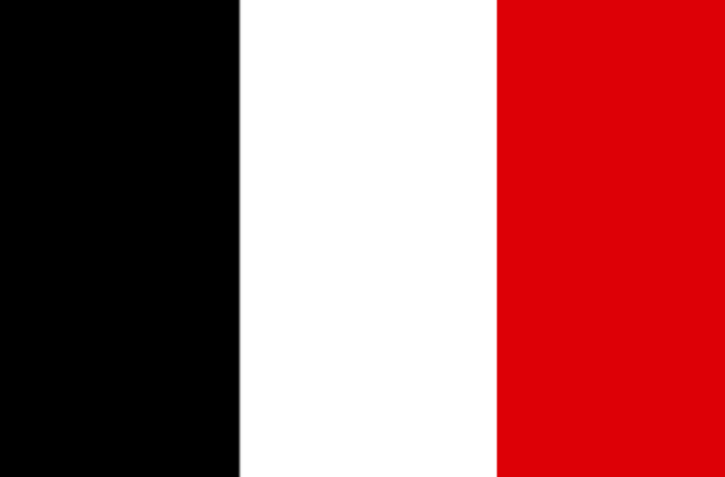
- Flag

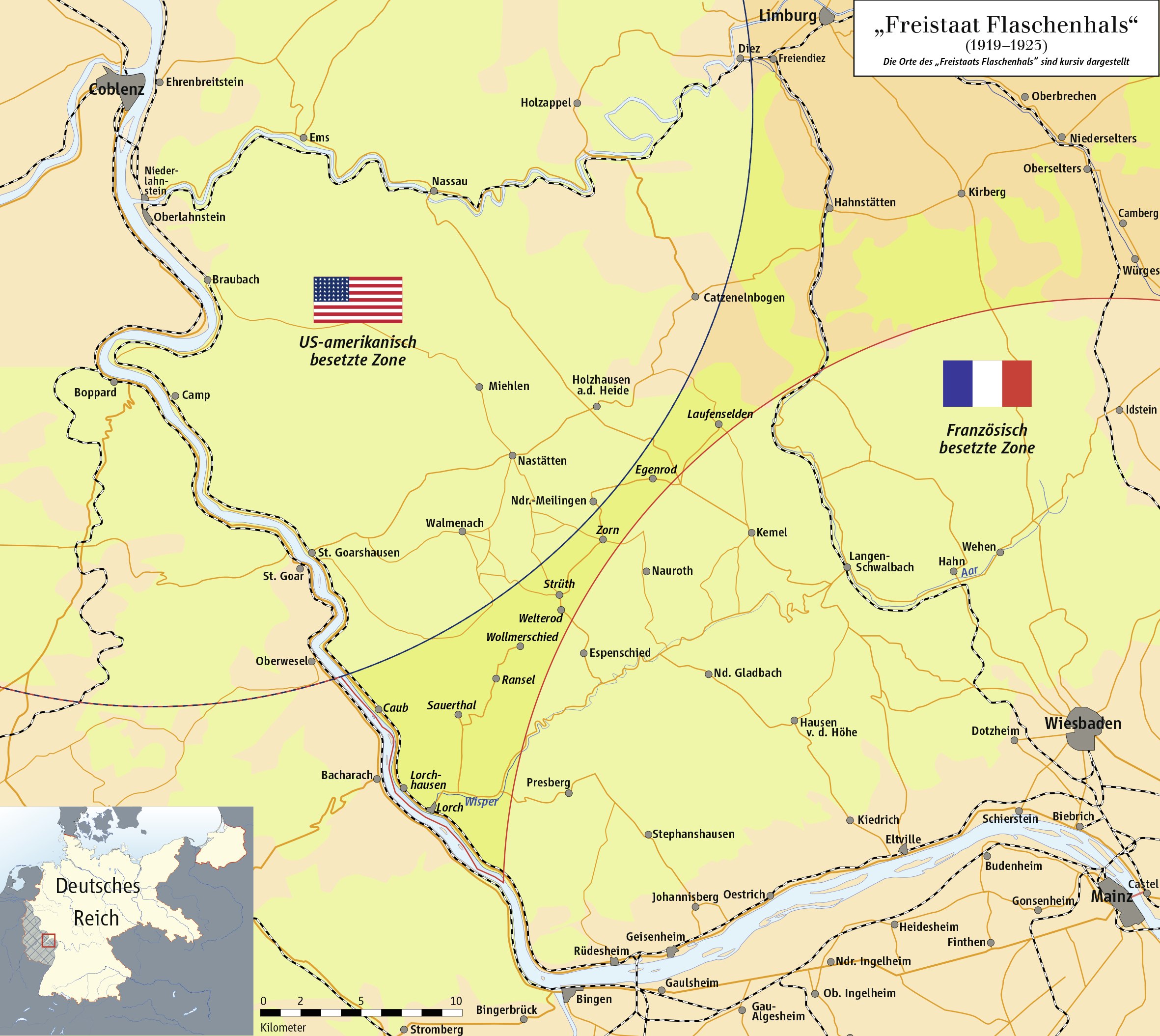
- Map of the Free State of Bottleneck
- Status: Unoccupied territory within Post-World War I Germany
- Capital: Lorch
- Common languages: German; Central Hessian
- Religion: Protestantism
- Demonym: German
- Government: Republic
- President
  - 1919–1920: Edmund Pnischeck
- Historical era: Interwar period
  - Established: 10 January 1919
  - Dissolved: 1 July 1920

Population
  - 1920: 17,363
- Currency: Freistaattaler; German mark; French franc
Preceded by	Succeeded by
German Empire	Occupied Ruhr
- Today part of: Germany
- ^a Today used for tourist purposes.

The Free State of Bottleneck (German: Freistaat Flaschenhals) was a short-lived quasi-state that existed from 10 January 1919 until 1 July 1920. It was formed from part of the Prussian province of Hesse-Nassau as a consequence of the occupation of the Rhineland following World War I. The Bottleneck is now part of the German states of Hesse and Rhineland-Palatinate.

== History ==
=== Creation ===
Following the Armistice of 1918, Allied forces occupied the German territory west of the Rhine. To maintain a military presence on the eastern side, the Allied powers extended their zones of occupation by creating three semi-circular bridgeheads of 30 km (19 mi) radius, radiating from Cologne (British zone), Koblenz (American zone), and Mainz (French zone).

The French and American zones did not meet entirely, leaving a narrow gap on the eastern side of the Rhine containing the Wisper valley, the towns of Lorch and Kaub, and villages of Lorchhausen, Sauerthal, Ransel, Wollmerschied, Welterod, Zorn, Strüth and Egenrod.

Surrounded by the two Allied bridgeheads, the Rhine to the south-west and no roads nor any railways towards the north-east, this small region was effectively cut off from the rest of Germany and subsequently separated from the administration of the Weimar Republic.

Owing to the circular nature of the Allied bridgeheads, this enclosed territory took on the shape of a bottleneck, hence the name that was given to the microstate, when it was declared on 10 January 1919.

=== Self-governance ===
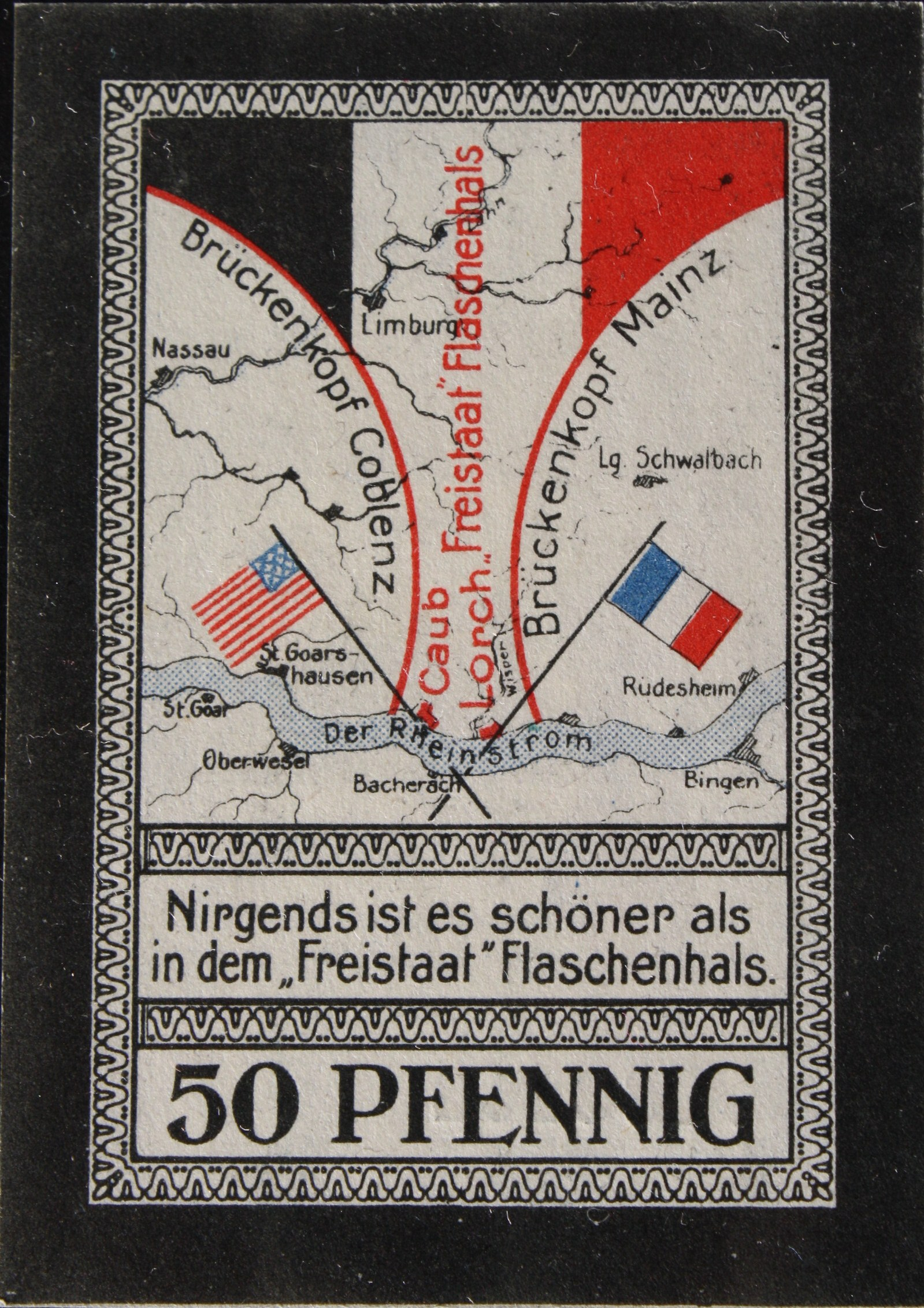
Emergency money with a verse reading "Nowhere is finer than the 'Free State' Bottleneck".

The region contained approximately 17,000 people and its largest town, Lorch, was established as the capital. The Mayor of Lorch, Edmund Pnischeck, was subsequently elected president of the small territory. Pnischeck headed the Bottleneck's administration for all of its existence, which even oversaw the production of its own stamps. Also, due to the isolated economy, Pnischeck issued emergency currency, which soon gained considerable value in neighboring occupied territories.

There were no roads connecting the Bottleneck to unoccupied Germany, trains were not permitted to stop there, and air or river transportation was impossible. The movement of goods and post to and from the state was only made possible by smuggling. Pnischeck's first action was to have a temporary road built between the Rhine and Heidenrod. He also had a telegraph line constructed that bypassed Allied occupied territory, with help from the Limburg an der Lahn telegraph office.

Once, a French train loaded with coal from the Ruhr valley was hijacked from neighbouring Rüdesheim am Rhein and taken to the Bottleneck, where the coal was distributed among the populace for heating purposes. Also, nighttime ship transports were a proven means of supplying the bottleneck with essential goods, requiring 20 to 25 horse-drawn carts to unload. Limburg district administrator and local merchant, Robert Büchting, also supplied the Bottleneck, and was helped by a "Minister of Railways" based in Lorch, who had access to a large fleet of vehicles belonging to the "Association for the Chemical Industry in Frankfurt." According to Pnischeck, such actions were so successful that the Bottleneck may have been one of the first regions in Germany to abolish food rationing.

The French attempted to break apart the Bottleneck, with General Henri Mordacq claiming the Bottleneck as a French occupation zone, but this met with resistance from the other Allied forces. The French then cut telephone and telegraph connections between the Bottleneck and Wiesbaden, and mail service was blocked.

==== Foreign relations ====
The state issued passports to its citizens, and had plans to establish an embassy in Berlin. Furthermore, it was intended to establish diplomatic relations with other countries, but the state was dissolved before these plans were realized.

=== Dissolution ===
The Bottleneck was effectively dissolved after the suppression of the Ruhr uprising in 1920 by the Reichswehr, with the self-administration ending on 1 July 1920. According to Pnischeck, the abolishment date of 1923 following the French occupation of the Ruhr was "nonsense". The Bottleneck was eventually reincorporated with the Prussian province of Hesse-Nassau.

== Legacy ==
The former territory of the Bottleneck is now part of the Rhine Gorge UNESCO World Heritage Site. The history of the Bottleneck is now a tourist attraction in the area, particularly in the former Free State's major towns of Kaub and Lorch.

The Bottleneck stamps and currency are now sought-after rarities. Wine that was smuggled in from occupied Germany and stored in Lorch and Kaub can also fetch high prices.

== See also ==
- Free Republic of Schwarzenberg
