= Verch =

Verch is a surname. Notable people with the surname include:

- April Verch, Canadian fiddler, singer, and step dancer
- Ronald Verch (born 1986), German sprint canoer

== See also ==
- Lerch
