= 505 (Nashville) =

Residential skyscraper in Tennessee, US

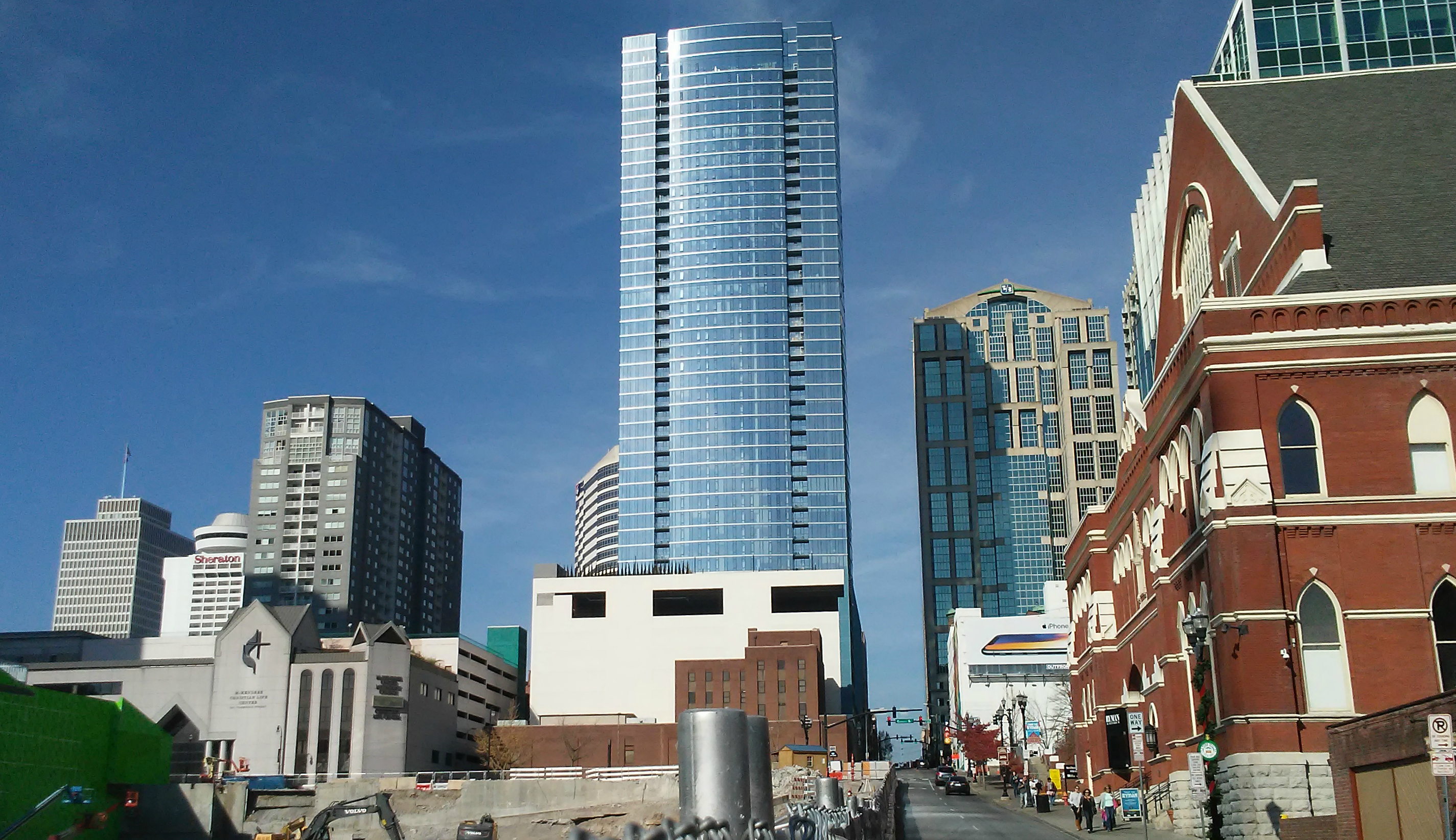
- 505 (Nashville) viewed from Broadway and 5th Ave on December 3, 2017. The Ryman Auditorium is on the right in the foreground.
- Interactive map of the 505 area
- Former names: 505 CST; Paramount

General information
- Status: Completed
- Type: Residential apartments
- Location: 505 Church Street; Nashville, Tennessee; United States
- Coordinates: 36°9′45.9″N 86°46′48.9″W
- Construction started: December 2015
- Topped-out: May 18, 2017
- Completed: January 2018
- Opened: January 2018

Height
- Height: 543 ft (166 m)

Technical details
- Floor count: 45
- Floor area: 403,000 sq ft (37,400 m^{2})

Design and construction
- Architecture firm: Solomon Cordwell Buenz
- Developer: Giarratana Development, LLC
- Main contractor: Archer Western Construction

Website
- 505nashville.com

505, previously known as 505 CST and Paramount, is a residential skyscraper in downtown Nashville, Tennessee, located at the intersection of Fifth Avenue and Church Street. 505 stands on the location originally intended for the cancelled Signature Tower. The 45-story building is 543 feet (166 m) tall and feature 403,000 sq ft (37,400 m^{2}) of floor space. 505 is the tallest building in Nashville based on occupied floors, and the third tallest overall behind the AT&T Building and the Four Seasons Hotel and Residences. It includes 350 apartment units and 178 condo units ranging from 485 sq ft (45.1 m^{2}) to more than 4,374 sq ft (406.4 m^{2}), Other areas include three retail spaces including an 8,000 sq ft (740 m^{2}) ground-level restaurant, a 45,000 sq ft (4,200 m^{2}) amenity level, and 690 parking spaces. It was estimated to cost US$169 million. The architect is Solomon Cordwell Buenz.

Preleasing opened in November 2016, with rents ranging from $1,500 to $6,300 per month (excluding penthouses). The building topped out on May 18, 2017, and opened to its first tenants on October 1, 2017 in advance of completion in January 2018. Initially, no sales are planned for 505. The investment and financing arrangements, including an investment from a real estate investment trust, do not allow for sales during construction.

505 was named Best New Skyscraper in the 2017 Nashville Scene "Best of Nashville" awards.

== See also ==
- List of tallest buildings in Nashville
- List of tallest buildings in Tennessee
- Paramount Tower
