= St. Bonifatius, Lorchhausen =

St. Bonifatius
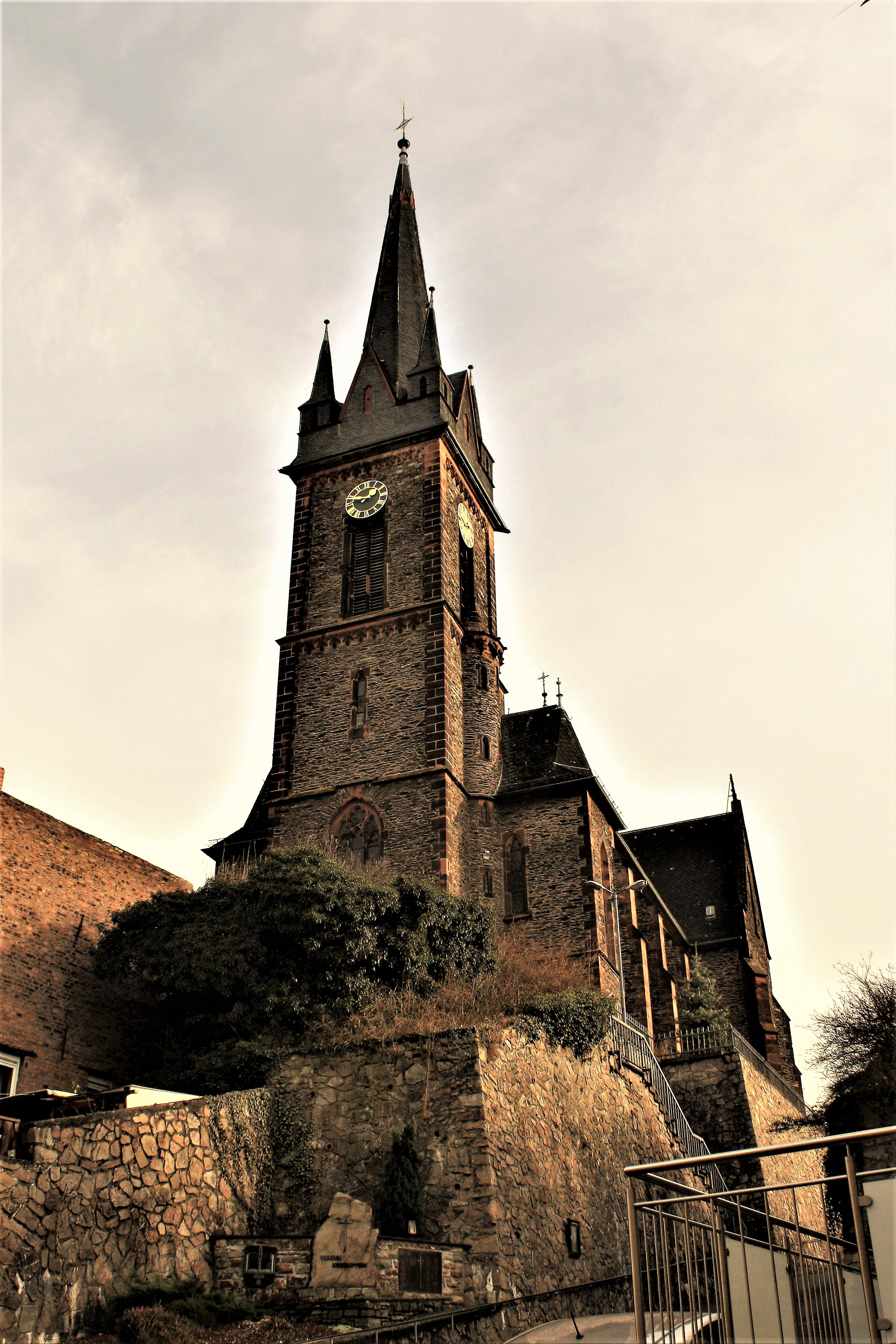
- St. Bonifatius
- 50.052844°N 7.784785°E
- Location: Lorchhausen, part of Lorch, Hesse, Germany
- Denomination: Catholic
- Website: heilig-kreuz-rheingau.de

History
- Dedication: Saint Boniface

Architecture
- Functional status: Active
- Architect: Kontsen
- Years built: 1877–1879

Administration
- Diocese: Limburg

St. Bonifatius is a Catholic church in Lorchhausen, part of Lorch, Hesse, Germany. The large church in Gothic revival style was completed in 1879.

== History ==
The former church in Lorchhausen, from the 14th century and dedicated to Saint Boniface, was too small and also damaged by several fires, one in 1801, and again in 1872. The parish priest from 1869, Wilhelm Aloys Ohlenschläger, initiated the building of a larger church. The Franco-Prussian War of 1870/71 delayed the project. Due to the narrow situation in the village, the old church could not be replaced. The Pforten vineyard was chosen as the new site. Building began on 21 May 1872 with flattening the site, done by the villagers. In September 1875, the Diocese of Limburg approved the design of a church in Gothic revival style by architect Kontzen from Oestrich. The building was supervised by the Franciscan Paschalis Gratze, who changed the plans, enlarging the interior. The corner stone was set on 19 March 1877. In May 1877, Max Meckel took over, changing the plans again regarding doors, windows, vault, dome and floor. The church was consecrated on 5 June 1879 by Ohlenschläger.

The parish became part of Heilig-Kreuz in Geisenheim, and belongs to the Diocese of Limburg.

== Architecture ==
The church is built following medieval models, in Gothic revival style. It has one high tower in the west, and three naves. Most of the furnishings date from 1884, including a high altar with scenes from the life of Saint Boniface by Theodor Stracke. New bells were needed, as the former ones melted in the fire. The Bach company created four large bells.

=== Organ ===
The pipe organ was built in 1897 by Johannes Klais. It had first two manuals and 14 stops. The organ was remodelled in 1962, again by Klais. In 1983, Fischer & Krämer Orgelbau expanded the organ further.
