= Nollig Castle =

Castle ruin near Lorch, Hesse, Germany

- Ruine Nollig
- Lorch, Hesse
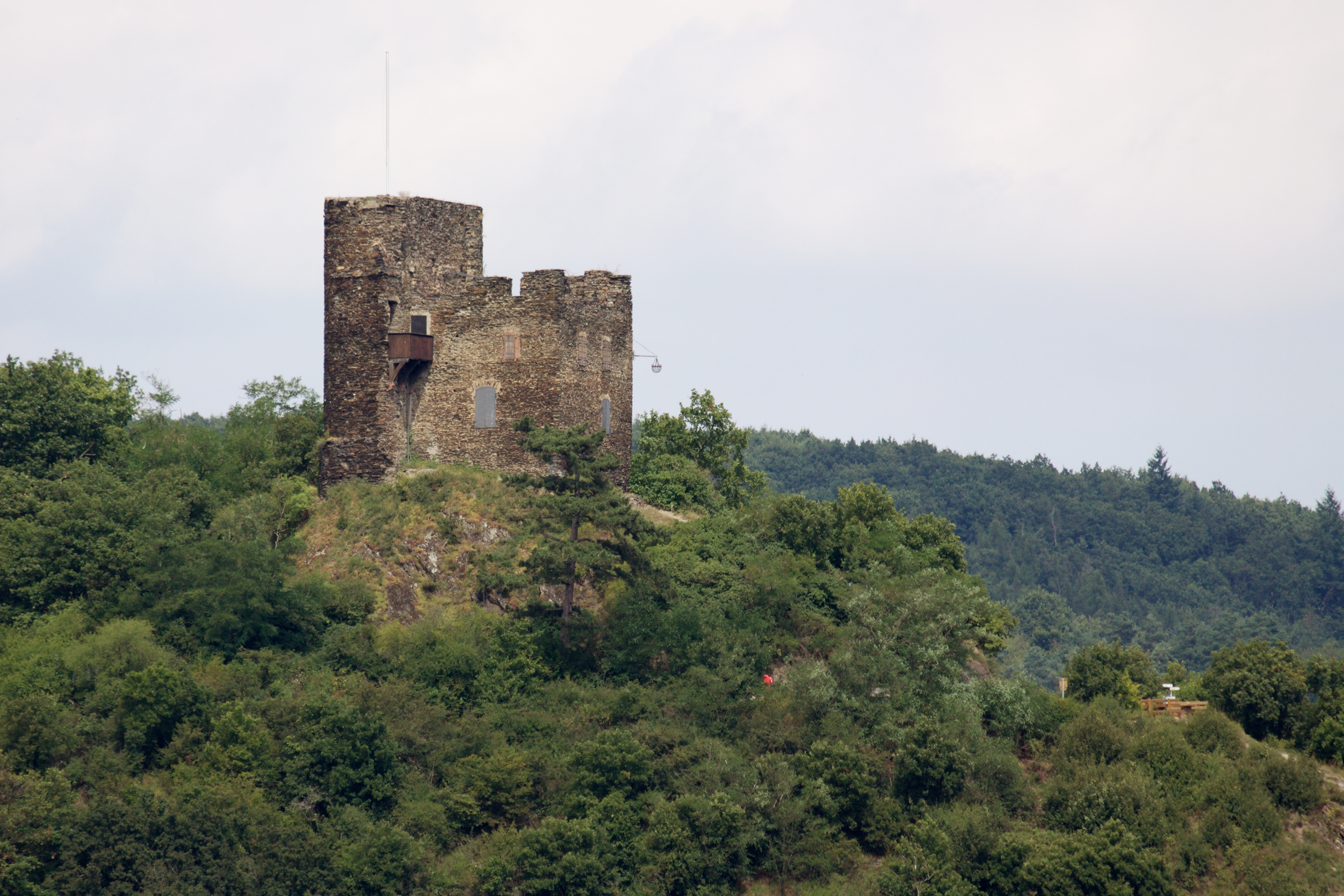

Location
- Coordinates: 50°2′50″N 7°48′0″E

Site history
- Built: 1300

Nollig Castle (German: Ruine Nollig) is a ruin above the village of Lorch in Hesse, Germany.
