= Lerch Bates =

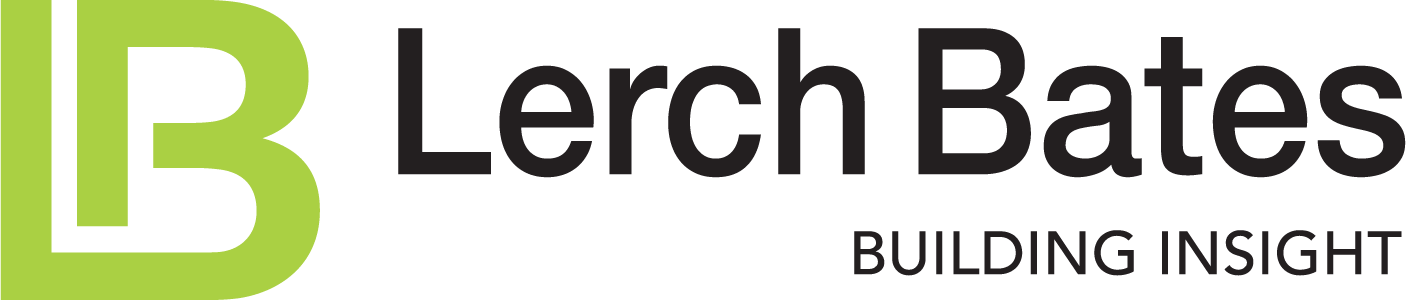
- Type: Employee Owned
- Industry: Engineering and service
- Founded: 1947
- Headquarters: Denver, USA
- Services: technical consultancy
- Number of employees: 300+
- Website: http://www.lerchbates.com

Lerch Bates is an international consulting services company specializing in the design and management of building systems with 36 offices in North America, Europe, the Middle East and India. Founded in 1947, focused on elevator consulting, they work with architects, developers, building investors, owners and managers on the design, sustainability and continuous use of building systems

== Projects ==
Some of the buildings and projects that Lerch Bates has contributed to:

- Burj Khalifa, Dubai
- Freedom Tower, New York City
- 201 Bishopsgate, London
- Petronas Towers, Kuala Lumpur
- Taipei 101, Taipei
- Russia Tower, Moscow
- Bank of China Tower, Hong Kong
- Trump International Hotel and Tower, Dubai
- Signature Tower, Nashville
- Moscow City Tower, Moscow
- Marina 101, Dubai
- Indira Gandhi International Airport, New Delhi
- Google Headquarters, Mountain View

== History ==
In 1947, Charles W. Lerch started a company performing maintenance and repairs, C. W. Lerch Co, (widely accepted as the first independent elevator consulting company) in Chicago. He later added elevator consulting as a side business. In 1964 Charles W. Lerch was joined by Vane Q. Bates and both men working full-time on elevator consulting. The firm moved to its offices to Denver, Colorado that same year and officed downtown in the Patterson Building on 17th Street (since demolished). The Company moved a number of times but has maintained its HQ in and around Denver. In 1974 the company was incorporated as Lerch Bates & Associates and by the 1980s building boom, and under the leadership of Quent Bates (CW Lerch having died in the early 1980s) Lerch Bates had 15 offices in North America. In 1985 Lerch Bates Limited in London was formed. In 1994 under the direction of Quent Bates Lerch Bates became an employee owned company.

In 1998 Lerch Bates designed the world's fastest elevators for the then world's tallest building, the Taipei Financial Centre / Taipei 101.
