= Lorsch (disambiguation) =

Lorsch may refer to several different things:

- Lorsch, a town in the Bergstraße district in Hesse, Germany
  - Lorsch Abbey, former one of the most renowned monasteries of the Carolingian Empire
  - Lorsch codex, an important historical document created between about 1175 to 1195 in the Monastery of Saint Nazarius in Lorsch, Germany

== People ==
- Jay Lorsch (1932–2025), American organizational theorist
- Robert Lorsch, Los Angeles businessman

== See also ==
- Lorch (disambiguation)
