= Wisper =

River in Germany

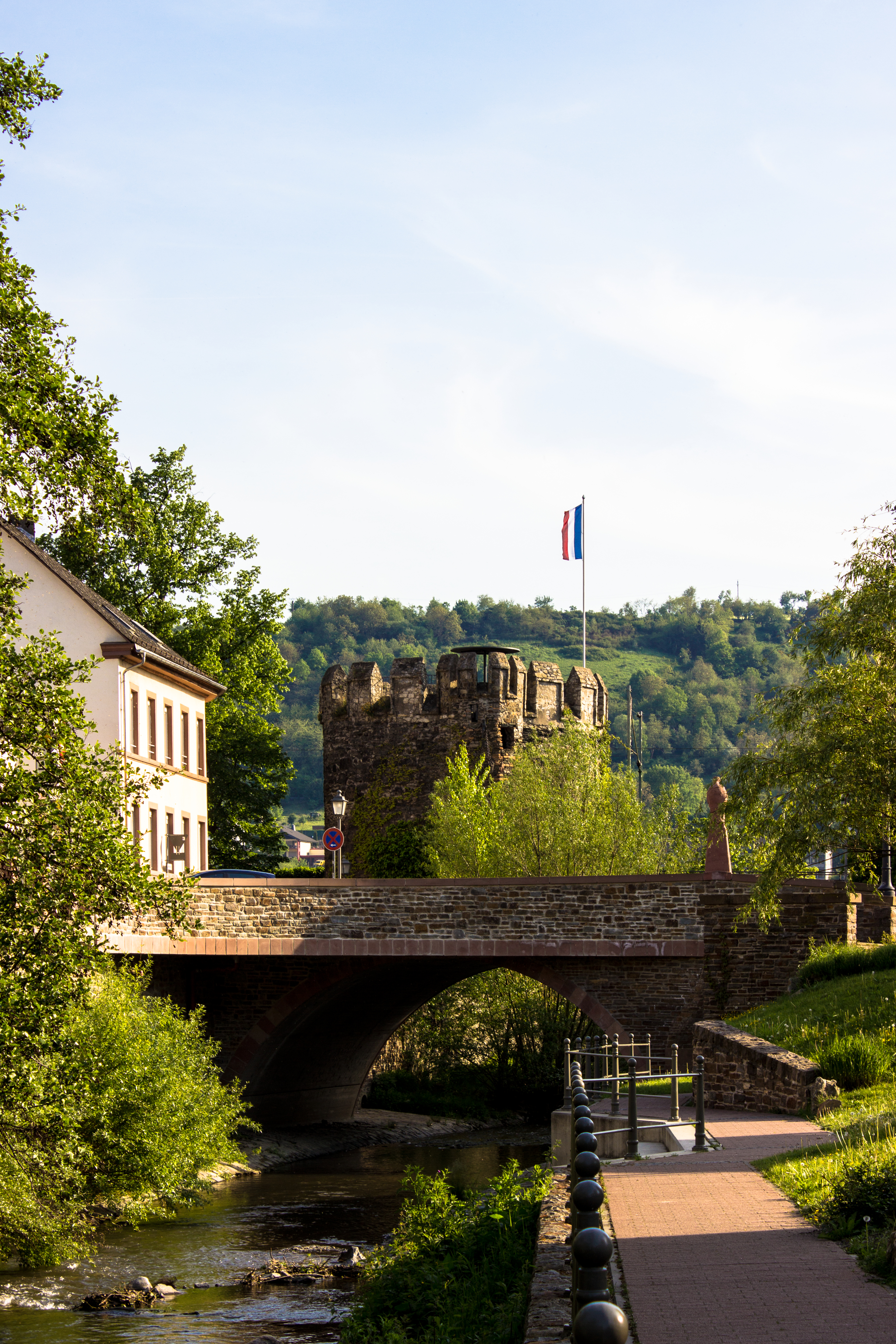
- Wisper at Lorch

Location
- Country: Germany
- State: Hesse

Physical characteristics
- Source
  - location: Taunus
- Mouth
  - location: Rhine
  - coordinates: 50.0429°N 7.8014°E
- Length: 29.7 km (18.5 mi)
- Basin size: 209 km^{2} (81 sq mi)

Basin features
- Progression: Rhine→ North Sea

The Wisper is a 29.7-kilometre-long (18.5 mi) river in Hesse, Germany, right tributary of the Rhine. Its source is in the western Taunus, Rheingau-Taunus-Kreis district, near a small village named Wisper (municipality Heidenrod). It flows southwest through a densely forested valley with some medieval castle ruins surrounded by a popular hiking area. A man-made lake, the Wispersee, is stocked with trout and is a popular fishing destination. The Wisper flows into the Rhine at Lorch.

The river ran through the temporary state Free State Bottleneck from 1919 to 1923.

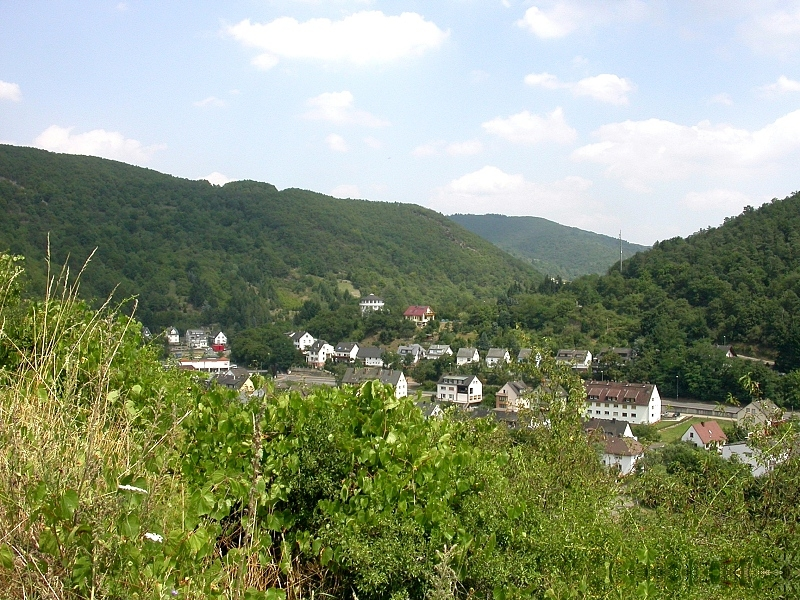
Wisper valley at Lorch

== See also ==
List of rivers in Hesse
