= Signature Tower =

Unbuilt planned skyscraper in Tennessee, US

- Signature Tower rendering
- Interactive map of the Signature Tower area

General information
- Status: Never built
- Type: Mixed use
- Location: 505 Church Street; Nashville, Tennessee; United States
- Coordinates: 36°9′45.9″N 86°46′48.9″W
- Cost: US$250-370 million

Height
- Antenna spire: 807 ft (246 m), originally 1,030 ft (314 m)

Technical details
- Floor count: 50, originally 70
- Floor area: 1,400,000 sq ft (130,000 m^{2})

Design and construction
- Architects: Smallwood, Reynolds, Stewart, Stewart & Associates
- Developer: Giarratana Development, LLC
- Structural engineer: Beaver Engineering (geotechnical); Rowan Williams Davies & Irwin, Inc. (wind)
- Main contractor: Turner Construction

Signature Tower was a projected mixed-use skyscraper which had been approved for construction in Nashville, Tennessee, United States. Groundbreaking was originally scheduled for 2007. When completed, it was to contain condominiums, office space, a Kimpton-brand Hotel Palomar Nashville, and retail space. The building was originally planned to have 70 stories and stand 1,030 feet (314 m) in height, which would have made it the tallest building in the Southern United States and the tallest building in the US outside of New York City and Chicago, surpassing Bank of America Plaza in Atlanta by 7 feet (2 m). However, in December 2008, developer Tony Giarratana announced that the project would be downsized, due to the economic recession. Giarratana stated that the number of condos would be reduced from around 600 to under 100, but the average condo size would more than double from an average of 1,500 square feet (140 m^{2}) to 3,500 ft^{2} (330 m^{2}). The height of the revised Signature Tower was to be 807 feet (246 m) and 50 stories.

The Signature Tower was being developed by Giarratana LLC at an estimated cost of US$250 to 370 million. The building's physical address would have been 505 Church Street, on the southwest corner of Church and Fifth Avenue North, which was for many years the location of a Cain-Sloan department store. Giarratana announced on July 18, 2006 that it had slated Turner Construction Co. of New York to complete the project.

Construction of the building was slated to begin once half of the 400 residential apartment units had been sold. By late December 2007, 102 of the 400 units had been presold. When the plan was overhauled in December 2008, this timetable was revoked.

The official website for Signature Tower was taken offline around December 2009. In November 2011, Giarratana announced that he was going to use the site to build a smaller, mixed use tower called 505 CST, which was eventually redeveloped into a residential tower called 505.

== See also ==
- List of tallest buildings in Nashville
- Paramount Tower
- 505 (Nashville)
