= Maristella Lorch =

American literary critic

Maristella de Panizza Lorch is one of the leading post-war critics of Italian literature working in America. She is affiliated with Columbia University. She is also author of the novel Mamma in Her Village. She is the founder and Director Emerita of the Italian Academy for Advanced Studies in America at Columbia University, a multi-disciplinary research and international scholarly exchange institute.
