= Carl Lorck =

Norwegian painter (1829–1882)

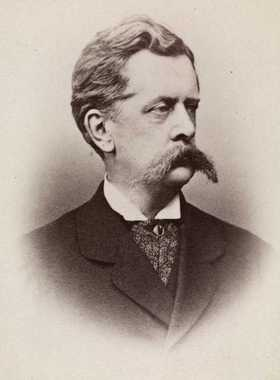
Carl Julius Lorck ca. 1880

Carl Lorck (18 May 1829 – 28 October 1882) was a Norwegian painter.

Carl Julius Lorck was born in Trondheim, Norway. He spent one year at a military academy in Christiania (now Oslo). In 1852 he moved to Düsseldorf where he studied under Karl Ferdinand Sohn and Adolph Tidemand between 1853 and 1858. He is represented with two works in the National Gallery of Norway Skipsgutten (1861) and Handelsjøden i loshytten (1863).
