= Georg August Lerch =

German architect and politician

- Born: 11 August 1792
- Died: 20 March 1857
- Occupation: Architect

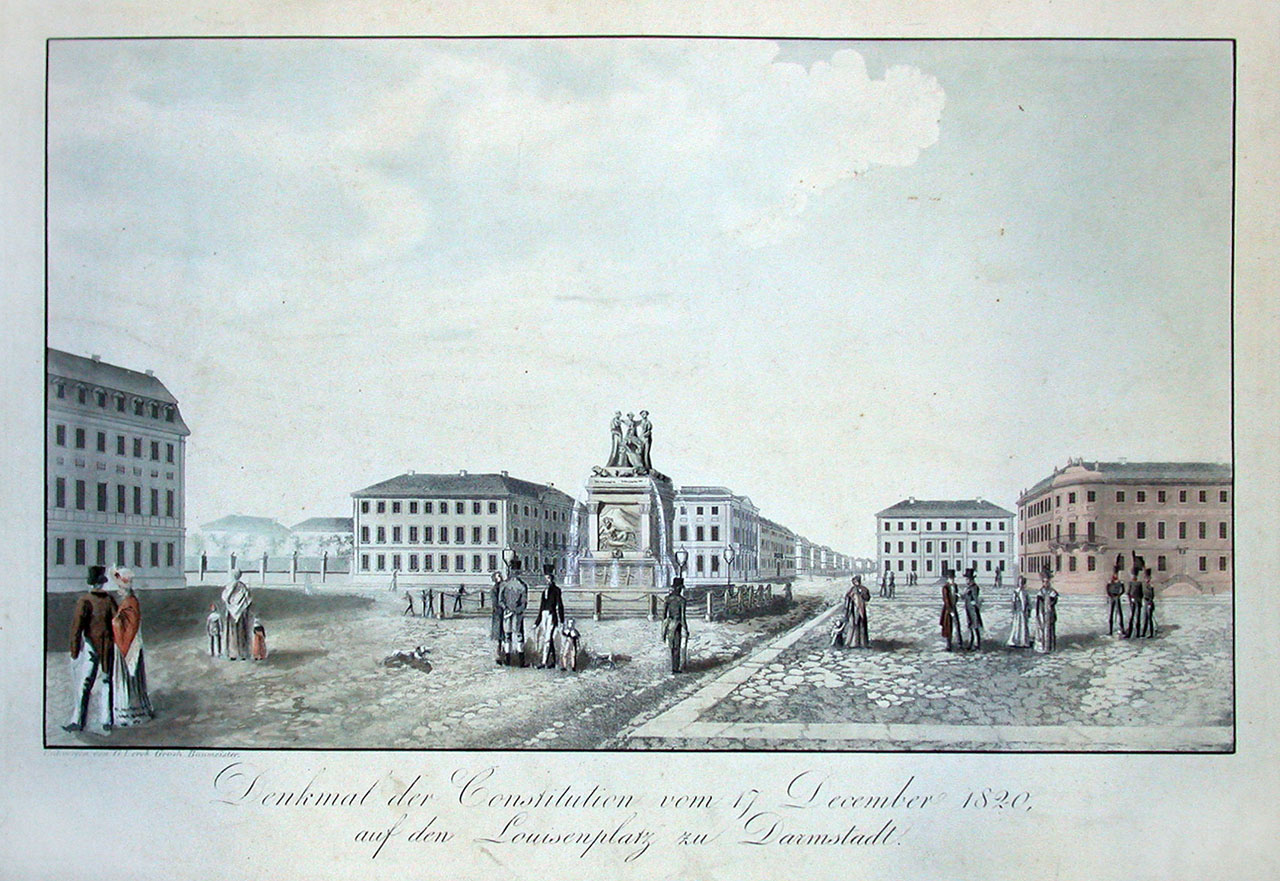
View of the Luisenplatz (1820s), from a drawing by Lerch

Georg August Lerch (11 August 1792, Darmstadt - 20 March 1857, Darmstadt) was a German architect and politician; a member of the Second Chamber of the Land Estates of the Grand Duchy of Hesse.

== Biography ==
He was the son of the Master bricklayer, Johann Philipp Lerch (1762–1800), and his wife, Maria Magdalena, née Schneider. From 1801 to 1806, he attended the gymnasium in Darmstadt. He became the building manager and mathematics teacher at the School of Architecture in 1812. He moved to Karlsruhe in 1815, to join the Architectural Institute, directed by Friedrich Weinbrenner.

After spending some time in Italy, he returned to Darmstadt in 1818 and became a Master builder. Two years later, he married Anna Elisabeth Fersenfeld (1792–1847). In 1821, he was appointed a teacher of mathematics and architecture at the newly created Realschule. The following year, he was named the official Master Builder for the city of Darmstadt.

In 1832, he was promoted to Master Builder for Starkenburg Province. After 1836, he served as a Master Builder for the court and the military and, only one year later, became the Oberbaurat (Senior Building Officer) and Oberbaudirektor (Head of Construction). In 1844, Grand Duke Louis II awarded him the Knight's Cross of the Order of Philip the Magnanimous. Finally, in 1854, he was named an honorary Geheimrat (Privy Councilor). He retired two years later.

From 1841 to 1849, he served as an elected member of the Land Estates; representing Darmstadt. During the revolutions of 1848, he was a member of the Vorparlament in Frankfurt.

Among his most familiar designs are the hall of the casino in Giessen, and St. Paul's Parish Church in Offenbach am Main. Together with Georg Moller, he converted Prince Christian's Palace, on the Luisenplatz, into the seat of the legislature. He entered a contest to design the Ludwigsmonument, but his entry was not selected.

== Sources ==
- Lerch, Georg August. Hessische Biografie. In: Landesgeschichtliches Informationssystem Hessen (LAGIS).
- Biography @ the Stadtlexikon Darmstadt
