= Central Hessian =

German dialect

The Central Hessian dialect is a German dialect subgroup of the Hessian branch of Central German. It has only partly undergone the High German (HG) consonant shift but has had a different vowel development than most other German dialects.

== Location ==
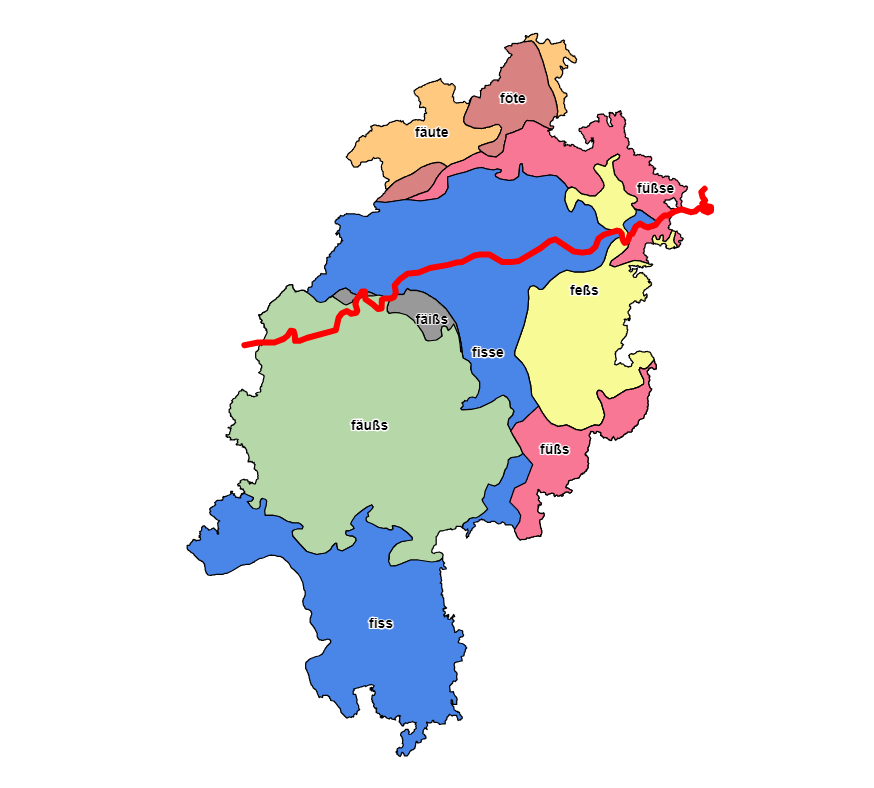

The dialect is spoken around the center of the German state of Hesse. The area where the dialect is historically spoken corresponds roughly to the green area on the map.

== Phonetics and development from Middle High German ==
The dialect sounds softer than HG and often "glues" words together. It also is hard to understand for non-natives, fellow Germans as well.

=== Vowels ===
Monophthongs
	front	central	back
high	i: ɪ		u: ʊ
mid	e: ɛ	ə	o: ɔ ɔ:
low			a: a

Diphthongs: /aɪ̯ aʊ̯ ɛɪ̯ ɔʊ̯ ɔɪ̯/

=== Consonants ===
Structure: /_V - V_V - V_/
	bilabial	labiodental	alveolar		postalveolar		lateral	velar*
strong	/p-b-p/	/f-v-f/	/d/					/k-g-k/
soft (after back vowel)	/b-v-b/	/v/	/d-ɾ-d/					/g-ɣ-x/
soft (after front vowel)	/b-v-b/	/v/	/d-ɾ-d/					/g-(ɟ)-(ç)/
continuous	/m/		/n/				/l/	/ŋ/
hissing (after back vowel)			/z-z-s/	/ts-dz-ts/	/ʃ-ʒ-ʃ/	/tʃ~dʒ~tʃ/		/h-ɣ-x/
hissing (after front vowel)			/z-z-s/	/ts-dz-ts/	/ʃ-ʒ-ʃ/			/h-ʒ-ʃ/

The "R" can be realised as a bunch of different phonemes, some dialects use the uvular trill, some the velar, some the alveolar, some do the English r and others just tap.

==== Development ====
Central Hessian did partake only partially in the HG consonant shift and later further underwent a general gradation process for almost all consonants.

In general

- /h/ from /k/ develops a vowel to consonant harmony; becomes [ʃ~ʒ] after front vowels and [x~ɣ] after back vowels
- /g/ also develops this harmony but tends to elide after front vowels, only to merge with /h/ after back vowels

==== HG consonant shift (partially) + Further consonant gradation ====
===== HG Consonant shift compared with Standard German =====
West Germanic [t] shifted to an affricate [ts] in initial and medial position, but to a fricative [s] if geminated or in final position. West Germanic [k] only shifted in non-geminated medial and final position, developing a front/back allophonic contrast between [x] and [ç]. WG [p] also only shifts in non-geminated medial and final position to [f]. Initial and geminated medial [p] does not shift to [pf], a parallel in all West Central German dialects. WG [ð] merges into [d], and [d] does not shift to [t]. Like in Standard German but unlike to many Upper German varieties WG [b] and [g] are not affected by the shift. Unlike Standard German [s] also palatalizes after [r], a feature of Upper German.

===== Consonant gradation =====
As a default rule between two vowels every consonant gradates into a weaker form, but at the end of a word is hardened (made voiceless). Voiceless consonants get voiced, voiced consonants turn to (voiced) fricates. Initial [s] is default voiced to [z]. [b] gradates to [v], [d] gradates to [r]. [ç] merges into [ʃ], the former back vs front allophony of [x] and [ç] thus is widened further into a phonetic contrast. [g] gradates to [ɣ] or [ɟ]/[j] depending on the preceding vowel, mut merges with [x] when in final position to either [x] or [ʃ].

=== Development of the vowels from MHG onwards ===
==== Diphthongisation ====
Like in modern HG long î and û underwent diphthongation.

î > ai

like in "t͡sa͜ɪt" MHG zît - time, and

û > au

like in "bɾa͜ʊɣə" MHG brûchen - to need

==== MHG diphthongs ====
Unlike HG the old diphthongs did not merge with diphthongizing long vowels but merged instead:

ei, eu, ou > â

some other diphthongs switched within

ie > ei

uo > ou (with some exceptions becoming u)

iu > oi (more consistent than HG)

==== Vowel heightening ====
In contrast to HG long ô, â and ê did not remain unchanged, they shifted to the now vacant position of the long high vowels.

ê > î

ô > û

Since long ô was now also vacant, â also shifted.

â > ô

==== Endings ====
All MHG inflectional endings were shortened.

-ən > -ə [en]

-ə > -◌ [e]

==== Other changes ====
It has to be mentioned tho, that this is only the basic development and every dialect may have some small changes. Short open i in some dialects shifted to [ɛ], short u to [ɔ]. Old long i in some dialects behaves differently and became oi in word final position or was simply shortened: "enoi"/"enin" - "hinein"

The development of vowels before "r" is especially tricky, because younger generations tend to not pronounce it in coda position. It may follow the same patterns as if there would be no "r", shifting further towards the evolving vowel realisation; "durch" [dɔrʃ~dɔʃ] (through) or even further away from it; "erst" [irʃt~iɐʃt] (first).

==== Vowel development as a chainshift ====
As a huge number of vowels shifted due to different reasons, their route of changing forms a chain of vowels supplementing each other.

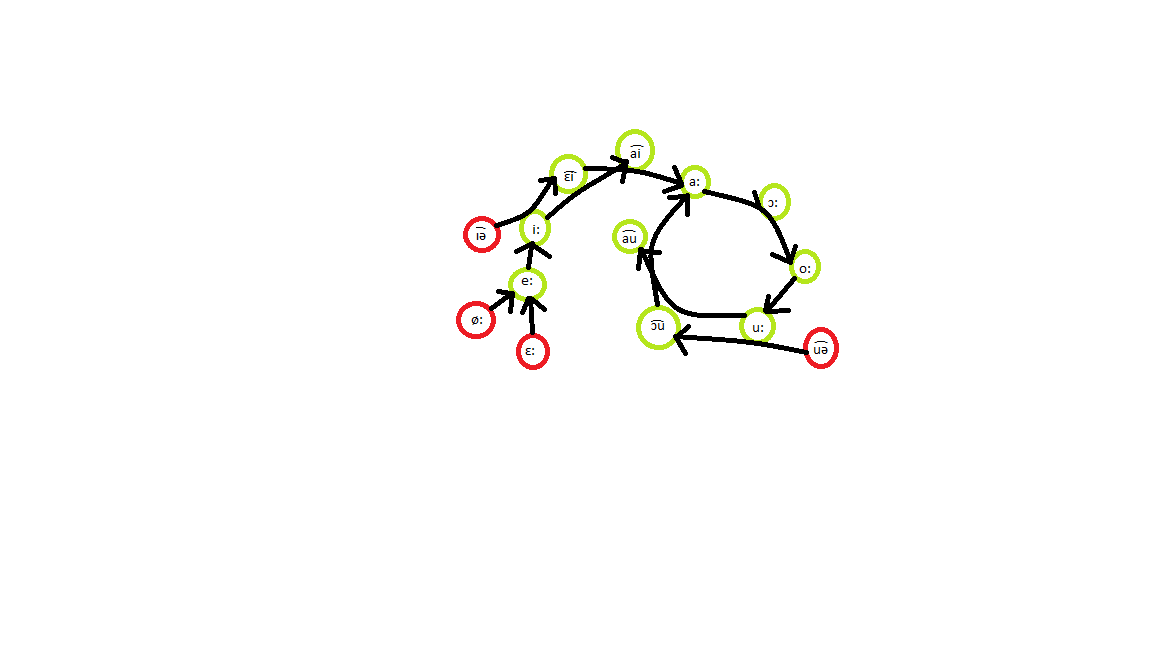

== Grammar ==
The dialect basically features the same grammar as High German. Verbs inflect for person, number and tense and periphrastically for mood and aspect. Pronouns to a higher degree than nouns inflect for case and number.

There are four cases and two numbers.

=== Pronouns ===
"Before a consonant/before a vowel", this also depends on the dialect. Pronouns like in Dutch and Italian have a strong and a weak form ( > ), whether or not they are focused on and where they locate in the sentence; the weak forms glue to their surroundings and are often used for the direct object. All in all, the weak forms are steadily replacing the strong forms with each generation:

"machemir" > "macheme" > "mâme" > "mamme" = We make (in VS word order)

1st	sg	pl
nom.	aich > ich	mir > me
poss.	ma(i)(n)/min	ûser > ûse
dat.	mir > me	us
acc.	mich	us

2nd	sg	pl
nom.	dau > de	ir > e
poss.	da(i)/din	auer/oier > aue/oie
dat.	dir > de	oih
acc.	dich	oih

HG "Duzen".

2nd polite	
nom.	sei > se
acc.	sei > se
poss.	irn
dat.	îne

The 2nd polite triggers 3rd pl forms on the verb. HG "Siezen".

3rd	sg m	sg n	sg f	sg "one"	pl
nom.	er > e	dés > es	sei > se	ma	dei > de
acc.	în > in	dés > es	sei > se	ân	dei > de
poss.	sa(i)/sin		ir	âm sa(i)/sin	dêne ir
dat.	îm > im		ir	âm	dêne

=== Verbs ===
Suffix chart:

	sg	pl
1st	-X	-e
2nd	-st	-t
3rd	-t	-e

==== Present ====
Verb in the present often show a simple ablaut system, where the plural forms take the stem vowel, whilst the singular may trigger a mutation. In some dialects or as a consequence of hypercorrections this ablaut spreads to new forms.

To come	sg	pl
1st	kum	kumme
3rd	kimt	kumme
2nd	kimst	kumt

The mutation can also involve the consonant; in the following examples from /h/ [x~ɣ] to /h/ [ʃ] and from /g/ [x~ɣ] to /ɡ/ [ç~ʝ] or [◌].

To make	sg	pl	To say	sg	pl
1st	mach	mache		sâg	sâge
3rd	mecht	mache		sê(g)st	sâge
2nd	me(ch)st	macht		sê(g)t	sâ(g)t

The verb "to be" is irregular

To be	sg	pl
1st	sa(i)(n)/ben/bin	sa(i)/sin
3rd	is	sa(i)/sin
2nd	saist	sait

==== Past ====
Although there is an equivalent to the German "Imperfekt", it is much more preferred to use the periphrastic "Haben/Sein-Perfekt". It is constructed by using the forms of "to have" (or "To be", if the verb describes an action of moving around and is unchangeably intransitive) in the present tense in combination with the past-participle form which is often highly irregular, but in theory should stick to the blueprint "geSTEMt".

To have	sg	pl
1st	hû/hun	
3rd	h(a/o/u)st	hû/hun
2nd	h(a/o/u)t	h(a/o/u)(b/n)t

As one of the most used verbs, "to have" is not only highly irregular but also easily adopted from other dialects or HG, which means, that this table is only one of many possibilities.

Examples of the past participle:

come - gekumme

said - gesâ(g)t

seen - gesî

been - gewêse

done - gedô

made - gemaht

==== Conjunctive ====
The Present Conjunctive is produced by using the present conjunctive forms of the verb "to do" in combination with the infinitive (identical to the 3rd person plural).

would do	sg	pl
1st	dêt	dête
3rd	dêt	dête
2nd	dêst	dêt(e)t

The Past Conjunctive is produced by using the present conjunctive forms of the verbs "to have" and "to be" in combination with the past participle. The same distinction is made as in the past.

would have	sg	pl
1st	hét	hétte
3rd	hét	hétte
2nd	hé(t)st	hétt(e)t

would be	sg	pl
1st	wêr/wîr	wêrn/wîrn
3rd	wêr/wîr	wêrn/wîrn
2nd	wêrst/wîrst	wêrt/wîrt

==== Passive ====
The Passive mood is formed by using the verb "to get" in the particular tense.

Contrary to HG and English, tho, no special case switch is necessary to denote the roles anew.

English: I say it. It is said to me.

HG: Ich sage es. Es wird mir gesagt.

Central Hessian: Aih sâg‿es. Aih krei‿es gesât.

To get	sg	pl
1st	krei	kreie
3rd	kreit	kreie
2nd	kreist	kreit

Present: ToGet + infinitive

Present Conjunctive: WouldDo + participle + "kreie"

Past: ToHave/ToBe + participle + "gekreit"

Past Conjunctive: WouldHave/WouldBe + participle + "gekreit"

=== Nouns ===
Nouns seldom inflect for case anymore. This is instead done by the definite and indefinite articles, which also can help to differentiate gender (m, f, n). Like pronouns, articles have a strong and a weak form, the strong serves as demonstrative pronoun or number respectfully whilst the weak is purely grammatical.

Definite Article
	m	n	f	pl
nom.	der > de	däs > es	dei > de	
acc.	dên > en	däs > es	dei > de	
poss.	dêm __ sa(i)/sin > em __ sa(i)/sin		der __ ir/irn > de __ ir/irn	dêne __ ir/irn > de __ ir/irn
dat.	dêm > em		der > de	dêne > de

Indefinite Article
	m	n	f	pl
nom.	ân > en		âne > e	(e par)
acc.	ân > en		âne > e	(e par)
dat	âm > em		er > e	(e par)
poss.	âm __ sa(i)/sin > em __ sa(i)/sin		er __ ir/irn > e __ ir/irn	(e par) __ ir/irn

Plurality is marked via the suffix -e (dâg, dâge = day, days), rarely -er (haus, hoiser) or Umlaut alone (kau, koi = cow, cows).

Central Hessian employs diminutives more often than Standard German: wutz = pig, but wutzî (little pig is used instead). The suffixes are -che (HG -chen), the rare -l(a(i)) (HG -lein) and -î/-je (no equivalent), both former ones may trigger Umlaut (boub, baube, boibsje = boy, boys, little boy). Diminutives indicate plural number via a subtle vowel change to -cher/-jer/-je. The difference between -che and -î/-je is that -che is used after single plosives preferredly whilst -î/-je is used after consonant clusters and sibilants (katz, kätzî/kätzje = cat, kitten; haus, hoisî = house, small house).

== Comparison with New High German ==
Here two Examples of the dialect; the differences between the dialects of the villages of Ostheim and Heldenbergen in the city of Nidderau, only two kilometres away from each other.

Ostheim (Uustim): "Wû witten da klîhâ hî hû?" HG: "Wo willst du dein Kleeheu hin haben?" - Where do you want to have your clover hay put?

Heldenbergen (Helbische): "Wû wisten da hâ hî hû?" HG: "Wo willst du dein Heu hin haben?" - Where do you want to have your hay put?

The dialect has a large corpus of inherent dialectal Westgermanic vocabulary, Latin and French borrows, and imports from other dialects after the Flight and expulsion of Germans (1944–1950) from other territories.

examples
Hessian	High German	French*	English	
retûr	zurück	retour	back	
wutz	Sau		boar	
watz	Eber		male pig	
trottwa	Gehweg	trottoir	sidewalk	
gaul	Pferd		horse	cp. HG Gaul
kolter	Decke		blanket	
kordel	Schnur			
stub	Wohnung			cp. Stube
hinkel	Huhn		chicken	
pén/sjoul	Schule		school	from Latin "penna" - quill
simpel	einfach		simple	cp. simpel
deetz/kopp	Kopf	tête	head	
kneipsje	Messer(-chen)		knife	

But it does not have to use different words to be quite incomprehensible, because shared lexemes are hard to recognise as a result of several vowel shifts.

Hessian	High German	English
dau	du	thou (you)
dou	tun	do
kou	Kuh	cow
aih	ich	I
stî	stehen	stand
âg	Auge	eye
uv	auf	up
pan	Pfanne	pan
