= Lorch am Rhein =

Place in Hesse, Germany

Lorch
- Town
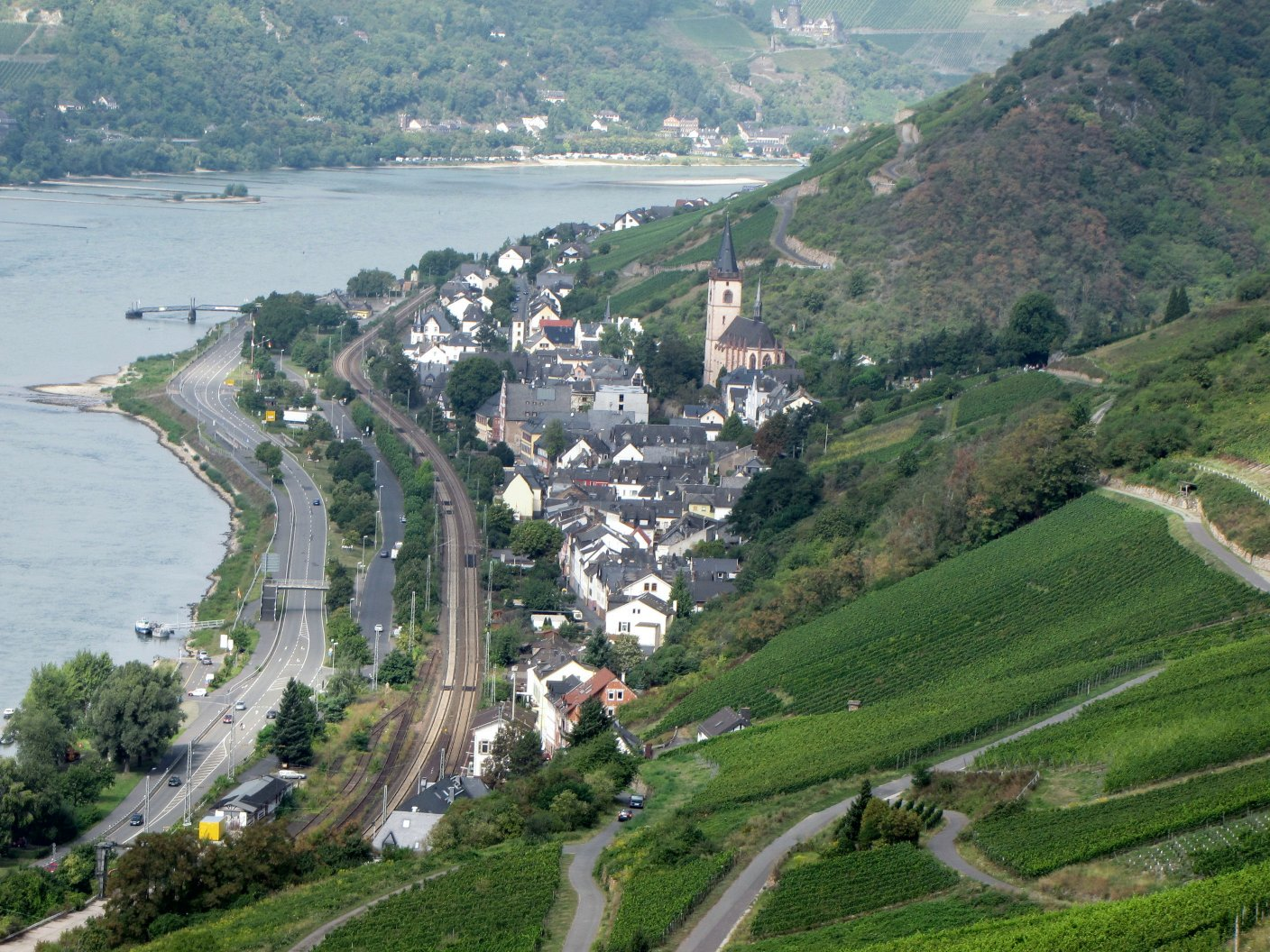

- Coat of arms

- Location of Lorch within Rheingau-Taunus-Kreis district
- Interactive map of Lorch
- Location within Germany Location within Hesse
- Coordinates: 50°2′39″N 7°48′12″E
- Country: Germany
- State: Hesse
- Admin. region: Darmstadt
- District: Rheingau-Taunus-Kreis
- Subdivisions: 3 districts

Government
  - Mayor (2019–25): Ivo Reßler

Area
  - Total: 54.43 km^{2} (21.02 sq mi)
- Elevation: 81–450 m (266–1,476 ft)

Population (2025-12-31)
  - Total: 3,802
  - Density: 69.85/km^{2} (180.9/sq mi)
- Time zone: UTC+01:00 (CET)
  - Summer (DST): UTC+02:00 (CEST)
- Postal codes: 65391
- Dialling codes: 06726
- Vehicle registration: RÜD
- Website: www.stadt-lorch-rheingau.de

Lorch am Rhein (German pronunciation: [ˌlɔʁç ʔam ˈʁaɪn]) is a small town in the Rheingau-Taunus-Kreis in the Regierungsbezirk of Darmstadt in Hesse, Germany. It belongs to the Rhine Gorge World Heritage Site.

== Geography ==
=== Location ===
The town is characterized by winegrowing and tourism.

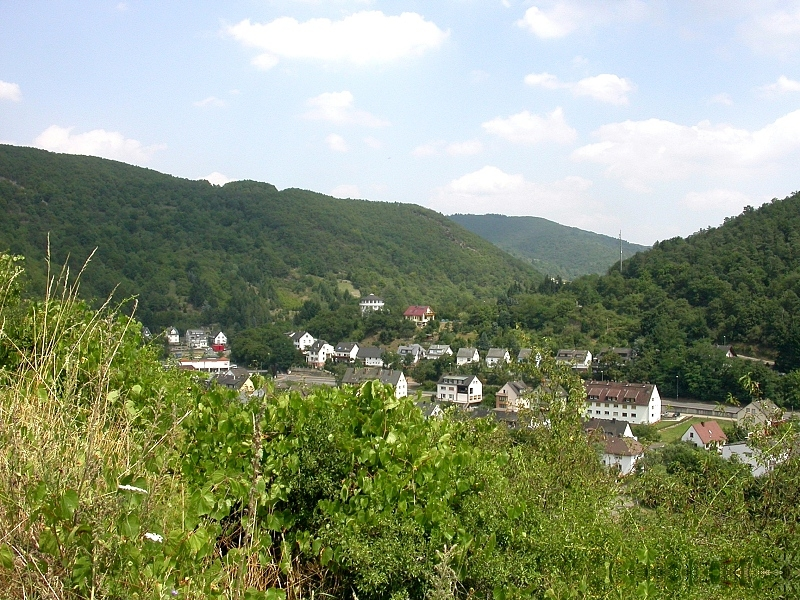
Wispertal

Lorch lies in the southwestern part of the Rheingau-Taunus-Kreis in the foothills of the Rheingaugebirge (range), some 10 km north of the bend in the Rhine near Rüdesheim. The town owes its picturesque setting in the Middle Rhine Valley between Rüdesheim am Rhein and Sankt Goarshausen to its location at the mouth of the Wisper and to its steep vineyards. The town's municipal area stretches into the richly wooded Wisper valley along Landesstraße (State Road) 3033 between Lorch and the district seat of Bad Schwalbach. The town is a state-recognized recreational resort (Erholungsort). The Rheinsteig, the new hiking trail on the Rhine's right bank leading from Wiesbaden to Bonn, runs on the Rhine heights. In the Rhine near Lorch lies the island and nature conservation area called Lorcher Werth.

=== Constituent communities ===
Lorch's Stadtteile (subdivisions of the town), besides the main town, also called Lorch, are Lorchhausen, Espenschied, Ransel, Ranselberg, and Wollmerschied.

== History ==
The area was settled quite early on, first by the Celts, and then, during the Christian Era, by the Ubii and later the Mattiaci. In the first century CE, the Romans advanced to the Taunus. The Alamanni followed, and with the onset of the Migration Period, the Franks.

The town's oldest documentary mention is a document from 1085 in which Archbishop Wezilo documented a donation, from Mainz Cathedral Canon Embricho to the cathedral chapter, of a number of holdings, among them a house and vineyards in Lorch.

In the Middle Ages, Lorch served as the northern bastion of the Archbishopric of Mainz facing toward the Rheingau. Beginning in the twelfth century, Lorch found itself at the southern end of the Rheingauer Gebück, a kind of border defence made out of an impenetrable “hedge” of stunted trees (the word itself comes from the German root of bücken, meaning “stoop”, a reference to the trees’ thick, low boughs). This was put in place by the Archbishops of Mainz.

In the thirteenth century, a parish first documented in 1254 was established in Lorch.

In 1460, 1631, 1794, and in the final phase of the Second World War, there was warfare in Lorch, which sometimes brought considerable destruction.

=== Twentieth century ===
On 10 January 1919, the Free State of Bottleneck, a provisional statelike entity between occupation zones after the First World War, was proclaimed, with Lorch as de facto “capital”. Even today, many of the microstate’s coats of arms in the town still recall this time.

In the early 1960s, the Bundeswehr came to town with its Flugabwehrregiment 5 (“Antiaircraft Regiment 5”). A new settlement, the Ranselberg, was built for soldiers and their families. The barracks in the picturesque Wisper Valley represented an important economic factor for the town of Lorch. Many local people found work in the barracks, the attached post administration, the munitions depot, the equipment depot, and the sanitary depot.

In the course of Bundeswehr reform, the barracks were closed in 1993. At the site, the underground Gerätehauptdepot Lorch-Wispertal (“Main Equipment Depot”) and the likewise underground Sanitätshauptdepot Lorch-Rheingau (“Main Sanitary Depot”) remained. In November 2003, the complete abandonment of the Bundeswehr post was announced. The sanitary company was to be withdrawn in early 2008. By 31 December 2007, the Sanitätshauptdepot was to be dissolved, and a year later the Gerätehauptdepot was to disappear. Some 280 civilians would thereby lose their jobs.

Meanwhile, various businesses have set up in the abandoned Bundeswehr facilities, which has offset the job losses due to the military's pullout to a certain extent.

== Religion ==
Lorch's character is mostly Catholic, and serving this community is the Gothic church St. Martin. St. Bonifatius, Lorchhausen, serves the Lorchhausen village. Since 1908, the Protestant parishioners have been gathering in a church room in a house at Oberweg 4.

== Politics ==
=== Town council ===
The five-yearly municipal elections yielded the following results:

Parties and voter communities		2021		2016		2011		2006		2001	
Parties and voter communities		%	Seats	%	Seats	%	Seats	%	Seats	%	Seats
LiLo	Liste Lorch	39.8	8	–	–	–	–	–	–	–	–
FWG	Free Voters	23.3	4	28.6	5	22.9	4	21.7	4	14.2	3
CDU	Christian Democratic Union of Germany	21.8	4	41,3	8	40.4	8	45.6	9	49.1	11
SPD	Social Democratic Party of Germany	15.1	3	30.1	6	26.2	5	25.2	5	29.2	7
Grüne	Bündnis 90/Die Grünen (Greens)	–	–	–	–	10.5	2	7.5	1	7.5	2
Total		100.0	19	100.0	19	100.0	19	100.0	19	100.0	23
Voter turnout in %		60.7		57.3		54.7		55.0		60.6	

=== Mayor ===
On June 16, 2019, Ivo Reßler (independent) was elected mayor with 51.2 percent of the votes in a runoff against incumbent Jürgen Helbing (CDU). Voter turnout was 63.6 percent. He took office on February 1, 2020.

=== Former Mayors ===
- 2008 – 2020 : Jürgen Helbing (CDU)
- 1990 – 2008 : Günter Retzmann (SPD)
- 1984 – 1990 : Alexander Schneider
- 1972 – 1984 : Wolfgang Muno (CDU)
- 1948 – 1971 : Karl Hofmann
- 1946 – 1948 : Dipl. Ing. Diel
- 1921 – 1945 : Edmund Pnischeck (Zentrum)
- 1913 – 1921 : Ferdinand Travers
- 1903 – 1913 : Dr. Freiherr von Scheibner
- 1891 – 1903 : Jakob Schulte
- 1877 – 1891 : Friedrich Altenkirch
- 1868 – 1877 : Franz Carl Dahlen
- 1862 – 1868 : Jakob Germersheimer
- 1848 – 1862 : Thomas Travers
- 1846 – 1848 : P. Meister
- 1815 – 1846 : Thomas Germersheimer
- 1809 – 1815 : Lorenz Altenkirch
- 1781 – 1809 : J. M. Travers
- 1768 – 1779 : Peter Happ
- 1735 – 1761 : J. J. Molitor
- 1733 – 1734 : Johannes Peter Zipf
- 1726 – 1733 : Hilarius Walter
- 1687 – 1725 : Johann Gottfried Perabo
- 1685 – 1687 : Wilhelm Oliger
- 1645 – 1685 : Balthes Schmitt
- 1640 – 1645 : Johann Schnocks
- 1634 – 1640 : Adam Heil
- 1631 – 1634 : Paulus Pistorius
- 1623 – 1624 : Johann Rapenecker
- 1606 – 1620 : Elias Buschkink
- 1582 – 1606 : Jakob Sauth
- 1574 – 1582 : Johannes Dreis
- 1560 – 1574 : Daniel Kogler
- 1556 : Johann von Stockheim
- 1544 : Friedrich von Stockheim
- 1532 : Friedrich Schlüchterer
- 1518 : Friedrich von Stockheim
- 1517 : Diether Hilchen
- 1507 : Wilhelm Jud
- 1485 : Johann Hilchen
- 1477 : Heinrich von Bergen
- 1476 : Heinrich von Staffel
- 1468 : Frederich Hilchen
- 1466 : Heinrich von Staffel
- 1461 : Frederich Hilchen
- 1460 : Junker Werner Broich
- 1458 : Ritter Philip Hilchen
- 1448 : Ritter Philip Hilchen
- 1445 : Clais von Scharpenstein
- 1443 : Ritter Philip Hilchen
- 1441 : Gerlach von Breitbach
- 1404 : Johann Saneck von Waldeck
- 1401 : Friedreich Gawer von Waldeck
- 1368 : Johann Saneck von Waldeck
- 1363 : Ritter Johann Herwin
- 1353 : Jakob von Ebernsheim
- 1337 : Johann Marschall von Waldeck and Ritter Heinrich von Glimendal
- 1319 : Johann Marschall von Waldeck
- 1316 : Hermann Helkin
- 1298 : Johann von Waldeck
- 1284 : Hugo Helkin
- 1254 : Ritter Petrus
- 1167 : Ritter Hugo

=== Town partnerships ===
- Ligugé, Vienne, France since 1976
- Saint-Benoît, Vienne, France since 1976

"Adopted wine town":

- (Germany) Gütersloh, North Rhine-Westphalia

== Culture and sightseeing ==
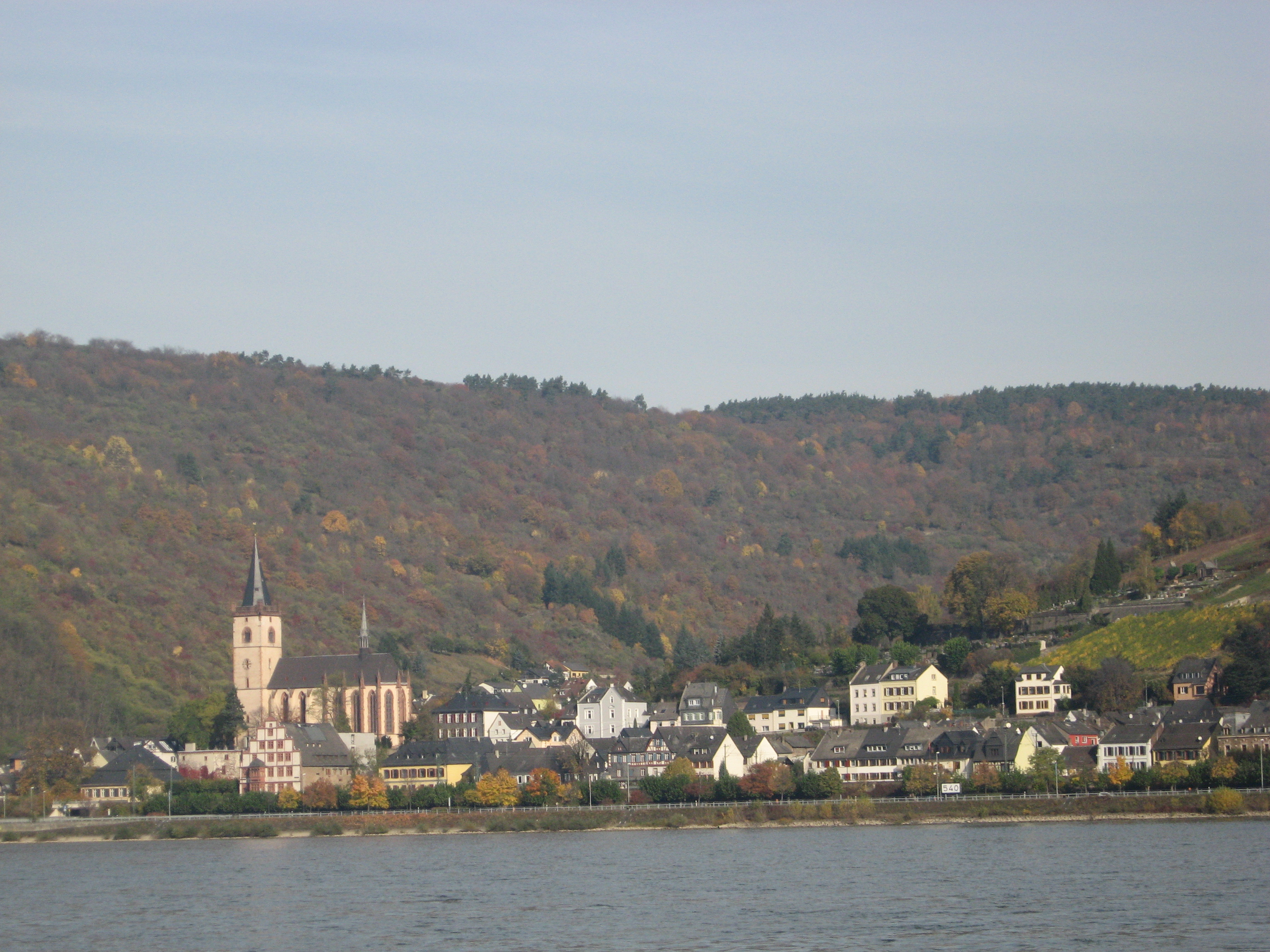
Lorch

Culturally and politically, Lorch is part of the Hessian Rheingau.

=== Museums ===
The Robert-Struppmann-Museum is the town's local history museum. It houses valuable carvings, documents, sculptures, and sacral objects, among other things a woodcarving of John the Baptist's severed head from the twelfth century and the seated Madonna with Christ Child and grapes from the early fourteenth century. It is open weekend afternoons in spring, summer, and autumn and also serves as a tourist information centre. There are many brochures to be had there for free. Moreover, books about Lorch's history and winegrowing are on sale there.

=== Buildings ===
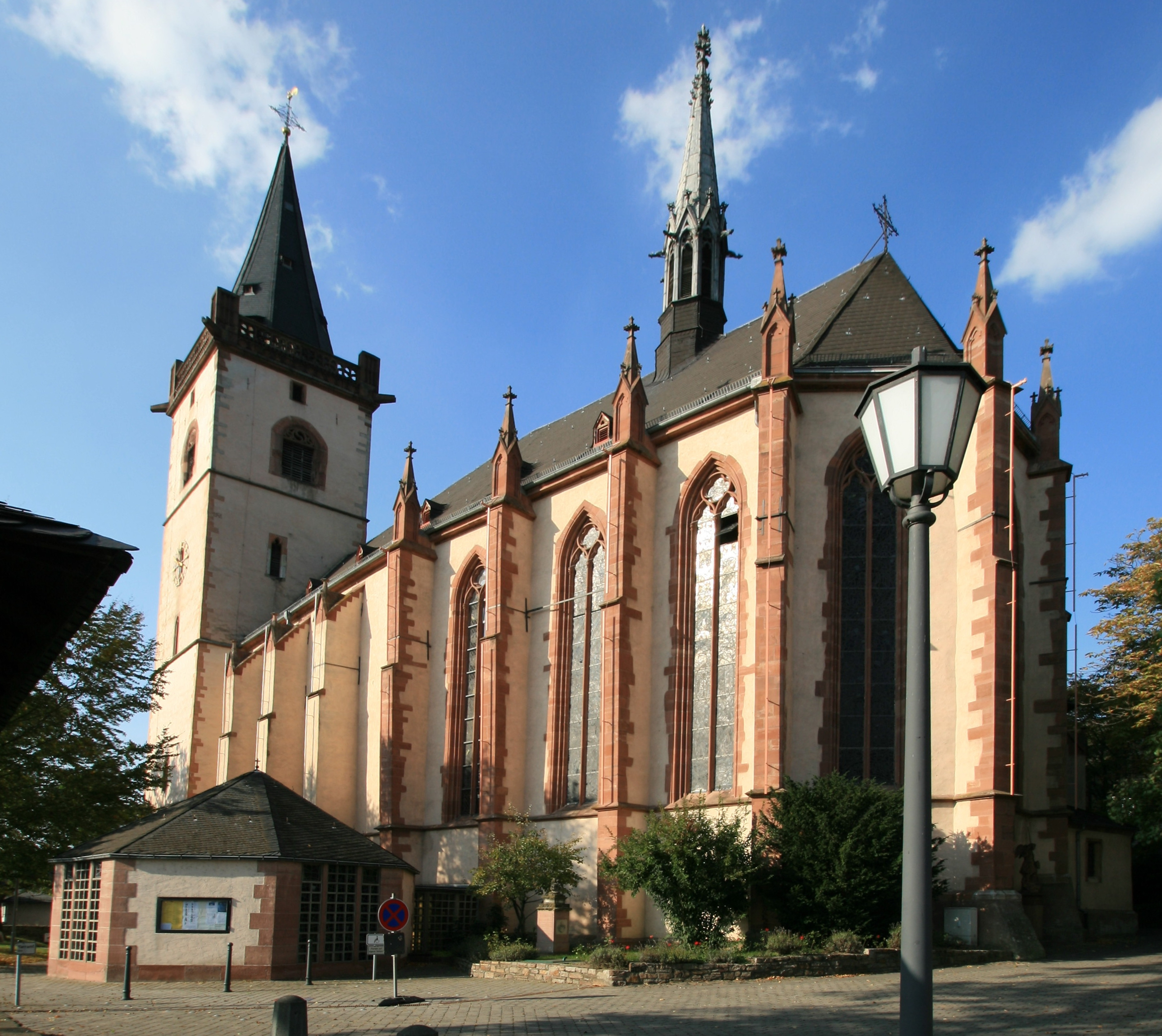
St. Martin, Lorch

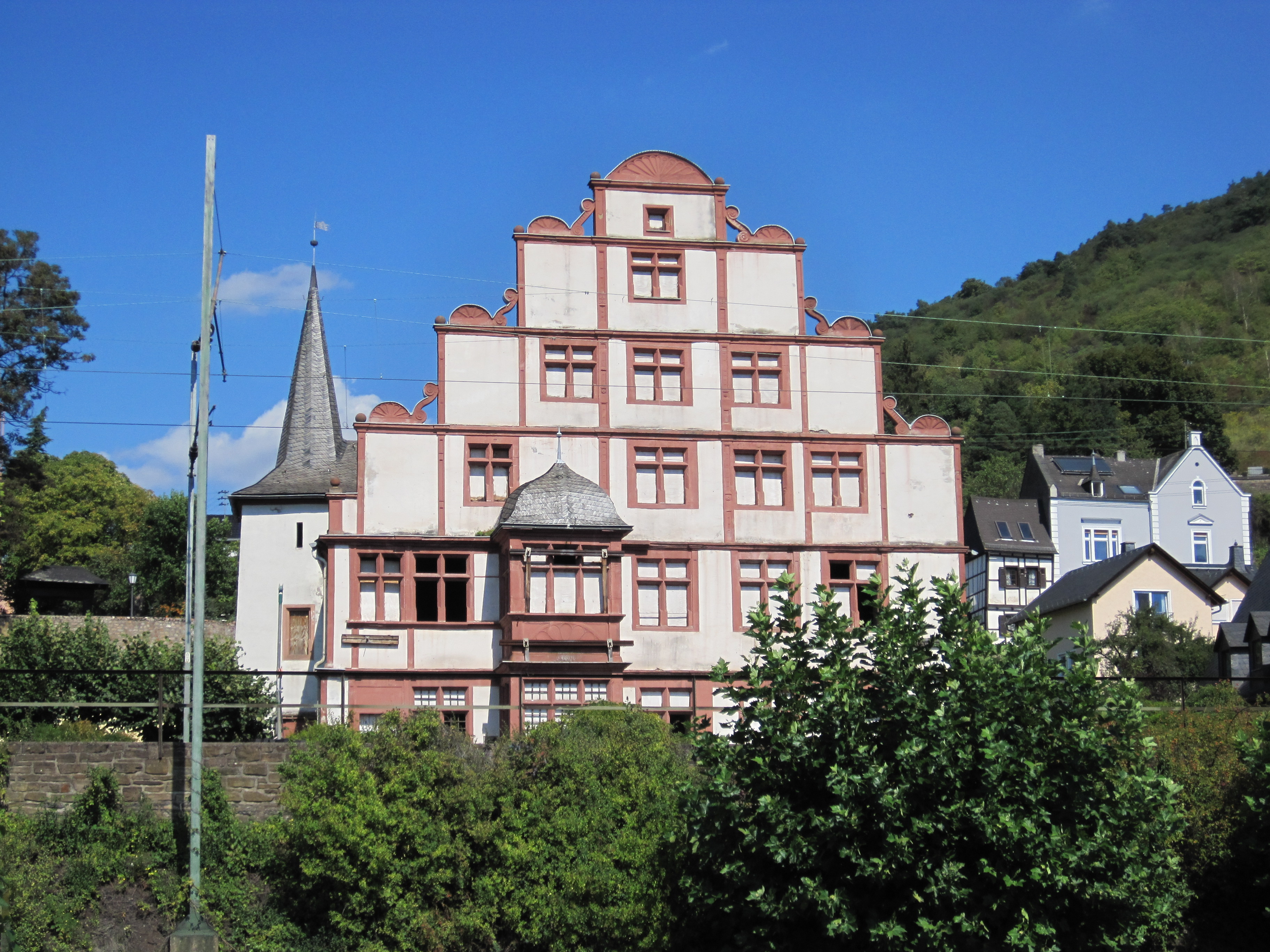
Hilchenhaus

- The Catholic Pfarrkirche St. Martin (Saint Martin's Parish Church) was completed in the fourteenth century. The Gothic building was built over the remains of a still partly preserved Late Romanesque basilica. Its centrepiece is the high altar by the master Hans from Worms, installed in 1483. As the biggest, and perhaps first-carved altar, originally conceived as monochrome, it is of outstanding value for art history. The church therefore is secured, but open for visitors between Easter and October on Saturdays between 14:00 and 17:00 and on Sundays between 11:00 and 17:00.
- Hilchenhaus, from the mid sixteenth century, is well known as the "loveliest Renaissance building on the Middle Rhine". At this time, however, it is a ruin owing to a failed hotel-building venture whose construction work wrought various damages and marring. Sadly, there is no money to renovate it again.
- Nollig ruins, are the remains of the old town fortifications on a craggy ridge overlooking the town.
- The Strunk (“Stump”), is an old fortification tower from 1527, which once also served as a prison.
- Leprosenhaus (“Leprosy House”) with Round Tower – here in the Middle Ages, lepers were given care; at the time it still lay outside the town.
- Hexenturm ("Witches' Tower") – this served in the Middle Ages to keep wrongdoers and witches under lock and key. It was last used in the early eighteenth century.

=== Regular events ===
- Tal total is held yearly on the last Saturday in June. On this day, Bundesstraße 42 between Rüdesheim and Koblenz on the Rhine's right bank and Bundesstraße 9 on the left between Bingen and Koblenz are closed to motorized traffic and left free for cyclists and skaters.
- Kerb (church consecration festival) is held yearly on the weekend after 8 September.
- Kulturtage (“Culture Days”), occurs in late September and early October; theatre, concerts, exhibitions.
- Weihnachtsmarkt (“Christmas Market”), is held annually on the Saturday before the onset of Advent.
- Rheingau Musik Festival has held an annual concert in the church St. Martin, typically an organ concert, since 1988.

== Economy and infrastructure ==
=== Transport ===
Lorch lies on Bundesstraße 42 (Koblenz–Wiesbaden) and the railway line that roughly parallels it. It is some 40 km to the Autobahn interchange in Wiesbaden where the B 42 meets the A 66 going towards Frankfurt. There is a connection to the Autobahn “cross” at Mainz (A 61/A 60, Cologne/Koblenz/Ludwigshafen) across the Wiesbaden-Schierstein bridge over the Rhine; and by way of the Rhine ferries at Lorch and Kaub to the on-ramps at Laudert and Rheinböllen (about 15 km).

The town is served by regional services on the East Rhine Railway sponsored by the Rhein-Main-Verkehrsverbund.

Moreover, there is the Wiesbaden-Lorchhausen ORN (Omnibusverkehr Rhein-Nahe) busline.

The Rheinsteig, the new hiking trail from Wiesbaden to Bonn by way of the Ehrenbreitstein fort runs on the Rhine heights of Lorch.

After dealings with the Bundesvermögensverwaltung (“Federal Estate Administration”), the town of Lorch managed to build an industrial park with some 20 firms on the lands formerly occupied by the barracks.

=== Winegrowing ===
Winegrowing in Lorch is run within the Rheingau winegrowing region under the Großlage (roughly “vineyard group” or “appellation”) “Burgweg”. The individual vineyards are Schlossberg (53 ha), Kapellenberg (58 ha), Krone (13 ha), Pfaffenwies (35 ha), and Bodental-Steinberg (23 ha).

The dominant grape variety is Riesling, but Pinot noir has a growing share of the harvest. From the wines, Edelbrände and sekt are also produced.

The grapes grow in hillside vineyards on stony, heat-storing slate- and quartzite-bearing earth. The great expanse of water that is the Rhine accounts for the temperature balance, working as a reflector off which sunlight shines, thereby strengthening it.

=== Education ===
- Wisperschule (primary school)

== Famous people ==
The town's noble family named itself “von Lorch”. Their most important representative was Johann Hilchen (1484–1548), knight and Imperial field marshal.

=== Sons and daughters of the town ===
- Dr. Gerhard Schwenzer (b. 1938). From 1983 to 2005 he was the Catholic Bishop of Oslo.

=== People with links to the town ===
- Dr. Peter Paul Nahm (1901–1981), German politician (CDU) and Staatssekretär (deputy to a cabinet minister).
