= Mais où est donc Ornicar? =

French mnemonic

Mais où est donc Ornicar?, or Mais où est donc Carnior? and also Ormais, où est donc Nicar? is a French-language mnemonic that aids in remembering the language's coordinating conjunctions. The sentence translates as "Where, therefore, is Ornicar?", or "Where is Ornicar, then?", and is a phonetic juxtaposition of the words mais (but), ou (or), et (and), donc (therefore), or (however), ni (nor), and car (for).

The phrase is often learned by French school children, and has influenced French culture, including having an asteroid named after it and inspiring the titles of numerous literary, musical and cinematic works.

== Composition ==
Mnemonic in English	but	where	is	therefore	Ornicar [name]			?
Mnemonic	mais†	où	est	donc†	Ornicar			?
Conjunctions	mais†	ou	et	donc†	or	ni	car	
Conjunctions in English	but	or	and	therefore, so	yet	nor	for	
† Same word in mnemonic and conjunctions								

Of the seven coordinating conjunctions included in the mnemonic, four (et, ou, ni and mais) are universally recognised as such in French. Car is also a coordinating conjunction meaning "because". Or is sometimes considered a coordinating conjunction, but can also be treated as an adverb. The grammatical reference work Le Bon Usage classes these six as conjunctions, but donc as an adverb—it also notes that other constructions such as puis, aussi and seulement have some characteristics of coordinating conjunctions.

Although two of the words in the sentence, mais and donc, have both the same spelling and meaning as the conjunctions they represent, it relies on homophones of other French words. The French relative pronoun où (where) is used because it sounds the same as ou (or); the presence of a grave accent differentiates their orthography. Est, a third-person present tense form of the verb être (to be), is used instead of the conjunction et (and); again, in this context, they are pronounced similarly. Ornicar—which is intended to sound like a French given name, even though it is not one —is used as a proper noun to represent the three conjunctions or (now/yet), ni (nor) and car (for).

== Use ==
The phrase is taught to and used by French children to help them remember their language's most common coordinating conjunctions. In Quebec, the version Mais où est donc Carnior ? (with the words or and car swapped) is used. In English, the similar mnemonic acronym "FANBOYS" may be used to remember its coordinating conjunctions.

== Cultural influence ==
The journal of the Freudian field published by the University of Paris's Department of Psychoanalysis was called Ornicar ?. The 1979 French film Mais où et donc Ornicar uses this mnemonic as its title. The French astronomer Alain Maury named an asteroid, 17777 Ornicar, after the phrase following its discovery by the OCA-DLR Asteroid Survey at Caussols on 24 March 1998. According to the JPL Small-Body Database, the naming "honor[ed] French teachers around the world" and "provides one answer to [the] question" of where to find Ornicar. In 2002, Gérald Stehr and Willi Glasauer published a children's book titled Mais où est donc Ornicar? (English version as "But, where, therefore, is Oscar, the Platypus?")—it features Ornicar as a platypus (ornithorynque in French). In 2005, the Quebec rock group Les Dales Hawerchuk released a song with the title "Mais où est donc Carnior ?". The mnemonic became the subject of a satirical "Chuck Norris fact" in France: "Chuck Norris knows where Ornicar is".

== See also ==
- French conjunctions
- French grammar
- List of mnemonics
