= French phonology =

Sound system of the French language

French phonology is the sound system of French. This article discusses mainly the phonology of all the varieties of Standard French. Notable phonological features include the uvular r present in some accents, nasal vowels, and three processes affecting word-final sounds:

- liaison, a specific instance of sandhi in which word-final consonants are not pronounced unless they are followed by a word beginning with a vowel;
- elision, in which certain instances of /ə/ (schwa) are elided (such as when final before an initial vowel);
- enchaînement (resyllabification), in which word-final and word-initial consonants may be moved across a syllable boundary, with syllables crossing word boundaries.

An example of the above is this:

- Written: On a laissé la fenêtre ouverte.
- Meaning: "We left the window open."
- In isolation: /ɔ̃ a lɛse la fənɛːtʁə uvɛʁtə/
- Together: [õ.na.le.se.la.f(ø)nɛ.tʁu.vɛʁt] (Paris), [õ.nɑ.le.se.la.f(ə)nɛː.tʁu.vɛʁt] (Northern)

== Consonants ==
Consonant phonemes of French
		Labial	Dental/ Alveolar	Palatal (-alveolar)	Dorsal
Nasal		m	n	ɲ	(ŋ)
Plosive	voiceless	p	t		k
Plosive	voiced	b	d		ɡ
Fricative	voiceless	f	s	ʃ	ʁ
Fricative	voiced	v	z	ʒ	ʁ
Approximant	plain		l	j	ʁ
Approximant	labialized			ɥ	w

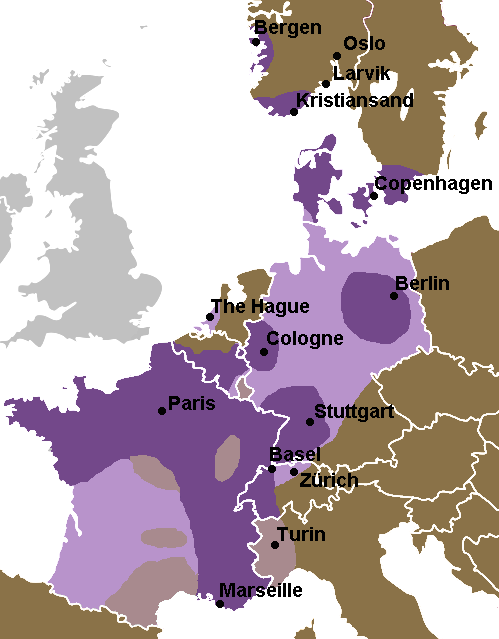
Distribution of guttural r (such as [ʁ ʀ χ]) in Europe in the mid-20th century. not usual only in some educated speech usual in educated speech general

Phonetic notes:

- /n, t, d/ are laminal denti-alveolar [n̪, t̪, d̪], while /s, z/ are dentalised laminal alveolar [s̪, z̪] (commonly called 'dental'), pronounced with the blade of the tongue very close to the back of the upper front teeth, with the tip resting behind lower front teeth.
- Word-final consonants are always released. Generally, /b, d, ɡ/ are voiced throughout and /p, t, k/ are unaspirated.
- /l/ is usually apical alveolar [l̺] but sometimes laminal denti-alveolar [l̪]. Before /f, ʒ/, it can be realised as retroflex [ɭ].
- In current pronunciation, /ɲ/ is merging with /nj/.
- The velar nasal /ŋ/ is not a native phoneme of French, but it occurs in loan words such as camping, smoking, and kung-fu, and in the pseudo-anglicism footing ('jogging'). Some speakers who have difficulty with this consonant realise it as a sequence [ŋɡ] or replace it with /ɲ/. It could be considered a separate phoneme in Meridional French, e.g. pain /pɛŋ/ ('bread') vs. penne /pɛn/ ('quill').
- The approximants /j, ɥ, w/ correspond to the close vowels /i, y, u/. While there are a few minimal pairs (such as loua /lu.a/ 'rented' (third person sg.) and loi /lwa/ 'law'), there are many cases where there is free variation.
- Belgian French may merge /ɥ/ with /w/ or /y/.
- Some dialects of French have a palatal lateral /ʎ/ (French: l mouillé, 'wet l'), but in the modern standard variety, it has merged with /j/. See also Glides and diphthongs, below.
- The French rhotic has a wide range of realizations: the voiced uvular fricative [ʁ], also realised as an approximant [ʁ̞], with a voiceless positional allophone [χ], the uvular trill [ʀ], the alveolar trill [r], and the alveolar tap [ɾ]. These are all recognised as the phoneme /r/, but [r] and [ɾ] are considered dialectal. The most common pronunciation is [ʁ] as a default realisation, complemented by a devoiced variant [χ] in the positions before or after a voiceless obstruent or at the end of a sentence. See French guttural r and the map in this section.
- Velars /k/ and /ɡ/ may become palatalised to [kʲ⁓c] and [ɡʲ⁓ɟ] before /i, e, ɛ/, and more variably before /a/. Word-final /k/ may also be palatalised to [kʲ]. Velar palatalisation has traditionally been associated with the working class, though recent studies suggest it is spreading to more demographics of large French cities.
- The voiced postalveolar fricative /ʒ/ is often labialized [ʒʷ].

Example words
Voiceless				Voiced			
IPA	Example		Gloss	IPA	Example		Gloss
/p/	/pu/	pou	'louse'	/b/	/bu/	boue	'mud'
/t/	/tu/	tout	'all', 'anything' (possibility)	/d/	/du/	doux	'sweet' (food, feelings), 'gentle' (person), 'mild' (weather)
/k/	/ku/	cou	'neck'	/ɡ/	/ɡu/	goût	'taste'
/f/	/fu/	fou	'crazy'	/v/	/vu/	vous	'you (pl. or formal)'
/s/	/su/	sous	'under', 'on' (drugs), 'in' (packaging), 'within' (times)	/z/	/zu/	zou	'shoo'
/ʃ/	/ʃu/	chou	'cabbage', 'lovely' (person, pet)	/ʒ/	/ʒu/	joue	'cheek'
				/m/	/mu/	mou	'soft', 'weak' (stronger: person, actions)
				/n/	/nu/	nous	'we, us'
				/ɲ/	/ɲu/	gnou	'gnu' (dated, /ɡnu/ in modern French)
				/ŋ/	/kuŋ.fu/	kung-fu	'kung-fu'
				/l/	/lu/	loup	'wolf'
				/ʁ/	/ʁu/	roue	'wheel'

=== Geminates ===
Although double consonant letters appear in the orthographic form of many French words, geminate consonants are relatively rare in the pronunciation of such words. The following cases can be identified.

The geminate pronunciation [ʁʁ] is found in the future and conditional forms of the verbs courir ('to run') and mourir ('to die'). The conditional form il mourrait [il.muʁ.ʁɛ] ('he would die'), for example, contrasts with the imperfect form il mourait [il.mu.ʁɛ] ('he was dying'). Most modern speakers have reduced [ʁʁ] to [ʁ] in other words, such as il pourrait ('he could'). Other verbs that have a double ⟨rr⟩ orthographically in the future and conditional are pronounced with a simple [ʁ]: il pourra ('he will be able to'), il verra ('he will see').

When the prefix in- combines with a base that begins with n, the resulting word is sometimes pronounced with a geminate [nn] and similarly for the variants of the same prefix im-, il-, ir-:

- inné [i(n).ne] ('innate')
- immortel [i(m).mɔʁ.tɛl] ('immortal')
- illisible [i(l).li.zibl] ('illegible')
- irresponsable [i(ʁ).ʁɛs.pɔ̃.sabl] ('irresponsible')

Other cases of optional gemination can be found in words such as syllabe ('syllable'), grammaire ('grammar') and illusion ('illusion'). The pronunciation of such words, in many cases a spelling pronunciation, varies by speaker and gives rise to widely varying stylistic effects. In particular the gemination of consonants other than the liquids and nasals /m n l ʁ/ is "generally considered affected or pedantic". Examples of stylistically marked pronunciations include addition [ad.di.sjɔ̃] ('addition') and intelligence [ɛ̃.tɛl.li.ʒɑ̃s] ('intelligence').

Gemination of doubled ⟨m⟩ and ⟨n⟩ is typical of the Languedoc region as opposed to other southern accents.

A few cases of gemination do not correspond to double consonant letters in the orthography. The deletion of word-internal schwas (see below), for example, can give rise to sequences of identical consonants: là-dedans [lad.dɑ̃] ('inside'), l'honnêteté [lɔ.nɛt.te] ('honesty'). The elided form of the object pronoun l' ('him/her/it') is also realised as a geminate [ll] when it appears after another l to avoid misunderstanding:

- Il l'a mangé [il.lamɑ̃.ʒe] ('He ate it')
- Il a mangé [il.amɑ̃.ʒe] ('He ate')

Gemination is obligatory in such contexts.

Finally, a word pronounced with emphatic stress can exhibit gemination of its first syllable-initial consonant:

- formidable [fːɔʁ.mi.dabl] ('terrific')
- épouvantable [e.pːu.vɑ̃.tabl] ('horrible')

=== Liaison ===
Many words in French can be analyzed as having a "latent" final consonant that is pronounced only in certain syntactic contexts when the next word begins with a vowel. For example, the word deux /dø/ ('two') is pronounced [dø] in isolation or before a consonant-initial word (deux jours /dø ʒuʁ/ → [dø.ʒuʁ] 'two days'), but in deux ans /døz‿ɑ̃/ (→ [dø.zɑ̃] 'two years'), the linking or liaison consonant /z/ is pronounced.

== Vowels ==
Vowels of Parisian French, from Collins & Mees (2013:225–226). Some speakers merge /œ̃/ with /ɛ̃/ (especially in the northern half of France) and /a/ with /ɑ/. In the latter case, the outcome is an open central [ä] between the two (not shown on the chart).

Standard French contrasts up to 13 oral vowels and up to 4 nasal vowels. The schwa (in the center of the diagram next to this paragraph) is not necessarily a distinctive sound. Even though it often merges with one of the mid front rounded vowels, its patterning suggests that it is a separate phoneme (see the subsection Schwa below).

The table below primarily lists vowels in contemporary Parisian French, with vowels present only in other dialects in parentheses.

Oral
	Front		Central	Back
	unrounded	rounded	Central	Back
Close	i	y		u
Close-mid	e	ø	ə	o
Open-mid	ɛ (ɛː)	œ	ə	ɔ
Open	a			(ɑ)

Nasal
	Front		Back
	unrounded	rounded	Back
Open-mid	ɛ̃	(œ̃)	ɔ̃
Open			ɑ̃

While some dialects feature a long /ɛː/ distinct from /ɛ/ and a distinction between an open front /a/ and an open back /ɑ/, Parisian French features only /ɛ/ and just one open vowel /a/ realised as central [ä]. Some dialects also feature a rounded /œ̃/, which has merged with /ɛ̃/ in Paris.

In Metropolitan French, while /ə/ is phonologically distinct, its phonetic quality tends to coincide with either /ø/ or /œ/.

Example words
Vowel	Example		
IPA		Orthography	Gloss
Oral vowels
/i/	/si/	si	'if'
/e/	/fe/	fée	'fairy'
/ɛ/	/fɛ/	fait	'does'
/ɛː/^{†}	/fɛːt/	fête	'party'
/y/	/sy/	su	'known'
/ø/	/sø/	ceux	'those'
/œ/	/sœʁ/	sœur	'sister'
/ə/^{†}	/sə/	ce	'this'/'that'
/u/	/su/	sous	'under'
/o/	/so/	sot	'silly'
/ɔ/	/sɔʁ/	sort	'fate'
/a/	/sa/	sa	'his'/'her'
/ɑ/^{†}	/pɑt/	pâte	'dough'
Nasal vowels
/ɑ̃/	/sɑ̃/	sans	'without'
/ɔ̃/	/sɔ̃/	son	'his'
/ɛ̃/	/bʁɛ̃/	brin	'twig'
/œ̃/^{†}	/bʁœ̃/	brun	'brown'
Semi-vowels
/j/	/jɛʁ/	hier	'yesterday'
/ɥ/	/ɥit/	huit	'eight'
/w/	/wi/	oui	'yes'
† Not distinguished in all dialects.

=== Close vowels ===
In contrast with the mid vowels, there is no tense–lax contrast in close vowels. However, non-phonemic lax (near-close) [ɪ, ʏ, ʊ] appear in Quebec as allophones of /i, y, u/ when the vowel is both phonetically short (so not before /v, z, ʒ, ʁ/) and in a closed syllable, so that e.g. petite [pə.t͡sɪt] 'small (f.)' differs from petit 'small (m.)' [pə.t͡si] not only in the presence of the final /t/ but also in the tenseness of the /i/. Laxing always occurs in stressed closed syllables, but it is also found in other environments to various degrees.

In Metropolitan French, /i, u/ are consistently close [i, u], but the exact height of /y/ is somewhat debatable as it has been variously described as close [y] and near-close [ʏ].

=== Mid vowels ===
Although the mid vowels contrast in certain environments, there is a limited distributional overlap so they often appear in complementary distribution. Generally, close-mid vowels (/e, ø, o/) are found in open syllables, and open-mid vowels (/ɛ, œ, ɔ/) are found in closed syllables. However, there are minimal pairs:

- open-mid /ɛ/ and close-mid /e/ contrast in final-position open syllables:
  allait [a.lɛ] ('was going'), vs. allé [a.le] ('gone');
- likewise, open-mid /ɔ/ and /œ/ contrast with close-mid /o/ and /ø/ mostly in closed monosyllables, such as these:
  jeune [ʒœn] ('young'), vs. jeûne [ʒøn] ('fast', verb),
  roc [ʁɔk] ('rock'), vs. rauque [ʁok] ('hoarse'),
  Rhodes [ʁɔd] ('Rhodes'), vs. rôde [ʁod] ('[I] lurk'),
  pomme [pɔm] ('apple'), vs. paume [pom] ('palm'),
  bonne [bɔn] ('good', feminine), vs. Beaune [bon] ('Beaune', the city).

Beyond the general rule, known as the loi de position among French phonologists, there are some exceptions. For instance, /o/ and /ø/ are found in closed syllables ending in [z], and only [ɔ] is found in closed monosyllables before [ʁ], [ɲ], and [ɡ].

The Parisian realization of /ɔ/ has been variously described as central [ɞ] and centralized to [ɞ] before /ʁ/, in both cases becoming similar to /œ/.

The phonemic opposition of /ɛ/ and /e/ has been lost in the southern half of France, where these two sounds are found only in complementary distribution. The phonemic oppositions of /ɔ/ and /o/ and of /œ/ and /ø/ in terminal open syllables have been lost in almost all of France, but not in Belgium or in areas with an Arpitan substrate, where pot and peau are still opposed as /pɔ/ and /po/.

=== Open vowels ===
The phonemic contrast between front /a/ and back /ɑ/ is sometimes no longer maintained in Parisian French, which leads some researchers to reject the idea of two distinct phonemes. However, the back [ɑ] is always maintained in Northern French, but only in final open syllables, avocat (lawyer) [ɑvoːkɑ], but in final closed syllables, the /ɑ/ phoneme is fronted to [aː], but it is always long, pâte (pasta) [paːt]. The distinction is still clearly maintained in many dialects such as Quebec French.

While there is much variation among speakers in France, a number of general tendencies can be observed. First of all, the distinction is most often preserved in word-final stressed syllables such as in these minimal pairs:

tache /taʃ/ → [taʃ] ('stain'), vs. tâche /tɑʃ/ → [tɑʃ] ('task')
patte /pat/ → [pat] ('leg'), vs. pâte /pɑt/ → [pɑt] ('paste, pastry')
rat /ʁa/ → [ʁa] ('rat'), vs. ras /ʁɑ/ → [ʁɑ] ('short')

There are certain environments that prefer one open vowel over the other. For example, /ɑ/ is preferred after /ʁw/ and before /z/:

trois [tʁwɑ] ('three'),
gaz [ɡɑz] ('gas').

The difference in quality is often reinforced by a difference in length (but the difference is contrastive in final closed syllables). The exact distribution of the two vowels varies greatly from speaker to speaker.

Back /ɑ/ is much rarer in unstressed syllables, but it can be encountered in some common words:

château [ʃɑ.to] ('castle'),
passé [pɑ.se] ('past').

Morphologically complex words derived from words containing stressed /ɑ/ do not retain it:

âgé /ɑʒe/ → [aː.ʒe] ('aged', from âge /ɑʒ/ → [ɑʒ])
rarissime /ʁaʁisim/ → [ʁaʁisim] ('very rare', from rare /ʁɑʁ/ → [ʁɑʁ]).

Even in the final syllable of a word, back /ɑ/ may become [a] if the word in question loses its stress within the extended phonological context:

J'ai été au bois /ʒe ete o bwɑ/ → [ʒe.e.te.o.bwɑ] ('I've been to the woods'),
J'ai été au bois de Vincennes /ʒe ete o bwɑ dəvɛ̃sɛn/ → [ʒe.e.te.o.bwad.vɛ̃.sɛn] ('I've been to the Vincennes woods').

=== Nasal vowels ===
The phonetic qualities of the back nasal vowels differ from those of the corresponding oral vowels. The contrasting factor that distinguishes /ɑ̃/ and /ɔ̃/ is the extra lip rounding of the latter according to some linguists, and tongue height according to others. Speakers who produce both /œ̃/ and /ɛ̃/ distinguish them mainly through increased lip rounding of the former, but many speakers use only the latter phoneme, especially most speakers in northern France such as Paris (but not farther north, in Belgium).

In some dialects, particularly that of Europe, there is an attested tendency for nasal vowels to shift in a counterclockwise direction: /ɛ̃/ tends to be more open and shifts toward the vowel space of /ɑ̃/ (realised also as [æ̃]), /ɑ̃/ rises and rounds to [ɔ̃] (realised also as [ɒ̃]) and /ɔ̃/ shifts to [õ] or [ũ]. Also, in some regions, there also is an opposite movement for /ɔ̃/ for which it becomes more open like [ɒ̃], resulting in a merger of Standard French /ɔ̃/ and /ɑ̃/ in this case. According to one source, the typical phonetic realization of the nasal vowels in Paris is [æ̃] for /ɛ̃/, [ɑ̃] for /ɑ̃/ and [õ̞] for /ɔ̃/.

In Quebec French, two of the vowels shift in a different direction: /ɔ̃/ → [õ], more or less as in Europe, but /ɛ̃/ → [ẽ] and /ɑ̃/ → [ã].

In the Provence and Occitanie regions, nasal vowels are often realized as oral vowels before a stop consonant, thus reviving the ⟨n⟩ otherwise lost in other accents: quarante /kaʁɑ̃t/ → [kaˈʁantə].

Contrary to the oral /ɔ/, there is no attested tendency for the nasal /ɔ̃/ to become central in any accent.

=== Schwa ===
When phonetically realised, schwa (/ə/), also called e caduc ('dropped e') and e muet ('mute e'), is a mid-central vowel with some rounding. Many authors consider its value to be [œ], while Geoff Lindsey suggests [ɵ]. Fagyal, Kibbee & Jenkins (2006) state, more specifically, that it merges with /ø/ before high vowels and glides:

netteté /nɛtəte/ → [nɛ.tø.te] ('clarity'),
atelier /atəlje/ → [a.tø.lje] ('workshop'),

in phrase-final stressed position:

dis-le ! /di lə/ → [di.ˈlø] ('say it'),

and that it merges with /œ/ elsewhere. However, some speakers make a clear distinction, and it exhibits special phonological behavior that warrants considering it a distinct phoneme. Furthermore, the merger occurs mainly in the French of France; in Quebec, /ø/ and /ə/ are still distinguished.

The main characteristic of French schwa is its "instability": the fact that under certain conditions it has no phonetic realization.

- That is usually the case when it follows a single consonant in a medial syllable:
  appeler /apəle/ → [ap.le] ('to call'),
- It is occasionally mute in word-final position:
  porte /pɔʁtə/ → [pɔʁt] ('door').
- Word-final schwas are optionally pronounced if preceded by two or more consonants and followed by a consonant-initial word:
  une porte fermée /yn(ə) pɔʁt(ə) fɛʁme/ → [yn.pɔʁ.t(ə).fɛʁ.me] ('a closed door').
- In the future and conditional forms of -er verbs, however, the schwa is sometimes deleted even after two consonants:
  tu garderais /ty ɡaʁdəʁɛ/ → [ty.ɡaʁ.d(ə.)ʁɛ] ('you would guard'),
  nous brusquerons [les choses] /nu bʁyskəʁɔ̃/ → [nu.bʁys.k(ə.)ʁɔ̃] ('we will precipitate [things]').
- On the other hand, it is pronounced word-internally when it follows more pronounced consonants that cannot be combined into a complex onset with the initial consonants of the next syllable:
  gredin /ɡʁədɛ̃/ → [ɡʁə.dɛ̃] ('scoundrel'),
  sept petits /sɛt pəti/ → [sɛt.pə.ti] ('seven little ones').

In French versification, word-final schwa is always elided before another vowel and at the ends of verses. It is pronounced before a following consonant-initial word. For example, une grande femme fut ici, [yn ɡʁɑ̃d fam fy.t‿i.si] in ordinary speech, would in verse be pronounced [y.nə ɡʁɑ̃.də fa.mə fy.t‿i.si], with the /ə/ enunciated at the end of each word.

Schwa cannot normally be realised as a front vowel ([œ]) in closed syllables. In such contexts in inflectional and derivational morphology, schwa usually alternates with the front vowel /ɛ/:

harceler /aʁsəle/ → [aʁ.sœ.le] ('to harass'), with
il harcèle /il aʁsɛl/ → [i.laʁ.sɛl] ('[he] harasses').

A three-way alternation can be observed, in a few cases, for a number of speakers:

appeler /apəle/ → [ap.le] ('to call'),
j'appelle /ʒ‿apɛl/ → [ʒa.pɛl] ('I call'),
appellation /apelasjɔ̃/ → [a.pe.la.sjɔ̃] ('brand'), which can also be pronounced [a.pɛ.la.sjɔ̃].

Cases of word-internal stable ⟨e⟩ are more subject to variation among speakers, but, for example, un rebelle /œ̃ ʁəbɛl/ ('a rebel') must be pronounced with a full vowel in contrast to un rebond /œ̃ ʁəbɔ̃/ → or [œ̃ʁ.bɔ̃] ('a bounce').

=== Length ===
Except for the distinction still made by some speakers between /ɛ/ and /ɛː/ in rare minimal pairs like mettre [mɛtʁ] ('to put') vs. maître [mɛːtʁ] ('teacher'), variation in vowel length is entirely allophonic. Vowels can be lengthened in closed, stressed syllables, under the following two conditions:

- /o/, /ø/, /ɑ/, and the nasal vowels are lengthened before any consonant: pâte [pɑːt] ('dough'), chante [ʃɑ̃ːt] ('sings').
- All vowels are lengthened if followed by one of the voiced fricatives—/v/, /z/, /ʒ/, /ʁ/ (not in combination with another consonant)—or by the cluster /vʁ/: mer/mère [mɛːʁ] ('sea/mother'), crise [kʁiːz] ('crisis'), livre [liːvʁ] ('book'). However, words such as (ils) servent [sɛʁv] ('(they) serve') or tarte [taʁt] ('pie') are pronounced with short vowels since the /ʁ/ appears in clusters other than /vʁ/.

When such syllables lose their stress, the lengthening effect may be absent. The vowel [o] of saute is long in Regarde comme elle saute !, in which the word is phrase-final and therefore stressed, but not in Qu'est-ce qu'elle saute bien ! In accents wherein /ɛː/ is distinguished from /ɛ/, however, it is still pronounced with a long vowel even in an unstressed position, as in fête in C'est une fête importante.

The following table presents the pronunciation of a representative sample of words in phrase-final (stressed) position:

Phoneme	Vowel value in closed syllable				Vowel value in open syllable	
Phoneme	Non-lengthening consonant		Lengthening consonant		Vowel value in open syllable	
/i/	habite	[a.bit]	livre	[liːvʁ]	habit	[a.bi]
/e/	—				été	[e.te]
/ɛ/	faites	[fɛt]	faire	[fɛːʁ]	fait	[fɛ]
/ɛː/	fête	[fɛːt]	rêve	[ʁɛːv]	—	
/ø/	jeûne	[ʒøːn]	joyeuse	[ʒwa.jøːz]	joyeux	[ʒwa.jø]
/œ/	jeune	[ʒœn]	œuvre	[œːvʁ]	—	
/o/	saute	[soːt]	rose	[ʁoːz]	saut	[so]
/ɔ/	sotte	[sɔt]	mort	[mɔːʁ]	—	
/ə/	—				le	[lə]
/y/	débute	[de.byt]	juge	[ʒyːʒ]	début	[de.by]
/u/	bourse	[buʁs]	bouse	[buːz]	bout	[bu]
/a/	rate	[ʁat]	rage	[ʁaːʒ]	rat	[ʁa]
/ɑ/	appâte	[a.pɑːt]	rase	[ʁɑːz]	appât	[a.pɑ]
/ɑ̃/	pende	[pɑ̃ːd]	genre	[ʒɑ̃ːʁ]	pends	[pɑ̃]
/ɔ̃/	réponse	[ʁe.pɔ̃ːs]	éponge	[e.pɔ̃ːʒ]	réponds	[ʁe.pɔ̃]
/œ̃/	emprunte	[ɑ̃.pʁœ̃ːt]	grunge	[ɡʁœ̃ːʒ]	emprunt	[ɑ̃.pʁœ̃]
/ɛ̃/	teinte	[tɛ̃ːt]	quinze	[kɛ̃ːz]	teint	[tɛ̃]

=== Devoicing ===
In Parisian French, the close vowels /i, y, u/ and the mid front /e, ɛ/ at the end of utterances can be devoiced. A devoiced vowel may be followed by a sound similar to the voiceless palatal fricative [ç]:

Merci. /mɛʁsi/ → [mɛʁ.si̥ç] ('Thank you.'),
Allez ! /ale/ → [a.le̥ç̠] ('Go!').

This phenomenon, interpreted variously as phrase-final vowel devoicing or phrase-final fricative epithesis, was first described by linguistic research in 1989 as the emergence of "sharp, phrase-final whistles". In informal writing on social media platforms, it can surface as a final -h or -ch. Sociolinguistic research suggests that it is observed across continental French, not just within Paris, and that it is correlated with intense emotion, and with a formal register for L2 speakers.

In Quebec French, close vowels are often devoiced when unstressed and surrounded by voiceless consonants:

université /ynivɛʁsite/ → [y.ni.vɛʁ.si̥.te] ('university').

Though a more prominent feature of Quebec French, phrase-medial devoicing is also found in European French.

=== Elision ===
The final vowel (usually /ə/) of a number of monosyllabic function words is elided in syntactic combinations with a following word that begins with a vowel. For example, compare the pronunciation of the unstressed subject pronoun, in je dors /ʒə dɔʁ/ [ʒə.dɔʁ] ('I am sleeping'), and in j'arrive /ʒ‿aʁiv/ [ʒa.ʁiv] ('I am arriving').

=== Glides and diphthongs ===
The glides [j], [w], and [ɥ] appear in syllable onsets immediately followed by a full vowel. In many cases, they alternate systematically with their vowel counterparts [i], [u], and [y] such as in the following pairs of verb forms:

- nie [ni]; nier [nje] ('deny')
- loue [lu]; louer [lwe] ('rent')
- tue [ty]; tuer [tɥe] ('kill')

The glides in the examples can be analyzed as the result of a glide formation process that turns an underlying high vowel into a glide when followed by another vowel: /nie/ → [nje].

This process is usually blocked after a complex onset of the form obstruent + liquid (a stop or a fricative followed by /l/ or /ʁ/). For example, while the pair loue/louer shows an alternation between [u] and [w], the same suffix added to cloue [klu], a word with a complex onset, does not trigger the glide formation: clouer [klu.e] ('to nail'). Some sequences of glide + vowel can be found after obstruent-liquid onsets, however. The main examples are [ɥi], as in pluie [plɥi] ('rain'), [wa], as in proie [pʁwa] ('prey'), and [wɛ̃], as in groin [ɡʁwɛ̃] ('snout'). They can be dealt with in different ways, as by adding appropriate contextual conditions to the glide formation rule or by assuming that the phonemic inventory of French includes underlying glides or rising diphthongs like /ɥi/ and /wa/.

Glide formation normally does not occur across morpheme boundaries in compounds like semi-aride ('semi-arid'). However, in colloquial registers, si elle [si.ɛl] ('if she') can be pronounced just like ciel [sjɛl] ('sky'), or tu as [ty.ɑ] ('you have') like tua [tɥa] ('[(s)he] killed').

The glide [j] can also occur in syllable coda position, after a vowel, as in soleil [sɔlɛj] ('sun'), and often after [n], since /ɲ/ tends to be realised as [nj], like in Allemagne ("Germany") [almanj], instead of [almaɲ]. There again, one can formulate a derivation from an underlying full vowel /i/, but the analysis is not always adequate because of the existence of possible minimal pairs like pays [pɛ.i] ('country') / paye [pɛj] ('paycheck') and abbaye [a.bɛ.i] ('abbey') / abeille [a.bɛj] ('bee'). Schane (1968) proposes an abstract analysis deriving postvocalic [j] from an underlying lateral by palatalization and glide conversion (/lj/ → /ʎ/ → /j/).

Vowel	Onset glide			Examples
Vowel	/j/	/ɥ/	/w/	Examples
/a/	/ja/	/ɥa/	/wa/	paillasse, Éluard, poire
/ɑ/	/jɑ/	/ɥɑ/	/wɑ/	acariâtre, tuas, jouas
/ɑ̃/	/jɑ̃/	/ɥɑ̃/	/wɑ̃/	vaillant, exténuant, Assouan
/e/	/je/	/ɥe/	/we/	janvier, muer, jouer
/ɛ/	/jɛ/	/ɥɛ/	/wɛ/	lierre, duel, mouette
/ɛ̃/	/jɛ̃/	/ɥɛ̃/	/wɛ̃/	bien, juin, soin
/i/	/ji/	/ɥi/	/wi/	yin, huile, ouïr
/o/	/jo/	/ɥo/	/wo/	Millau, duo, statuquo
/ɔ/	/jɔ/	/ɥɔ/	/wɔ/	Niort, quatuor, wok
/ɔ̃/	/jɔ̃/	/ɥɔ̃/	/wɔ̃/	lion, tuons, jouons
/ø/	/jø/	/ɥø/	—N/a	mieux, fructueux
/œ/	/jœ/	/ɥœ/	/wœ/	antérieur, sueur, loueur
/œ̃/	—N/a	—N/a	—N/a	
/u/	/ju/	—N/a	/wu/	caillou, Wuhan
/y/	/jy/	—N/a	—N/a	feuillu

== Stress ==
=== Nature of stress in French ===
There has been variety of opinions in literature on the nature of stress in French. Perspectives range from French having lexical stress falling on the final full syllable (syllable with a vowel other than schwa) of a word to French having no lexical stress at all. A more nuanced view holds that French has stress that falls on the final full syllable of what has been variously termed a "stress group", "tone unit" or "phonological phrase", which has been considered to consist of either a "stressable" (typically content) word and any associated clitics (meaning words containing a schwa as the only vowel, such as ce, de, le, que, etc., can also be stressed) or a group of words linked by syntactic or semantic properties (reminiscent of prosodic stress). The latter perspective, along with the noted tonal quality of French stress, has given rise to the view that French stress and intonation largely overlap with each other.

In any case, it has always been agreed that word stress is not distinctive in French, so two words cannot be distinguished based on stress placement alone. Additionally, vowels keep their full quality in all syllables, regardless of whether the rhythm of the speaker is syllable-timed or mora-timed. (Mora-timed speech is frequent in French, especially in Canada, where it is very much the norm due to its phonemic long vowels.)

=== Emphatic stress ===
Emphatic stress is used to call attention to a specific element in a given context, such as to express a contrast or to reinforce the emotive content of a word. In French, this stress falls on the first consonant-initial syllable of the word in question. The characteristics associated with emphatic stress include increased amplitude and pitch of the vowel and gemination of the onset consonant, as mentioned above.

- C'est parfaitement vrai. [sɛ.paʁ.fɛt.mɑ̃.ˈvʁɛ] ('It's perfectly true.'; no emphatic stress)
- C'est parfaitement vrai. [sɛ.ˈp(ː)aʁ.fɛt.mɑ̃.ˈvʁɛ] (emphatic stress on parfaitement)

For words that begin with a vowel, emphatic stress falls on the first syllable that begins with a consonant or on the initial syllable with the insertion of a glottal stop or a liaison consonant.

- C'est épouvantable. [sɛ.te.ˈp(ː)u.vɑ̃ˈ.tabl] ('It's terrible.'; emphatic stress on second syllable of épouvantable)
- C'est épouvantable ! [sɛ.ˈt(ː)e.pu.vɑ̃.ˈtabl] (initial syllable with liaison consonant [t])
- C'est épouvantable ! [sɛ.ˈʔe.pu.vɑ̃.ˈtabl] (initial syllable with glottal stop insertion)

Emphatic stress may be associated with a pause between each syllable of the stressed word, which adds to emphasis.

== Intonation ==
French intonation differs substantially from that of English. There are four primary patterns:

- The continuation pattern is a rise in pitch occurring in the last syllable of a rhythm group (typically a phrase).
- The finality pattern is a sharp fall in pitch occurring in the last syllable of a declarative statement.
- The yes/no intonation is a sharp rise in pitch occurring in the last syllable of a yes/no question.
- The information question intonation is a rapid fall-off from a high pitch on the first word of a non-yes/no question, often followed by a small rise in pitch on the last syllable of the question.

== See also ==
Sub-articles

- Quebec French phonology

Related

- Phonological history of French
- Phonologie du Français Contemporain
- Varieties of French – Many articles on varieties feature their own "Phonology" section
- History of French (especially § Internal phonological history)
- French orthography (especially § Spelling to sound correspondences)
- Reforms of French orthography

== Sources ==
- Adams, Douglas Q. (1975), "The Distribution of Retracted Sibilants in Medieval Europe", Language, 51 (2): 282–292, doi:10.2307/412855, JSTOR 412855
- Anderson, Stephen R. (1982), "The Analysis of French Shwa: Or, How to Get Something for Nothing", Language, 58 (3): 534–573, doi:10.2307/413848, JSTOR 413848
- Berns, Janine (2013), "Velar variation in French", Linguistics in the Netherlands, 30 (1): 13–27, doi:10.1075/avt.30.02ber
- Casagrande, Jean (1984), The Sound System of French, Washington, DC: Georgetown University Press, ISBN 978-0-87840-085-0
- Chitoran, Ioana; Hualde, José Ignacio (2007), "From hiatus to diphthong: the evolution of vowel sequences in Romance" (PDF), Phonology, 24: 37–75, doi:10.1017/S095267570700111X, S2CID 14947405
- Chitoran, Ioana (2002), "A perception-production study of Romanian diphthongs and glide-vowel sequences", Journal of the International Phonetic Association, 32 (2): 203–222, doi:10.1017/S0025100302001044, S2CID 10104718
- Collins, Beverley; Mees, Inger M. (2013) [First published 2003], Practical Phonetics and Phonology: A Resource Book for Students (3rd ed.), Routledge, ISBN 978-0-415-50650-2
- Dalola, Amanda; Bridwell, Keiko (2020), "Redefining Sociophonetic Competence: Mapping COG Differences in Phrase-Final Fricative Epithesis in L1 and L2 Speakers of French", Languages, 5 (4), Multidisciplinary Digital Publishing Institute (MDPI): 59, doi:10.3390/languages5040059
- Dalola, Amanda (2022), "#YouAreWhatYouTweetCHHH: Identity and fricative epithesis in French-language tweets", Journal of French Language Studies, 32 (2), Cambridge University Press: 243–266, doi:10.1017/S0959269522000047
- Detey, Sylvain; Durand, Jacques; Laks, Bernard; Lyche, Chantal, eds. (2016), Varieties of Spoken French, Oxford University Press, ISBN 978-0-19957371-4
- Fagyal, Zsuzsanna; Kibbee, Douglas; Jenkins, Fred (2006), French: A Linguistic Introduction, Cambridge: Cambridge University Press, ISBN 978-0-521-82144-5
- Fagyal, Zsuzsanna; Moisset, Christine (1999), "Sound Change and Articulatory Release: Where and Why are High Vowels Devoiced in Parisian French?" (PDF), Proceedings of the XIVth International Congress of Phonetic Science, San Francisco, vol. 1, pp. 309–312
- Fougeron, Cecile; Smith, Caroline L (1993), "Illustrations of the IPA:French", Journal of the International Phonetic Association, 23 (2): 73–76, doi:10.1017/S0025100300004874, S2CID 249404451
- Grevisse, Maurice; Goosse, André (2011), Le Bon usage (in French), Louvain-la-Neuve: De Boeck Duculot, ISBN 978-2-8011-1642-5
- Léon, P. (1992), Phonétisme et prononciations du français, Paris: Nathan
- Ladefoged, Peter; Maddieson, Ian (1996), The Sounds of the World's Languages, Oxford: Blackwell, ISBN 0-631-19815-6
- Lian, A-P (1980), Intonation Patterns of French (PDF), Melbourne: River Seine Publications, ISBN 978-0-909367-21-3
- Lodge, Ken (2009), A Critical Introduction to Phonetics, Continuum International Publishing Group, ISBN 978-0-8264-8873-2
- Morin, Yves-Charles (1986), "La loi de position ou de l'explication en phonologie historique" (PDF), Revue Québécoise de Linguistique, 15 (2): 199–231, doi:10.7202/602567ar
- Schane, Sanford A. (1968), French Phonology and Morphology, Cambridge, MA: M.I.T. Press, ISBN 978-0-262-19040-4
- Torreira, Francisco; Ernestus, Mirjam (2010), "Phrase-medial vowel devoicing in spontaneous French", Interspeech 2010, pp. 2006–2009, doi:10.21437/Interspeech.2010-568, hdl:11858/00-001M-0000-0012-C810-3, S2CID 14248950
- Tranel, Bernard (1987), The Sounds of French: An Introduction, Cambridge, New York: Cambridge University Press, ISBN 978-0-521-31510-4
- Trudgill, Peter (1974), "Linguistic change and diffusion: Description and explanation in sociolinguistic dialect", Language in Society, 3 (2): 215–246, doi:10.1017/S0047404500004358, S2CID 145148233
- Walker, Douglas (2001), French Sound Structure, University of Calgary Press, ISBN 978-1-55238-033-8
- Walker, Douglas (1984), The Pronunciation of Canadian French (PDF), Ottawa: University of Ottawa Press, ISBN 978-0-7766-4500-1
- Wells, J.C. (1989), "Computer-Coded Phonemic Notation of Individual Languages of the European Community", Journal of the International Phonetic Association, 19 (1): 31–54, doi:10.1017/S0025100300005892, S2CID 145148170
- Yaguello, Marina (1991), "Les géminées de M. Rocard", En écoutant parler la langue, Paris: Seuil, pp. 64–70
