= Richelieus Stellung in der Geschichte der französischen Litteratur =

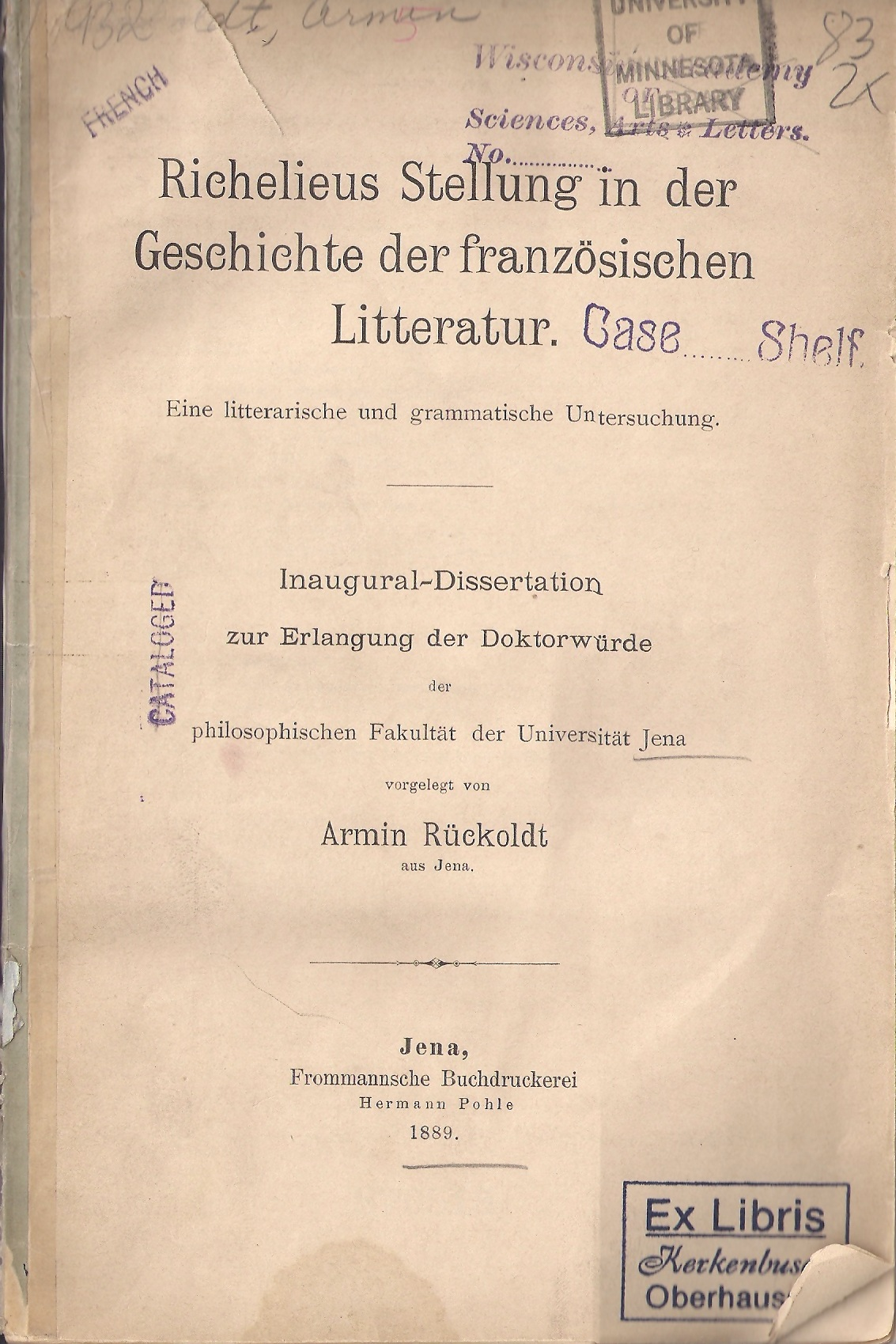
Original cover of the book, published in 1889.

Richelieus Stellung in der Geschichte der französischen Litteratur: eine litterarische und grammatische Untersuchung (Richelieu's role in the history of French literature: a grammatical and literary analysis) is a book published in 1889 by Armin Rückoldt, German academic, and published in the same year in Jena. Originally, the work was presented by Rückoldt as his inaugural dissertation at the faculty of philosophy of the Friedrich-Schiller University of Jena, with which he attained the grade of doctor.

The book analyzes the works by Cardinal Richelieu as a way to comprehend the evolution of French grammar between the 16th and 17th centuries. Despite the book's main emphasis on the language, it also provides a biography of Richelieu, a quick contextualization of the political and social situation of France during the studied years and a brief summary of each analyzed text.

== Contents ==
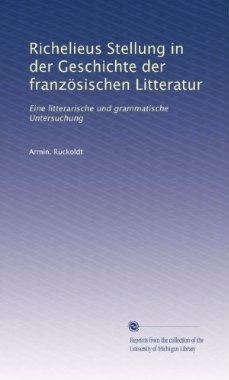
Modern edition of the book.

Introduction

The introduction is divided into two chapters: "Characteristics of the 16th and 17th centuries from the literary perspective" and "Notes on Richelieu’s life". The first chapter describes in general terms the changes in the literary scene between the 16th and 17th centuries in France, highlighting the characteristics of the schools of Clément Marot, Ronsard, Malherbes, Corneille, Balzac and Voltaire. The second chapter provides a quick biographic summary of Richelieu from his early years until his entrance in the courtly circles, his work as a writer and his political career.

Richelieu's works, analyzed literarily

In this chapter, Rückoldt describes the circumstances under which Richelieu wrote the following works and provide a summary of all of them: Ordonnances sinodales, Harangue of 1615, Les quatre points principaux de la foy de l’Englise, Instruction du Chrestien, Harangue a la Reine of 1620, a letter to the bishop Du Bellay, Richelieu's letters published by Avendel, Perfection du Chrestien, memoires, diary, a manuscript on the Italian wars, and Testament politique.

Richelieu's works, analyzed grammatically

This section focuses on the study of the before-mentioned texts from a grammatical perspective. Rückoldt analyzes Richelieu's texts and compares his grammar with that of other French writers of his period (sometimes, even somewhat previous) and with the conclusions held by A. Haase in his work "The syntaxis of the French language in the 17th century". This way, Rückoldt isolates many particularities of Richelieu's way of writing and contrasts them with the predominant form of writing of his time to describe the grammatical and syntactical changes of French during the 16th and 17th centuries. This part is divided in two chapters: "According to the syntax" (which is in turn divided in the following sub-chapters: the pronoun, the numeral and the indefinite article, the verb, the adverb, the prepositions, the conjunctions, parts of the sentence and coordinated sentences, the word order). The other chapter is "According to the construction of phrases".

Conclusion

Rückoldt concludes that the language used by Richelieu is very advanced in comparison to that of his contemporaries and that it presents fewer differences in relation to modern French than most of the writers of his time. He says that "he exceeds Pascal, Descartes, Corneille, Racine, etc. in the correct use of the idiom and equals them in the clearness of his expression". He highlights Richelieu's language as being proper of the courts and, therefore, free from provincialism and other vulgar expressions. Even more, he considers it "the precedent of the classical French literature prose. Finally, Rückoldt mentions that, due to the popularity of Richelieu's works, he must have contributed indirectly to the faster assimilation of the grammatical and syntactical changes of the language of his time during the transition from the 16th to the 17th century and says that, because of this, Richelieu's works are worthy of being studied today, not only from a philosophical and theological perspective, but also philologically.

== Edition ==
- Rückoldt, Armin: Richelieus Stellung in der Geschichte der französischen Litteratur. Jena, Frommannsche Buchdruckerei, Hermann Pohle, 1889. 66 Pgs.

== See also ==
- Englische Schulredensarten für den Sprachenunterricht
