= French conjunctions =

Part of speech

French conjunctions are words that connect words, phrases, or clauses in the French language. They are used to create more complex sentences and to show the relationships between ideas. French conjunctions can be divided into two main categories: coordinating and subordinating conjunctions.

== Coordinating conjunctions ==
Coordinating conjunctions are used to join words, phrases, or independent clauses of equal grammatical importance. There are seven main coordinating conjunctions in French: et (and), ou (or), mais (but), ni... ni (neither... nor), or (yet, however), car (for, because), donc (so, therefore).

== Subordinating conjunctions ==
Subordinating conjunctions are used to join a dependent or subordinate clause to an independent or main clause. They indicate the relationship between the clauses, such as time, cause, condition, or concession. Some common subordinating conjunctions in French include the subordinators que (that) and si (if), along with relative words such as quand (when), and prepositions such as puisque (since, as), parce que (because), comme (as, since), bien que (although, even though), avant que (before), après que (after), pendant que (while).

== Conjunctional phrases ==
Conjunctional phrases are groups of words that function as conjunctions. They can be used to connect clauses or phrases and express relationships such as cause, condition, or concession. Some common conjunctional phrases in French include: afin que (so that) à condition que (provided that) à moins que (unless), au cas où (in case), en dépit de (despite), pour que (so that, in order that), tant que (as long as).

== See also ==
- French grammar
