= PFC =

PFC may refer to:

== Science and technology ==
- Perfluorinated compound, organofluorine compounds with hydrogen replaced by fluorine and other heteroatoms
- Perfluorocarbons, hydrocarbon derivatives containing only carbon and fluorine atoms
  - Blood substitute, some of which are made of perfluorocarbons
- Plasma-facing components, in a fusion reactor
- Prefrontal cortex, the anterior part of the frontal lobes of the brain
- Phonologie du Français Contemporain, French phonology research project
- Physiological functional capacity, the ability to perform the physical tasks of daily life

=== Technology ===
- Parallel flange channel, a type of steel beam
- Phase-fired controller, to control AC power
- Power factor correction, of electric loads
- Power foundation classes, computer libraries for PowerBuilder
- Priority flow control, Ethernet technology

== Organizations ==
- Power Finance Corporation, an Indian financial institution
- PFC Energy, a global energy research and consultancy group
- Pacific Fur Company, a former fur trading venture
- Playing for Change, a multimedia music project
- Progress and Future of Ceuta, a former political party

== Sports ==
=== Association football clubs ===
- Paris FC, France
- Paulínia FC, São Paulo, Brazil
- Persepolis F.C., Tehran, Iran
- PFC Beroe Stara Zagora, Bulgaria
- Portadown F.C., Northern Ireland
- Portstewart F.C., Northern Ireland
- Port F.C., Thailand
- Portsmouth F.C., England
- Pacific FC, Vancouver Island, Canada
- FK Partizan, Belgrade, Serbia

=== Other sports ===
- Pillow Fight Championship, US professional sports organization
- Palace Fighting Championship, former US martial arts organization
- Pure Fusion Collective, a women’s stable in professional wrestling organization WWE

== Other uses ==
- Passenger facility charge, a tax on air travelers
- Pacific City State Airport (IATA airport code), near Pacific City, Oregon, US
- Price forward curve, a method to determine the forecasted price of a commodity
- Private first class, a junior military rank
