= Conseil international de la langue française =

The Conseil international de la langue française (International Council for the French Language) is an association formed in 1968 in Paris whose mission is to enrich the French language and to encourage its influence.

Its work involves producing linguistic tools for French-speaking countries and to support relations with other language. It publishes multilingual dictionaries, in print and electronic media, and maintains a computerised database of terminology along with a database of spelling and grammar, available online through the Orthonet service.

The Council also publishes educational materials for French-speaking people and participates in projects on oral traditions and the interaction of languages and cultures. It also publishes the periodicals La banque des mots and Le français moderne.

André Goosse is the president with Hubert Joly as the secretary general. The advisors include Henriette Walter, Jacqueline Picoche, André Jaumotte, Charles Muller, Bernard Pottier, Willy Bal, Marc Wilmet, and Jean-Marie Klinkenberg.
