= Englische Schulredensarten für den Sprachenunterricht =

1909 book by Armin Rückoldt

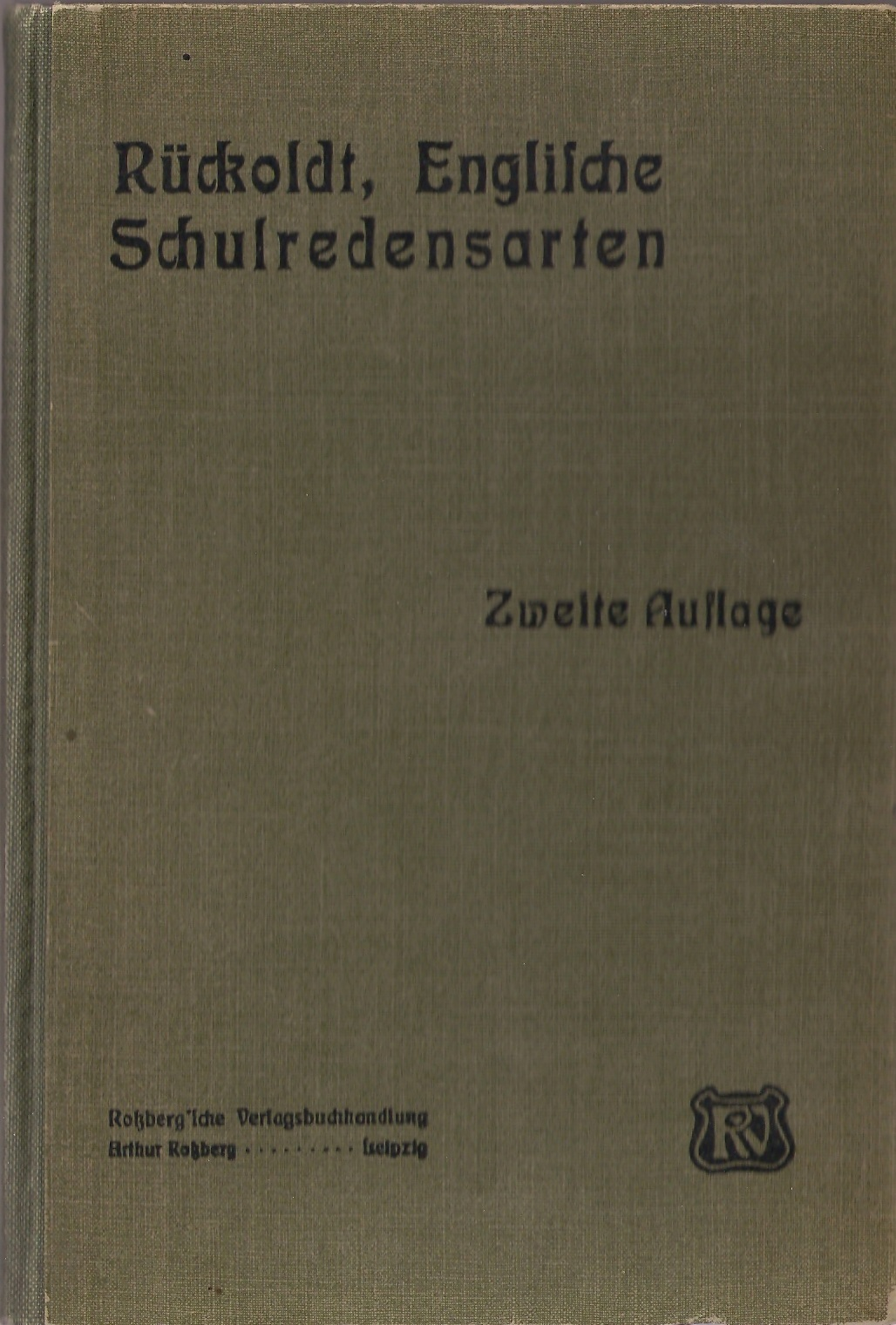
Front cover of the book's second edition.

Englische Schulredensarten für den Sprachenunterricht (English locutions for the teaching of languages) is a book by German scholar Armin Rückoldt, published in Leipzig in 1900. The book consists of 1027 commonly used phrases in schools in both English and German. According to the author, the phrases are not meant to be memorized, textually quoted or asked in interrogations, but rather to be employed naturally and dynamically, adapting to the different situations and conditions; and thus the command of the language is to be attained fluidly.

== Contents ==
The book begins with a preface which includes the prologues to the 2 editions of the book, both written by Armin Rückoldt, in which he explains the changes between the two editions (basically minor, modernizing corrections and the elimination of some unimportant phrases) and the objective and correct use of the book.

The book consists of phrases for different situations, grouped in the following chapters (since the titles have been copied literally, the grammar and orthography, in both English and German, may differ from modern usage):

- Verhalten der Schüler während der Pause und vor dem Beginne des Unterrichtes / Conduct of pupils during recreation and before the classes begin - 1-34.

- Ordnung im Schulzimmer / Order in the school-room - 35-85.

- Luft und Licht im Schulzimmer / Air and light in the school-room - 86-141.

- Abwesenheit von Schülern / Absence of pupils - 142-179.

- Zuspätkommen von Schülern / Coming late (Unpunctuality) - 180-213.

- Äußeres der Schüler / Appearance (Look) of pupils - 214-243.

- Körperhaltung der Schüler / Deportment of pupils - 244-277.

- Sachen der Schüler / The pupils' things - 278-390.

- Schriftliche Hausaufgabe / Written home-work - 391-540.

- Schriftliche Klassenarbeit / Written class-work - 541-643.

- Mündliche Aufgaben / Oral tasks - 644-769.

- Schulzucht / Discipline - 770-894.

- Verlassen des Klassenzimmers / Leaving the class-room - 895-905.

- Versetzung und Nichtversetzung / Advancement and remaining in the same class - 906-912.

- Abgang von der Schule / Leaving the school - 913-920.

- Aufnahme in die Schule / Admission the school - 921-955.

- Unterrichtszeit, Ferien, freie Stunden / Lesson-time, holidays, intervals - 956-980.

- Gespräche zwischen Schülern / Conversations between pupils - 981-1027.

== Editions ==
- Rückoldt, Armin: Englische Schulredensarten für den Sprachunterricht. 2. Edition. Leipzig, Roßberg'sche Verlagsbuchhandlung, 1909. 80 Pgs.

== See also ==
- Richelieus Stellung in der Geschichte der französischen Litteratur
