= Phonologie du Français Contemporain =

Phonologie du Français Contemporain (PFC) is an international linguistics research project devoted to the creation and use of resources for the study of the phonology of contemporary French.

== Activities ==
The main objective of the PFC project is the creation of a large, machine-readable, publicly available annotated corpus of contemporary spoken French, including data from as many francophone regions as possible. The database currently contains data from 450 speakers representing 75 geographical areas. Each speaker is recorded in various speech situations (reading aloud a word list and a text, guided conversation, spontaneous conversation). The data made available in the PFC corpus includes demographic information about each speaker, the sound files, an orthographic transcription, and several types of annotation. In particular, special encodings are used to indicate speakers' pronunciation of schwa and liaison.

The corpus is meant to be a resource for linguistic research into French phonology and a source for the development of tools for teaching French as a foreign language. The project also plays an important cultural role in the documentation of endangered regional varieties of French.

== Participating institutions ==
Researchers from the following institutions have contributed to the development of the PFC database.

- Laboratoire d'informatique pour la mécanique et les sciences de l'ingénieur
- Paris X University Nanterre
- Radboud University Nijmegen
- Université catholique de Louvain
- Stendhal University (Grenoble III)
- University of Oslo
- University of Osnabrück
- University of Provence Aix-Marseille I
- University of Toulouse
- University of Tromsø
- University of Mons
- University of Geneva
- University of Lausanne

Research on French phonology using the PFC resources and tools is carried out at many other sites.

== See also ==
- French phonology
