= Le Bon Usage =

French grammar book

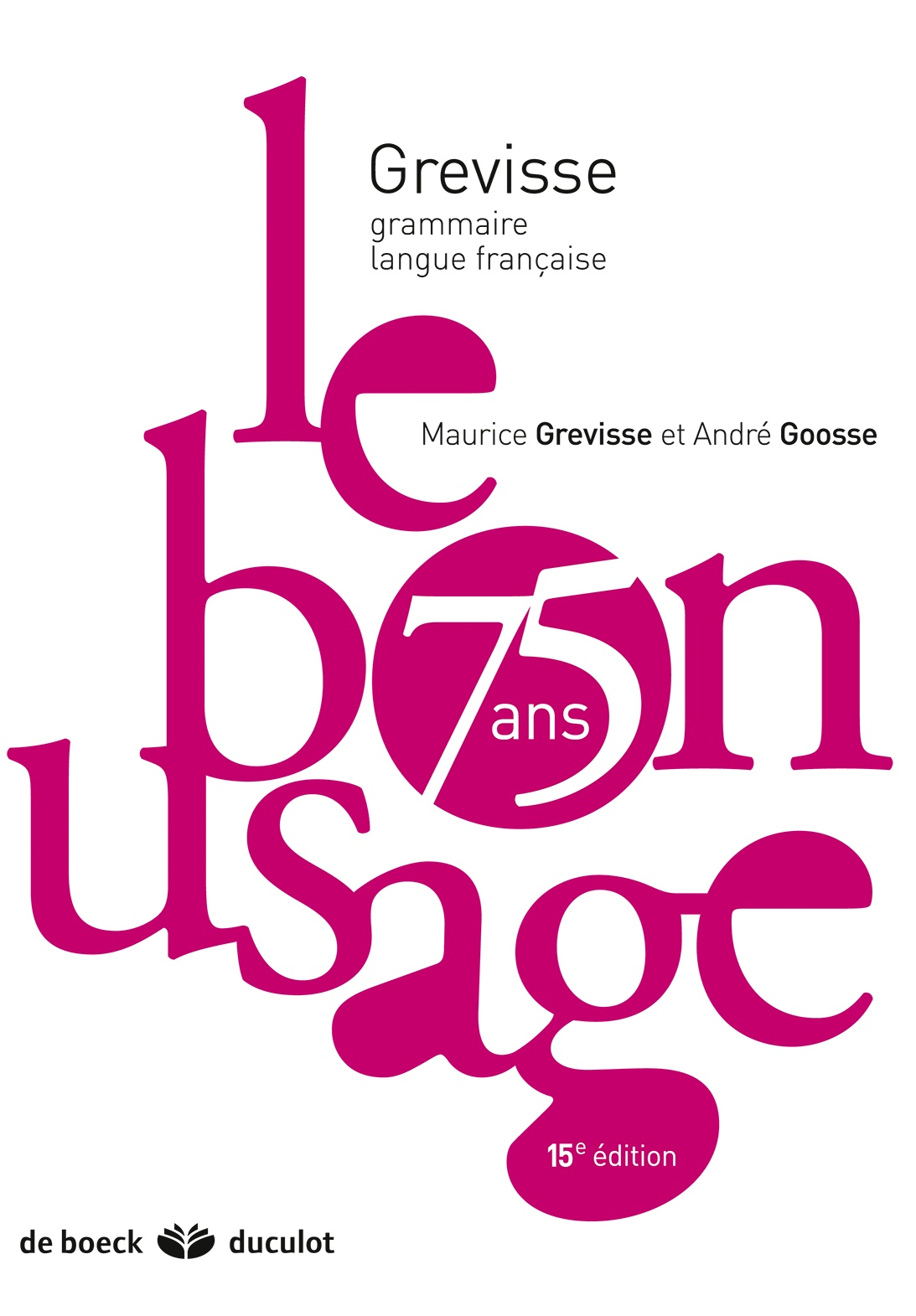
- 15th edition (2011)
- Author: Maurice Grevisse
- Language: French
- Subject: French grammar
- Genre: Reference work
- Publisher: Duculot / De Boeck Supérieur
- Publication date: 1936
- Publication place: Belgium
- Pages: 1,760 (16th ed.)

Le Bon Usage (French pronunciation: [lə bɔn‿yzaʒ], Correct Usage), informally called Le Grevisse, is a descriptive grammar of French first published in 1936 by Maurice Grevisse, and periodically revised since. It describes the usage of the French language, primarily in its written literary form.

== Description ==
Quite extensive (1,760 pages in the 16th edition), it includes numerous examples and counter-examples (40,000 citations) taken from Francophone literature of various periods, including newspapers, forming a reference for teachers of French, and in particular, authors, translators, and editors.

== Editions ==
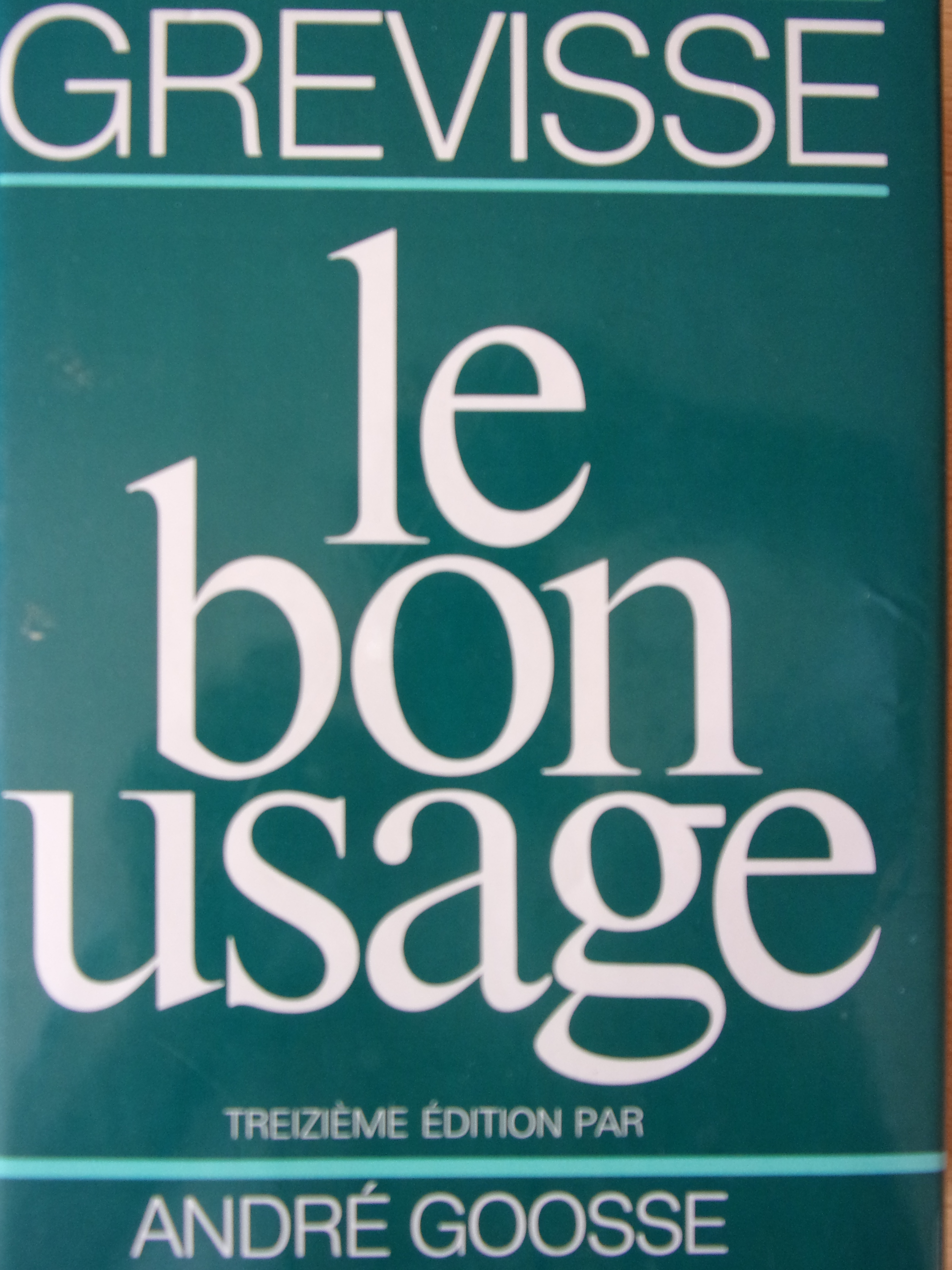
13th edition (1993)

In 1936, the first edition was published by Duculot (later De Boeck Supérieur). A new edition was published in 1939, and another in 1946. In 1946, the book was awarded the gold medal of the Académie française. The high praise of André Gide in the literary supplement of Le Figaro in February 1947 contributed to its success. In 1980, Bernard Pivot dedicated an episode of Apostrophes to the book following Grevisse's death.

After Grevisse's death in 1980, his son-in-law André Goosse, also a grammarian, took over and published the 12th and 13th (1993) editions. The 14th edition was published in August 2007 in a new format. The 15th edition appeared in 2011. The 16th edition was published in 2016 to mark the 80th anniversary of the book.

=== Online ===
As of 1 January 2023, Le Bon Usage is no longer available online.

== See also ==
- French grammar
