= André Goosse =

Belgian grammarian (1926–2019)

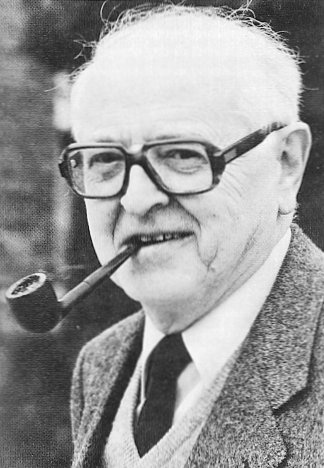
André Goosse

André Goosse (16 April 1926, Liège – 4 August 2019) was a Belgian grammarian. The son-in-law of Maurice Grevisse, he took over editing and updating Grevisse's last book, Le Bon Usage. In 1988, he married the Belgian writer France Bastia. Professor at the Université Catholique de Louvain, he was also the president of the Conseil international de la langue française.

His earliest research was carried out on the work of the 14th century writer from Liège, Jean d'Outremeuse. His work, carried out under the direction of Omer Jodogne, turned into a thesis which he defended in 1959, which was published in 1965.

Notable among his publications is a work exposing and commenting on the Les rectifications de l'orthographe ("corrections to orthography"), which was a report published on 6 December 1990 in the Journal officiel de la République française. Goosse's book, trying to make the debate less personal, was titled La « nouvelle » orthographe, Exposé et commentaires, published by Ed.Duculot in 1991. ISBN 2-8011-0976-2. The topic, according to Goosse, was less of a "reform" than of "developments" aimed at eliminating certain "anomalies and absurdities" as well as "contradictions existing among dictionaries".

Also noteworthy is Une langue, une communauté. Le français en Belgique, published in 1997 with Daniel Blampain, Jean-Marie Klinkenberg, Marc Wilmet ("One language, one community. French in Belgium").

In November 2007, Goosse was the editor, at De Boeck, of the 14th edition of Le Bon Usage. This edition was a complete rewrite. "This time", he told Belgian newspaper Le Soir, "it's like 2,000 pieces of a puzzle have been thrown into the air. Then, we had to rebuild."

André Goosse was the secretary of the Académie de Langue et de Littérature françaises de Belgique (Royal Academy of French Language and Literature in Belgium) from 1996 until 2001.

Goosse died on 4 August 2019, at the age of 93.
