= Henriette Walter =

French linguist

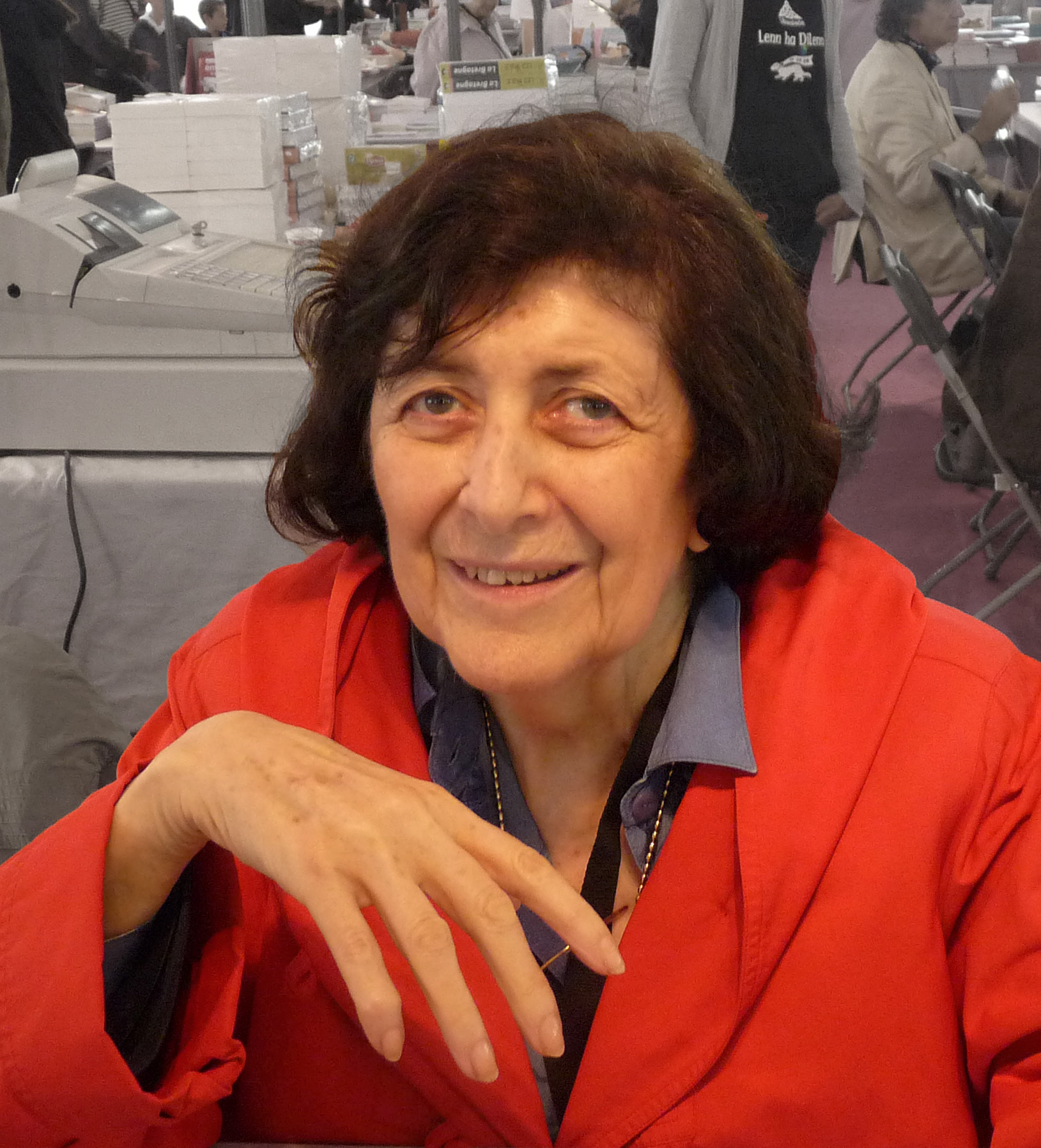
- Professor Walter in Vannes, Brittany, 2012
- Education: University of Paris
- Known for: Phonology, popular publications on French
- Scientific career
- Fields: Linguistics

Henriette Walter (b. Henriette Saada, 5 March 1929 in Sfax, Tunisia) is a French linguist, emeritus professor of French at the University of Rennes 2, and director of the Phonology Laboratory at the École pratique des hautes études at the Sorbonne. She is known for both her specialized academic work and her popular linguistics publications.

== Biography ==
Henriette Saada was born in Tunisia to a French mother and an Italian father. She learned to handle multiple languages at an early age: at home she spoke Italian, at school she spoke French, and in the streets she heard Arabic and Maltese spoken. A sufferer of serious myopia, she responded by training her hearing. She is quoted as saying: "As a little girl, I liked the idea that an object could have multiple names, that emotions could be expressed in different ways." She was able to convince her parents to let her go to study English at the Sorbonne, where she performed brilliantly in the International Phonetic Association examination.

She married Gérard Walter, who worked with her on multiple publications and with whom she had two children, Isabelle and Éric.

A decisive event in her life was meeting the linguist André Martinet. She became his closest collaborator and organized a workshop at the École pratique des hautes études from 1966 onwards.

== Research and popularization ==
Henriette Walter is known for her work in phonology. She is a fluent speaker of six languages and has worked with dozens of others.

== Selected publications ==
- Walter, Henriette. 1976. La dynamique des phonèmes dans le lexique français contemporain (Phonemic dynamics in the contemporary French lexicon). Paris: France Expansion.
- Walter, Henriette. 1977. La phonologie du français (The phonology of French). Paris: Presses Universitaires de France.
- Walter, Henriette. 1983. La nasale vélaire /ŋ/: un phonème du français? (The velar nasal /ŋ/: a French phoneme?) Langue Française 60, 14–29.
- Walter, Henriette. 1988. Le Français dans tous les sens. Paris: Laffont. Translated as French Inside Out by Peter Fawcett, 1994. London: Routledge. ISBN 9781134902057
- Walter, Henriette. 1994. L'aventure des langues en Occident: Leur origine, leur histoire, leur géographie (The adventure of the languages of the west: origins, history, geography). Paris: Laffont. ISBN 9782221059180
- Walter, Henriette. 1997. L'aventure des mots français venus d'ailleurs (The adventure of French words with foreign origins). Paris: Laffont. ISBN 9782221140505
- Walter, Henriette. 1998. Le Français d'ici, de là, de là-bas (French here, there and everywhere). Paris: Laffès. ISBN 9782709616508
- Walter, Henriette. 2001. Honni soit qui mal y pense: L'incroyable histoire d'amour entre le français et l’anglais (The incredible love story of French and English). Paris: Laffont. ISBN 9782221081655
- Walter, Henriette, Avenas, Pierre. 2007. La mystérieuse histoire du nom des oiseaux. (The mysterious history of bird names.). Paris: Laffont. ISBN 9782221108352
- Walter, Henriette. 2020. Les Petits plats dans les grands: La savoureuse histoire des mots de la cuisine et de la table. Paris: Laffont ISBN 9782221221419
