= Marc Wilmet =

Belgian linguist and professor (1938–2018)

- Born: August 28, 1938; Charleroi, Belgium
- Died: November 10, 2018 (aged 80); Ixelles, Belgium
- Occupations: Linguist, professor
- Employer(s): Université libre de Bruxelles; Vrije Universiteit Brussel
- Known for: Francqui Prize (1986)
- Title: Professor emeritus

Marc Wilmet (28 August 1938 – 10 November 2018) was a Belgian linguist and professor at the Université libre de Bruxelles (ULB). In 1986, he was awarded the Francqui Prize on Human Sciences.

== Biography ==
Marc Wilmet was born in Charleroi and spent his early years in various locations across Wallonia due to his father's assignments as a gendarme. He later attended school in Koekelberg. He obtained a licentiate degree in Romance philology in 1960 and a doctorate in Philosophy and Letters in 1968, both from the ULB.

He began his teaching career at the Athénée royal in Woluwe-Saint-Lambert, where he taught French. He later held academic positions in general and French linguistics at both the Vrije Universiteit Brussel (VUB), from 1970 to 2003, and the Université Libre de Bruxelles, from 1976 to 2003. In addition to his work in Belgium, he lectured at several international institutions, including universities in Kinshasa, Sherbrooke, Jerusalem, Nice, Cologne, Santiago de Compostela, Milan, and Bologna. He held the title of professor emeritus at both ULB and VUB.

Wilmet died in Ixelles on 10 November 2018.

== Selected works ==
- A Short History of French Spelling (Petite histoire de l’orthographe française), Académie royale de Belgique, 2015, ISBN 978-2-8031-0454-3
- Critical Grammar of French (Grammaire critique du français), Éditions Duculot, 2007, ISBN 978-2-8011-1403-2
- The Past Participle Differently: Agreement Protocol, Exercises and Answer Key (Le participe passé autrement : protocole d'accord, exercices et corrigés), Éditions Duculot, 1999, ISBN 978-2-8011-1256-4
- Georges Brassens the Libertarian: The Treble and the Drone (Georges Brassens libertaire: la chanterelle et le bourdon), Aden Belgique, 1991, ISBN 978-2-8059-0060-0
- Gustave Guillaume and His Linguistic School (Gustave Guillaume et son école linguistique), Éditions Labor, 1973, ISBN 978-2-8259-0086-4
- The Indicative System in Middle French: A Study of the "Drawers" of the Indicative in 15th- and 16th-Century French Farces, Sotties, and Moralities (Le système de l'indicatif en moyen français : Étude des “tiroirs” de l'indicatif dans les farces, sotties et moralités françaises des XVe et XVIe siècles), Éditions Droz, 1970, ISBN 978-2-600-02811-0

== See also ==
- Conseil international de la langue française
