= French subordinators =

Subordinators in the French language

French subordinators (also known as subordonnants or conjonctions de subordination) are words that primarily indicate that the clauses they introduce are subordinate to the main clause. In French, subordinators form a distinct lexical category and include words such as que (that) and si (whether/if).

Syntactically, these subordinators typically precede the subordinate clause. Semantically, they are primarily functional, serving to connect the subordinate clause to the main clause without adding significant meaning themselves.

== Terminology and membership ==
In French linguistics, the term subordonnant is commonly used to include, along with subordinators, relative pronouns, and prepositions. This article deals only with subordinators.

== Membership ==
Key French subordinators include:

- Que ("that"): Used in a variety of subordinate clauses, such as indirect speech and object clauses.
- Si ("whether"/"if"): Introduces interrogative subordinate clauses.

=== Examples ===
Each subordinator can be illustrated with examples:

- Que: Je pense que tu as raison. ("I think that you are right.")
- Si: Je me demande si c'est vrai. ("I wonder if it's right.")

== Subordinators vs other categories ==
Like English, French distinguishes subordinators from other grammatical categories such as prepositions and adverbs. A major difference is that the subordinators are semantically empty, while other words – such as comme ("like"), lorsque ("when"), puisque ("since") – that have been loosely described as conjonctions de subordination have particular meanings. (Note: Rather than "subordinator", Jones uses the term "complementiser".)

== Que/qui alternation ==
Que/qui alternation (French: alternance que/qui), or masquerade, is a syntactic phenomenon whereby the complementizer que is used to introduce subordinate clauses which contain a grammatical subject, while the form qui is used where the subject position is vacant.
