= Maurice Grevisse =

Belgian grammarian (1895–1980)

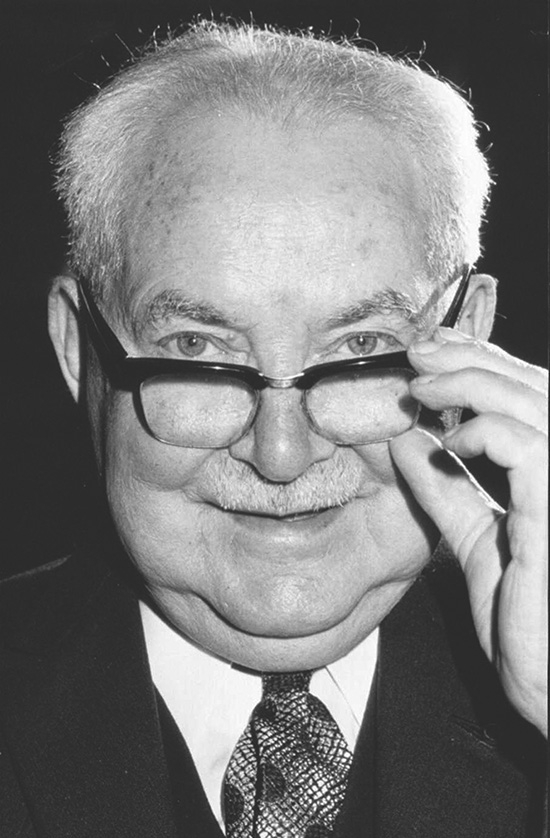
- Born: 7 October 1895; Rulles, Belgium
- Died: 4 July 1980 (aged 84); La Louvière, Belgium
- Occupation: French language grammarian

Maurice Grevisse (French: [mɔʁis ɡʁevis]; 7 October 1895 – 4 July 1980) was a Belgian grammarian.

== Biography ==
Born in Rulles, a small village in the province of Luxembourg, Belgium, Grevisse at a young age broke with a family tradition of working as blacksmiths by deciding to become a school teacher. He attended the Normal School of Carlsbourg, where he received his diploma as a primary school teacher in 1915. He then entered the Normal School of Malonne and graduated as a secondary school teacher of French literature. He received a position as a teacher of French at l'École des Pupilles of the army in Marneffe. During this period, he taught himself Latin and Greek. While continuing to proceed in his career, he read classical philology at the University of Liège. In 1925, he received the title of Doctor of Classical Philology. In 1927, he became a professor at l'École Royale des Cadets in Namur.

As a schoolteacher turned professor, Grevisse realized that existing grammar guides did not answer the needs of his teaching. He gathered his notes together to produce a manuscript he called Le Bon Usage.

Many renowned publishers refused his manuscript; eventually a modest publisher from Gembloux, Belgium published it in 1936. The publishing house Duculot was launched, and the success of the work never flagged, even during the war. André Gide, writing in Le Figaro, cited Le Bon Usage as the best French-language grammar guide in existence.

Grevisse was named an officer of the Legion of Honour in 1971. From 1967 to his death, he held a seat on the International Council for the French Language. After his death, his son-in-law André Goosse, born in 1926 and also a grammarian, continued to revise Le Bon Usage, which is currently in its 16th edition.

Grevisse died in La Louvière, Hainaut, Belgium.

== Bibliography ==
- Le Bon Usage : the first edition dates to 1936. Eleven editions were published during the life of Grevisse and with his signature. The 11th edition dates to 1980. The tradition of constant revision, so central to Le Bon Usage, has been continued by the current editor, André Goosse – son-in-law of Maurice Grevisse – who has acted in this capacity from the 12th edition (1991) onwards. Le Bon Usage is currently (2018) in its 16th edition.

Besides Le Bon Usage, Grevisse published several school and reference books dealing with difficulties in French:

- Précis de grammaire française (1939)
- Cours de dictées
- Le Français correct (1973)
- Savoir accorder le participe passé (1975)
- Quelle préposition ? (1977)
