= Archaic Greek alphabets =

Local variants of the ancient Greek alphabet

Many local variants of the Greek alphabet were employed in ancient Greece during the archaic and early classical periods, until around 400 BC, when they were replaced by the classical 24-letter alphabet that is the standard today. All forms of the Greek alphabet were originally based on the shared inventory of the 22 symbols of the Phoenician alphabet, with the exception of the letter Samekh, whose Greek counterpart Xi (Ξ) was used only in a subgroup of Greek alphabets, and with the common addition of Upsilon (Υ) for the vowel /u, ū/. The local, so-called epichoric, alphabets differed in many ways: in the use of the consonant symbols Χ, Φ and Ψ; in the use of the innovative long vowel letters (Ω and Η), in the absence or presence of Η in its original consonant function (/h/); in the use or non-use of certain archaic letters (Ϝ = /w/, Ϙ = /k/, Ϻ = /s/); and in many details of the individual shapes of each letter. The system now familiar as the standard 24-letter Greek alphabet was originally the regional variant of the Ionian cities in Anatolia. It was officially adopted in Athens in 403 BC and in most of the rest of the Greek world by the middle of the 4th century BC.

== Aspirate and consonant cluster symbols ==
A basic division into four major types of epichoric alphabets is commonly made according to their different treatment of additional consonant letters for the aspirated consonants (/pʰ, kʰ/) and consonant clusters (/ks, ps/) of Greek. These four types are often conventionally labelled as "green", "red", "light blue" and "dark blue" types, based on a colour-coded map in a seminal 19th-century work on the topic, Studien zur Geschichte des griechischen Alphabets by Adolf Kirchhoff (1867). The "green" (or southern) type is the most archaic and closest to the Phoenician. The "red" (or western) type is the one that was later transmitted to the West and became the ancestor of the Latin alphabet, and bears some crucial features characteristic of that later development. The "blue" (or eastern) type is the one from which the later standard Greek alphabet emerged.

The "green" (southern) type uses no additional letters beyond the Phoenician set, and typically also goes without Ξ (/ks/). Thus, the aspirated plosives /pʰ/, /kʰ/ are spelled either simply as Π and Κ respectively, without a distinction from unaspirated /p/, /k/, or as digraphs ΠΗ, ΚΗ. (However, for the analogous /tʰ/ there is already a dedicated letter, Θ, taken from Phoenician.) Likewise, the clusters /ps/, /ks/ are simply spelled ΠΣ, ΚΣ. This is the system found in Crete and in some other islands in the southern Aegean, notably Thera (Santorini), Melos and Anaphe.

The "red" (western) type also lacks Phoenician-derived Ξ for /ks/, but instead introduces a supplementary sign for that sound combination at the end of the alphabet, Χ. In addition, the red alphabet also introduced letters for the aspirates, Φ = /pʰ/ and Ψ = /kʰ/. Note that the use of Χ in the "red" set corresponds to the letter "X" in Latin, while it differs from the later standard Greek alphabet, where Χ stands for /kʰ/, and Ψ stands for /ps/. Only Φ for /pʰ/ is common to all non-green alphabets. The red type is found in most parts of central mainland Greece (Thessaly, Boeotia and most of the Peloponnese), as well as the island of Euboea, and in colonies associated with these places, including most colonies in Italy.

Phoenician model																														
Southern	"green"									—							—								*	—	—	—	—	—
Western	"red"									—							—								*				—	—
Eastern	"light blue"									—							—								*	—			—	—
Eastern	"dark blue"									—															*	—				—
Classic Ionian							—		—											—	—				*	—				
Modern alphabet		Α	Β	Γ	Δ	Ε	—	Ζ	—	Η	Θ	Ι	Κ	Λ	Μ	Ν	Ξ	Ο	Π	—	—	Ρ	Σ	Τ	Υ	—	Φ	Χ	Ψ	Ω
Sound in Ancient Greek		a	b	g	d	e	w	zd	h	ɛː	tʰ	i	k	l	m	n	ks	o	p	s	k	r	s	t	u	ks	pʰ	kʰ	ps	ɔː

*Upsilon is also derived from waw.

Distribution of "green", "red" and "blue" alphabet types, after Kirchhoff.

The "light blue" type still lacks Ξ (/ks/), and adds only letters for /pʰ/ (Φ) and /kʰ/ (Χ). Both of these correspond to the modern standard alphabet. The light blue system thus still has no separate letters for the clusters /ps/, /ks/. In this system, these are typically spelled ΦΣ and ΧΣ, respectively. This is the system found in Athens (before 403 BC) and several Aegean islands.

The "dark blue" type, finally, is the one that has all the consonant symbols of the modern standard alphabet: in addition to Φ and Χ (shared with the light blue type), it also adds Ψ (at the end of the alphabet), and Ξ (in the alphabetic position of Phoenician Samekh). This system is found in the cities of the Ionian dodecapolis, Knidos in Asia Minor, and in Corinth and Argos on the northeastern Peloponnese.

== Eta and /h/ ==
The letter eta (Η,, originally called hēta) had two different functions, both derived from the name of its Phoenician model, hēth: the majority of Greek dialects continued to use it for the consonant /h/, similar to its Phoenician value ([ħ]). However, the consonant /h/ was progressively lost from the spoken language (a process known as psilosis), and in those dialects where this had already happened early on in the archaic period, Η was instead used to denote the long vowel /ɛː/, which occurred next in its name and was thus, in the /h/-less dialects, its natural acrophonic value. Early psilotic dialects include eastern Ionic Greek, the Aeolic Greek of Lesbos, as well as the Doric Greek of Crete and Elis.

The distribution of vocalic Η and Ε differs further between dialects, because the Greek language had a system of three distinct e-like phonemes: the long open-mid /ɛː/ (classical spelling η), the long close-mid /eː/ (classical spelling ει), and the short vowel /e/ (classical spelling ε). In the psilotic dialects of Anatolia and adjacent eastern Aegean islands, as well as Crete, vocalic Η was used only for /ɛː/. In a number of Aegean islands, notably Rhodes, Milos, Santorini and Paros, it was used both for /h/ and for /ɛː/ without distinction. In Knidos, a variant letter was invented to distinguish the two functions: Η was used for /h/, and for /ɛː/. In south Italian colonies, especially Taranto, after c. 400 BC, a similar distinction was made between Η for /ɛː/, and for /h/. This latter symbol was later turned into the diacritic sign for rough breathing by the Alexandrine grammarians.

In Naxos the system was slightly different: here, too, the same letter was used for /h/ and for a long vowel, but only in those cases where a long e-like sound had arisen through raising from older /aː/, not – as other users of vocalic eta did – also for the older /ɛː/ inherited from proto-Greek. This probably means that while in the dialects of other eta users the old and new long e had already merged in a single phoneme, the raising sound in Naxos was still distinct both from /aː/ and /ɛː/, hence probably an [æ]-like sound.

Yet another distinction was found in a group of cities in the north-east of the Peloponnese, most notably Corinth: here, it was not the open-mid /ɛː/ that was distinguished among the three e-sounds, but the closed-mid /eː/. The normal letter epsilon (Ε) was used exclusively for the latter, while a new special symbol (or, in Sicyon,) stood both for short /e/ and for /ɛː/. Yet another variation of the system is found in neighbouring Tiryns: it uses the letter forms of the Corinthian system, versus E, but with the functional values of the classic eta versus epsilon system.

Region	/h/	/ɛː/		/e/	/eː/
Ionia, Aeolis, Crete	–	Η		Ε	Ε
Rhodes, Melos, Thera, Paros	Η	Η		Ε	Ε
Knidos	Η			Ε	Ε
Naxos	Η	Η (æː)	Ε	Ε	Ε
Tiryns	Η			Ε	Ε
Corinth, Megara, Sicyon	Η				Ε
others	Η	Ε		Ε	Ε

== Archaic letters ==
=== Digamma (Wau) ===
The letter Digamma (Ϝ) for the sound /w/ was generally used only in those local scripts where the sound was still in use in the spoken dialect. During the archaic period, this includes most of mainland Greece (except Attica), as well as Euboea and Crete. In Athens and in Naxos it was apparently used only in the register of poetry. Elsewhere, i.e. in most of the Aegean islands and the East, the sound /w/ was already absent from the language.

The shape of the letter varies locally and over time. The most common early form is. Over time it developed in analogy with Epsilon (which changed from to "E"), becoming either the classical "F" or. Early Crete had an archaic form (which resembled its original model, the Y-shaped Phoenician waw 𐤅), or a variant with the stem bent sideways.

=== San ===
Some local scripts used the M-shaped letter San (Ϻ) instead of standard Sigma to denote the sound /s/. It is unclear whether the distinction between the two letters originally corresponded to different phonetic realizations of the /s/ phoneme in different dialects. Epigrapher Lilian Hamilton Jeffery (1915–1986) conjectured that San originally stood for a voiced [z] sound, and that those Doric dialects that kept San instead of Sigma may have had such a pronunciation of /s/. Roger Woodard, professor of classics at the University at Buffalo, hypothesizes that San may originally have stood for [ts]. In any case, each dialect tended to use either San or Sigma to the exclusion of the other, and while the earliest abecedaria listed both letter shapes separately in their separate alphabetic positions, later specimens from the sixth century onwards tend to list only one of them. San was used in Argos until the end of the 6th century, in Sicyon until c. 500, in Corinth until the first half of the 5th century, and in Crete for some time longer. Sicyon kept the sign as a local emblem on its coins.

=== Koppa ===
The archaic letter Koppa or Qoppa (Ϙ), used for the back allophone of /k/ before back vowels [o, u], was originally common to most epichoric alphabets. It began to drop out of use from the middle of the 6th century BC. Some of the Doric regions, notably Corinth, Argos, Crete and Rhodes, kept it until the 5th century BC.

== Innovative letters ==
A few letters have arisen from innovative letter distinctions, most of them for local alphabets.

=== Omega ===
The new letter Omega (Ω) to denote the long half-open [ɔː] sound was invented first in the East, in the Ionian cities of Asia Minor, at some time before 600 BC. It was created by breaking up the closed circle of the Omicron (Ο), initially near the side. The letter was subsequently turned upright and the edges curled outwards.

The Dorian city of Knidos as well as a few Aegean islands, namely Paros, Thasos and Melos, chose the exact opposite innovation, using a broken-up circle for the short and a closed circle for the long /o/.

=== Sampi ===
Some Ionian cities used a special letter, alphabetically ordered behind Ω, for a sibilant sound in positions where other dialects had either ΣΣ or ΤΤ (e.g. τέͳαρες 'four', cf. normal spelling Ionic τέσσαρες vs. Attic τέτταρες). This symbol later dropped out of alphabetic use, but survived in the form of the numeral symbol sampi (modern ϡ). As an alphabetic character, it has been attested in the cities of Miletus, Ephesos, Halikarnassos, Erythrae, Teos (all situated in the region of Ionia in Asia Minor), in the island of Samos, in the Ionian colony of Massalia, and in Kyzikos (situated farther north in Asia Minor, in the region of Mysia). In Pontic Mesembria, on the Black Sea coast of Thrace, it was used on coins, which were marked with the abbreviation of the city's name, spelled ΜΕͲΑ. The sound denoted by this letter was a reflex of the proto-Greek consonant clusters *[kj], *[kʰj], *[tj], *[tʰj], or *[tw], and was probably an intermediate sound during the phonetic change from the earlier plosive clusters towards the later /s/ sound, possibly an affricate similar to /ts/.

=== Arcadian san ===
In one attested document, the Arcadocypriot Greek of Mantinea used an innovative letter similar to И, probably derived from a variant of san, to denote what was probably a [ts]-like sound in environments reflecting etymological Proto-Greek */kʷ/.

=== Pamphylian digamma ===
In the highly-divergent Pamphylian Greek, the letter digamma (Ϝ) existed side by side with another distinctive form. It has been surmised that in this dialect the sound /w/ may have changed to labiodental /v/ in some environments. The F-shaped letter may have stood for the new /v/ sound, while the special И-shaped form signified those positions where the old /w/ sound was preserved.

=== Boeotian raised E ===
A special letter for a variant realization of the short /e/ sound,, was briefly used in the Boeotian city of Thespiae in the late 5th century BC. It occurred in the place of normal epsilon (Ε) whenever the sound stood before another vowel. Since its shape suggests a compromise form between an Ε and an Ι, it is thought that it denoted a raised allophone, approaching /i/. It is attested in only one document, a set of grave stelae from 424 BC.

== Glyph shapes ==
Many of the letters familiar from the classical Greek alphabet displayed additional variation in shapes, with some of the variant forms being characteristic of specific local alphabets.

The form of Ζ generally had a straight stem in all local alphabets in the archaic period. Θ was mostly crossed ( or). Ξ typically had a vertical stem, and Φ was most often. Υ and Ψ had frequent variants where the strokes branched out from the bottom of the character, resulting in and respectively. Η was originally a closed rectangular shape and developed several variants with different numbers of arrangements of connecting bars between the two outer stems.

The early shape of Ε was typically, with the arms diagonal and the stem descending below the lowest arm; it developed to the modern orthogonal form Ε during the archaic era. An analogous change was observed with Ϝ, which changed from to either or Ϝ. Early forms of Μ typically had the left stem descending lower than the right stem; this remained a distinguishing feature in those varieties that also had san for /s/.

Π also typically had a shorter right stem. The top of Π could be curved rather than angular, approaching a Latin P. The Greek Ρ (Rho), in turn, could have a downward tail on the right, approaching a Latin R. In many red varieties, Δ too had variants where the left stroke was vertical, and the right edge of the letter sometimes rounded, approaching a Latin D.

The crooked shape of Σ could be written with different numbers of angles and strokes. Besides the classical form with four strokes, a three-stroke form resembling an angular Latin S was commonly found, and was particularly characteristic of some mainland Greek varieties including Attic and several "red" alphabets. The C-like "lunate" form of Σ that was later to become the standard form in late antiquity and Byzantine writing did not yet occur in the archaic alphabets.

The letter Ι had two principal variants: the classical straight vertical line, and a crooked form with three, four or more angular strokes. The crooked type was the older form, and remained common in those varieties where it could not be confused with sigma because sigma was absent in favour of san.

The letters Γ and Λ had multiple different forms that could often be confused with each other, as both are just an angle shape that could occur in various positions. C-like forms of Γ (either pointed or rounded) were common in many mainland varieties and in the West, where they inspired the Italic C; L-like shapes of Λ were particularly common in Euboea, Attica and Boeotia. Achaean colonies had a Γ in the form of single Ι-like vertical stroke.

The letter Α had different minor variants depending on the position of the middle bar, with some of them being characteristic of local varieties.

The letter Β had the largest number of highly divergent local forms. Besides the standard form (either rounded or pointed,), there were forms as varied as (Gortyn), and (Thera), (Argos), (Melos), (Corinth), (Megara, Byzantium), (Cyclades).

Κ, Ν, Ο and Τ displayed little variation and few or no differences from their classical forms.

All letters could additionally occur in a mirrored form, when text was written from right to left, as was frequently done in the earliest period.

== Important local alphabets ==
=== Old Attic ===
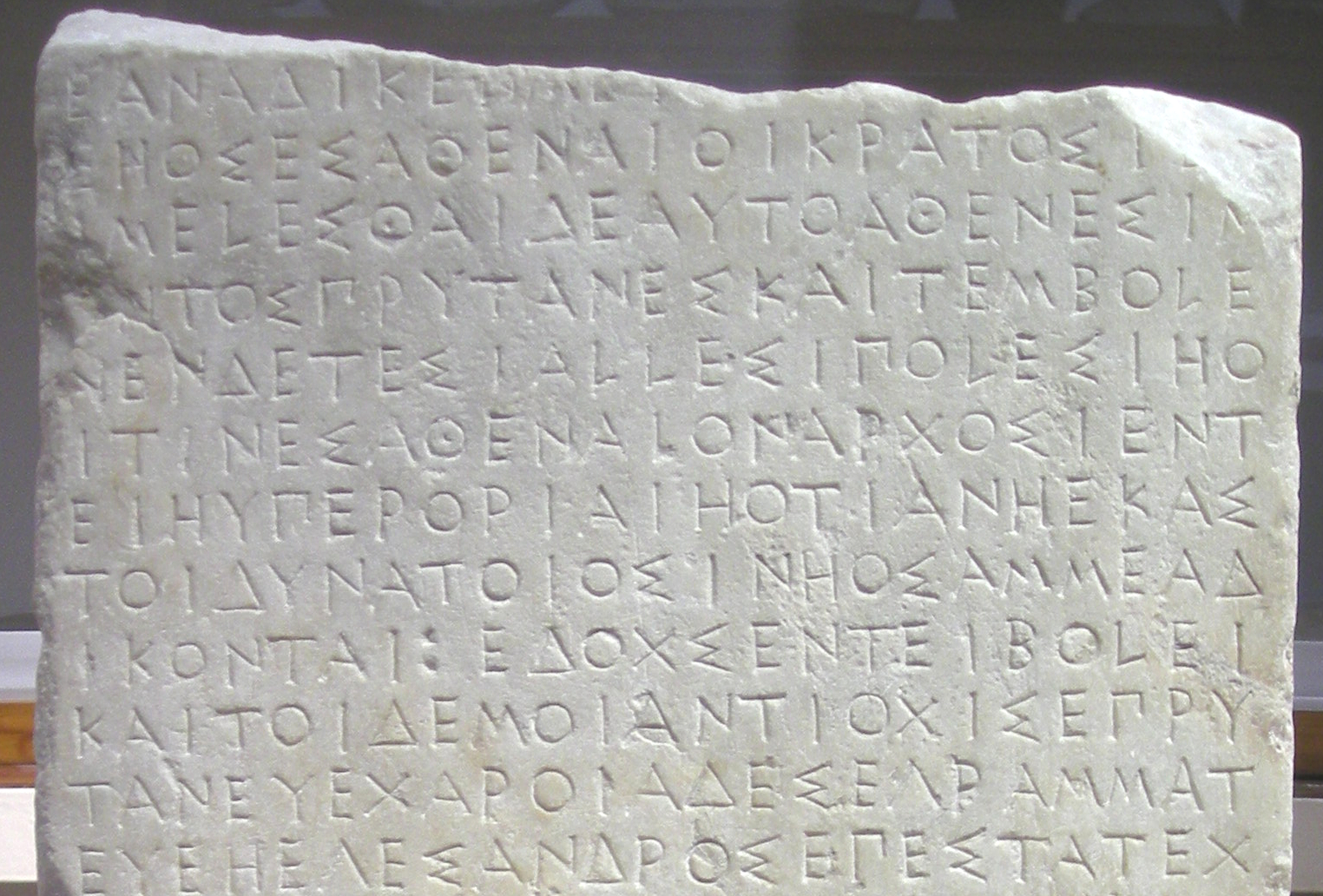
The phrase Ἔδοξεν τῇ Βουλῇ καὶ τῷ Δήμῳ ("The Council and the Citizens have decided") is typically spelled Εδοχσεν τει Βολει και τοι Δεμοι in inscriptions of the Athenian democracy prior to 403 BC.

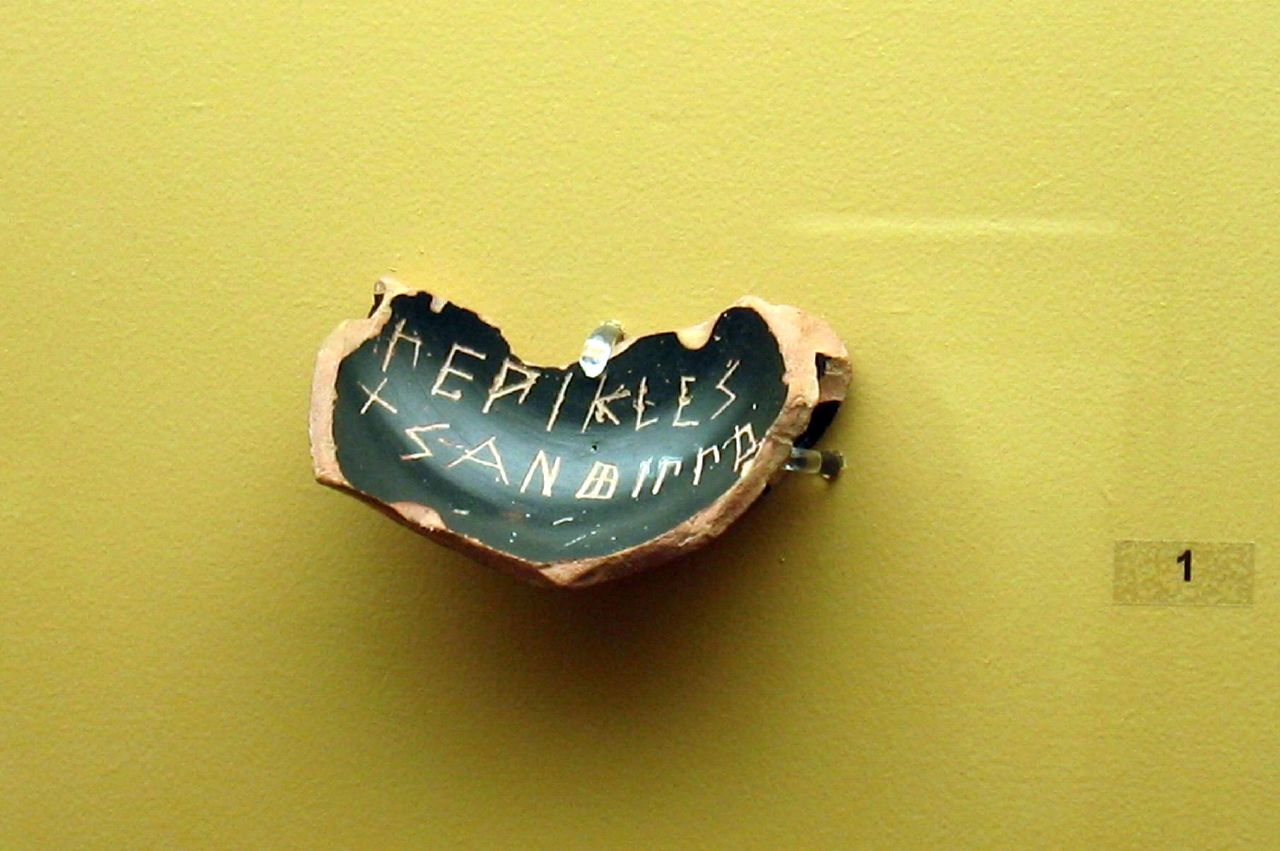
The name "Pericles, [son] of Xanthippos" (Περικλες Χσανθιππο) in contemporary Athenian spelling on an ostracon (cf. classical "Περικλῆς Ξανθίππου)".

Athens, until the late 5th century BC, used a variant of the "light blue" alphabet, with ΧΣ for /ks/ and ΦΣ for /ps/. Ε was used for all three sounds /e, eː, ɛː/ (correspondinɡ to classical Ε, ΕΙ, Η respectively), and Ο was used for all of /o, oː, ɔː/ (corresponding to classical Ο, ΟΥ, Ω respectively). Η was used for the consonant /h/. Among the characteristics of Athens writing were also some variant local letter forms, some of which were shared with the neighbouring (but otherwise "red") alphabet of Euboea: a form of Λ that resembled a Latin L and a form of Σ that resembled a Latin S.

By the late 5th century, use of elements of the Ionic alphabet side by side with this traditional local alphabet had become commonplace in private writing, and in 403 BC, a formal decree was passed that public writing would switch to the new Ionic orthography consistently, as part of the reform after the Thirty Tyrants. This new system was subsequently also called the "Eucleidian" alphabet, after the name of the archon Eucleides who oversaw the decision.

=== Euboean ===
The inscription of the so-called Cup of Nestor, found in Ischia; Euboean alphabet (written right to left), 8th century BC.

The Euboean alphabet was used in the cities of Eretria and Chalcis and in related colonies in southern Italy, notably in Cumae, Pithecusae and Rhegion. It was through this variant that the Greek alphabet was transmitted to Italy, where it gave rise to the Old Italic alphabets, including Etruscan and ultimately the Latin alphabet. Some of the distinctive features of the Latin as compared to the standard Greek script are already present in the Euboean model.

The Euboean alphabet belonged to the "western" ("red") type. It had Χ representing /ks/ and Ψ for /kʰ/. Like most early variants it also lacked Ω, and used Η for the consonant /h/ rather than for the vowel /ɛː/. It also kept the archaic letters digamma (Ϝ) for /w/ and qoppa (Ϙ) for /k/. San (Ϻ) for /s/ was not normally used in writing, but apparently still transmitted as part of the alphabet, because it occurs in abecedaria found in Italy and was later adopted by Etruscan.

Like Athens, Euboea had a form of Λ lambda that resembled a Latin L and a form of Σ sigma that resembled a Latin S. Other elements foreshadowing the Latin forms include Γ gamma shaped like a pointed C, Δ delta shaped like a pointed D, and Ρ rho shaped like R.

=== Corinthian ===
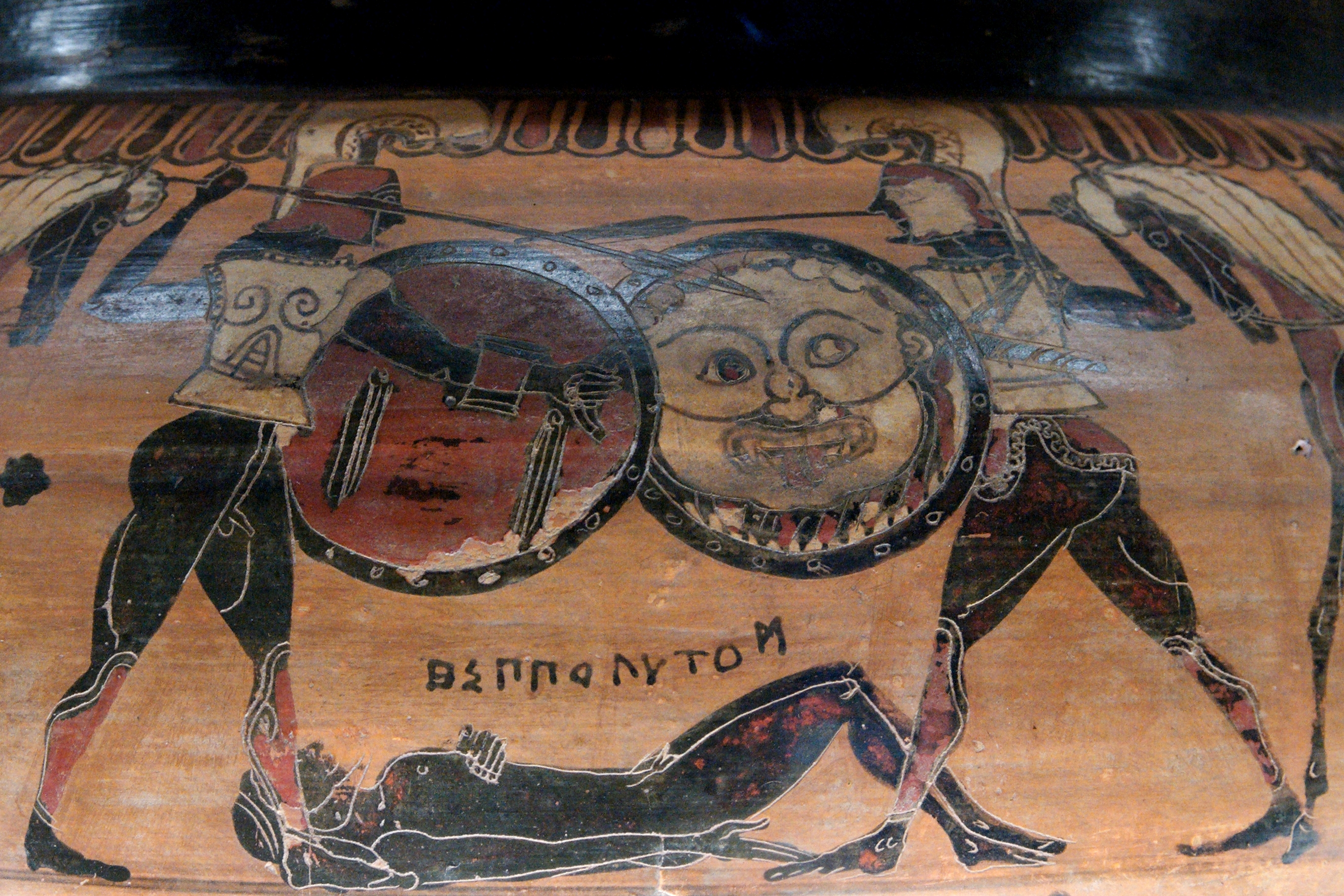
Corinthian black-figure column-krater, showing the name ΗΙΠΠΟΛΥΤΟΣ (Hippolytos) in Corinthian script.

The Doric dialect of Corinth was written in a distinctive alphabet that belonged to the "eastern" ("dark blue") type as far as its treatment of /pʰ, kʰ, ps, ks/ was concerned, but differed from the Ionic and classical alphabet in several other ways. Corinth used san (Ϻ) instead of Σ for /s/, and retained qoppa (Ϙ) for what was presumably a retracted allophone of /k/ before back vowels. As described above, it also had an uncommon system for marking its [e]-sounds, with a Β-shaped letter used for /e/ and /ɛː/ (classical Ε and Η respectively), and Ε used only for long close /eː/ (classical ΕΙ). For the consonant Β, in turn, Corinth used the special form. The letter Ι was written like a Σ.

]..........ΤΑΣ:ΧΑ.[
]....ΚΕΑΣ:ΑΝΓΑΡΙΟΣ[
]...ΑΥϜΙΟΣ:ΣΟΚΛΕΣ:[
].ΤΙΔΑΣ:ΑΜΥΝΤΑΣ[
]ΤΟΙ ΜΑΛΕϘΟ:ΚΑΙ.[

Pottery shard with inscribed names in archaic Corinthian script, c. 700 BC. At right: modern transcription.

== Summary table ==
The following summary of the principal characteristic forms of representative local Greek scripts between the 8th and the 4th centuries BC is based on the chapters on each dialect in Jeffery (1961). Letters representing long vowels are highlighted in yellow; digraphs are shown in parentheses.

Regional Greek alphabets
Region	Α	Β	Γ	Δ	Ε	Ϝ	Ζ	Η	Ͱ	Θ	Ι	Κ	Λ	Μ	Ν	Ξ	Ο	Π	Ϻ	Ϙ	Ρ	Σ	Τ	Υ	Φ	Χ	Ψ	Ω
Laconia								–											–									–
Arcadia								–											–									–
Achaea								–														–					?	–
Ithaca								–														–						–
Rhodes						–													–								(?)	–
Thessaly								–											–									–
Euboea								–											–									–
Boeotia								–											–									–
Attica								–											–									–
Aigina						–		–											–									–
Naxos																			–									–
Paros						–													–									
Delos						–													–								(?)	
Ionia						–			–										–									
Knidos		(?)				–													–	–							(?)	
Megara								–											–									–
Corinth								–														–						–
Sicyon								–														–						–
Argos								–																				–
Tiryns																						–						?
Melos						–																–						
Crete									–													–						–
Thera						–																–						–

== See also ==
- Alphabets of Asia Minor
- Linear A
- Linear B
- Trojan script

== Bibliography ==
- Brixhe, C. (1976). Le dialecte grec de Pamphylie. Documents et grammaire. Paris: Maisonneuve.
- Jeffery, Lilian H. (1961). The local scripts of archaic Greece. Oxford: Clarendon.
- Kirchhoff, Adolf (1877). Studien zur geschichte des griechischen alphabets (3rd rev ed.). Berlin: F. Dümmler. OL 24337090M.
- Nicholas, Nick (2005). "Proposal to add Greek epigraphical letters to the UCS. Technical report, Unicode Consortium, 2005" (PDF).
- Poinikastas – Epigraphic Sources for Early Greek Writing. Epigraphy site based on the archives of Lilian Jeffery, Oxford University.
- Threatte, Leslie (1980). The grammar of Attic inscriptions. Vol. I: Phonology. Berlin: De Gruyter.
- Voutiras, E. (2007). "The introduction of the alphabet". In Christidis [Christidēs], A.-F. [Anastasios-Phoivos] (ed.). A history of ancient Greek: from the beginnings to late antiquity. Cambridge. pp. 266–276. Revised and expanded translation of the Greek edition. (Christidis is the editor of the translation, not the 2001 original.)
- Wachter, R. (1998). "Eine Weihung an Athena von Assesos 1657". Epigraphica Anatolica. 30: 1.
- Willi, Andreas (2008). "Cows, houses, hooks: the Graeco-Semitic letter names as a chapter in the history of the alphabet". Classical Quarterly. 58 (2): 401–423. doi:10.1017/S0009838808000517. S2CID 170573480.
- Woodard, Roger D. (1997). Greek writing from Knossos to Homer: a linguistic interpretation of the origin of the Greek alphabet and the continuity of ancient Greek literacy. Oxford: Oxford University Press.
- Woodard, Roger D (2006). "Alphabet". In Wilson, Nigel Guy (ed.). Encyclopedia of ancient Greece. London: Routledge.
- Woodard, Roger D. (2008). "Greek dialects". The ancient languages of Europe. Cambridge: Cambridge University Press. ISBN 9780521684958.
- Woodard, Roger D. (2010). "Phoinikeia grammata: an alphabet for the Greek language". In Bakker, Egbert J. (ed.). A companion to the ancient Greek language. Oxford: Blackwell.
