= Papyrus Oxyrhynchus 37 =

Egyptian manuscript

Papyrus Oxyrhynchus 37 (P. Oxy. 37) is a report of a lawsuit by an unknown author, written in Greek. It was discovered by Grenfell and Hunt in 1897 in Oxyrhynchus. The fragment is dated to the 49 year CE. It is housed in the British Library (746) in London. The text was published by Grenfell and Hunt in 1898.

The manuscript was written on papyrus in the form of a sheet. The measurements of the fragment are 310 by 407 mm. The iota adscript is always written with final omega and eta in this papyrus.

== See also ==
- Oxyrhynchus Papyri
- Papyrus Oxyrhynchus 36
- Papyrus Oxyrhynchus 38
