= Eucleides =

Late 5th-century BC Athenian politician

Eucleides (Ancient Greek: Εὐκλείδης) was eponymous archon of Athens for the year running from July/August 403 BC until June/July 402 BC. His year in office was marked by Athens's official adoption of the Ionic alphabet. There is some evidence that he may have been personally involved in this decision.

== Archonship ==
During his archonship Athens abandoned the Attic alphabet in favour of the Ionic alphabet, which included the letters eta, phi, psi, and omega, but lacked heta. This alphabet had already been employed unofficially in inscriptions and other texts for some years, but was now adopted for official Athenian inscriptions. Although some Athenian inscriptions from before Eucleides's archonship already used the Ionian alphabet and others use the old Attic alphabet after it, the majority reflect the switch and Eucleides's archonship is thus an important milestone for dating Athenian inscriptions.

According to the historian Theopompus, the decree which introduced the new alphabet was passed by Archinus. It was probably connected to political efforts to end civil strife and reform the constitution in the aftermath of the Athenian defeat in the Peloponnesian War. Armand D'Angour proposes that the Ionic alphabet had been associated with aristocratic oligarchs in late fifth century BC Athens and that its adoption as the official alphabet was part of a policy of reconciliation by victorious Athenian democrats after they overthrew the short-lived oligarchic governments of the Four Hundred and the Thirty Tyrants. He also suggests that the archon Eucleides is identical with a secretary who was responsible for having a decree (IG I^{3} 110) inscribed in the Ionic alphabet in 408/7 BC and with a Eucleides mentioned in Aristotle's Poetics (1458b5-15) as having criticised poets who changed the vowel length to fit poetic meters. From there, D'Angour proposes that Eucleides was thus personally supportive of Archinus's decree.

Preceded by Pythodorus	Eponymous archon of Athens; 403 BC - 402 BC	Succeeded by Micon
