= Papyrus Oxyrhynchus 32 =

Roman manuscript

Papyrus Oxyrhynchus 32 (P. Oxy. 32) is a letter to a tribunus militum, written in Latin. It was discovered by Grenfell and Hunt in 1897 in Oxyrhynchus. The fragment is dated to the second century. It is housed in the Bodleian Library. The text was published by Grenfell and Hunt in 1898.

The letter was written to Julius Domitius, military tribune of the legion, by Aurelius Archelaus.

The manuscript was written on papyrus in the form of a sheet. The measurements of the fragment are 196 by 105 mm. The text is written in a cursive hand. The writing is very clear and easy to decipher.

== See also ==
- Oxyrhynchus Papyri
- Papyrus Oxyrhynchus 31
- Papyrus Oxyrhynchus 33
