= Archinus =

Late 5th/early 4th-century BC Athenian politician

Archinus (Ancient Greek: Ἀρχῖνος) was an Athenian democratic politician who wielded substantial influence between the restoration of democracy in 403 BC and the beginning of the Corinthian War in 395 BC.

In the early days of the restored democracy, he acted to weaken the oligarchic exiles at Eleusis by ending the period during which citizens could register to emigrate to Eleusis before its announced ending date. He seems to have advocated a moderate democratic policy, opposing motions to expand the franchise and restore the levels of pay for civil service that had typified the golden days of Periclean democracy in Athens in the mid-5th century BC.

Archinus is also said to have encouraged the official adoption by Athens of the 24-letter Ionic alphabet in 403–2 (Suda, Σαμίων ὁ δῆμος), alongside the archon Eucleides.
