= Papyrus Oxyrhynchus 36 =

Customs regulations written in Greek

Papyrus Oxyrhynchus 36 (P. Oxy. 36) contains customs regulations by an unknown author, written in Greek. It was discovered by Grenfell and Hunt in 1897 in Oxyrhynchus. The fragment is dated to the second or the early third century. It is housed in the Bodleian Library (Ms. Gr. Class. d 60) at the University of Oxford. The text was published by Grenfell and Hunt in 1898.

The manuscript was written on papyrus in the form of a sheet. The measurements of the fragment are 104 by 279 mm. The text is written in medium-sized cursive letters.

== See also ==
- Oxyrhynchus Papyri
- Papyrus Oxyrhynchus 35
- Papyrus Oxyrhynchus 37
