= Papyrus Oxyrhynchus 30 =

Historical fragment

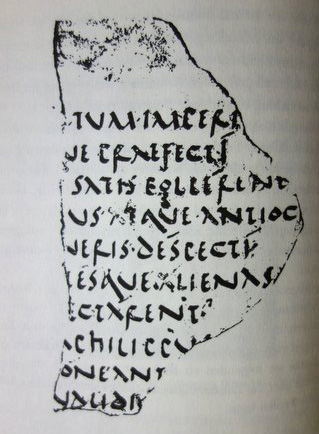
Facsimile of fragment

Papyrus Oxyrhynchus 30 (P. Oxy. 30) is a historical fragment in Latin. It was discovered by Grenfell and Hunt in 1897 in Oxyrhynchus. The fragment is dated to the third century. It is housed in the Department of Manuscripts of the British Library. The text was published by Grenfell and Hunt in 1898.

The manuscript was written on vellum in the form of a codex. The measures of a single leaf are 86 by 50 mm. The text is written in an uncial script. The words are not divided at the end of lines. The subject of the composition was probably the Macedonian Wars.

== See also ==
- Oxyrhynchus Papyri
- Papyrus Oxyrhynchus 29
- Papyrus Oxyrhynchus 31
