= Papyrus Oxyrhynchus 34 =

Fragment discovered in Oxyrhynchus

Papyrus Oxyrhynchus 34 (P. Oxy. 34) is an edict of a praefect concerning archives of an unknown author, written in Greek. It was discovered by Grenfell and Hunt in 1897 in Oxyrhynchus. The fragment is dated to 2 October 127 CE. It is housed in the Bodleian Library. The text was published by Grenfell and Hunt in 1898.

The manuscript was written on papyrus in the form of a sheet. The measurements of the fragment are 210 by 755 mm. The text is written in a semi-uncial hand.

== See also ==
- Oxyrhynchus Papyri
- Papyrus Oxyrhynchus 33
- Papyrus Oxyrhynchus 35
