= Papyrus Oxyrhynchus 35 =

Greek manuscript

Papyrus Oxyrhynchus 35 (P. Oxy. 35) is a proclamation and list of emperors by an unknown author. It is written in the Greek language. The papyrus was discovered by Grenfell and Hunt in 1897 in Oxyrhynchus, and is dated to the year 223. The text was published by Grenfell and Hunt in 1898.

The list is generally accurate. It enumerates the Roman emperors along with the number of years each ruled, from Augustus to Decius. However, there are a number of errors in the list, for example, Caligula (Gaius) and Galba are omitted.

The manuscript was written on papyrus in the form of a sheet. The measurements of the fragment are 138 by 134 mm. The text is written in medium-sized cursive letters.

== See also ==
- Oxyrhynchus Papyri
- Papyrus Oxyrhynchus 34
- Papyrus Oxyrhynchus 36
