= Papyrus Oxyrhynchus 33 =

Fragments of papyrus in the Greek language

Papyrus Oxyrhynchus 33 (P. Oxy. 33) is a fragment of the report of the trial of an Egyptian official named Appianus before the Emperor, possibly Marcus Aurelius, who sentenced him to death. The report, written in Greek, was deposited in the archives of Oxyrhynchus, and is dated to the second century. It was discovered by Grenfell and Hunt in 1897 and published the following year. It is housed in the British Museum (2435).

The manuscript was written in semi-uncial script on a sheet of papyrus and measures 150 by 447 mm. There are a few corrections.

== See also ==
- Oxyrhynchus Papyri
- Papyrus Oxyrhynchus 32
- Papyrus Oxyrhynchus 34
