= Papyrus Oxyrhynchus 31 =

5th-century Latin manuscript

Papyrus Oxyrhynchus 31 (P. Oxy. 31) contains two fragments of the first book of Virgil's Aeneid (457-467 and 495–507) written in Latin. It was discovered by Grenfell and Hunt in 1897 in Oxyrhynchus. The fragment is dated to the fifth century. It is housed in the Cambridge University Library. The text was published by Grenfell and Hunt in 1898.

The manuscript was written on papyrus in the form of a codex. The measurements of the fragment are 66 by 54 mm. The original page was about 26 cm high. The text is written in a small upright semi-uncial hand in brown ink. Grenfell and Hunt collated the text of the fragment on the basis of the Ribbeck text (1860).

== See also ==
- Oxyrhynchus Papyri
- Papyrus Oxyrhynchus 30
- Papyrus Oxyrhynchus 32
