= Heta =

Archaic letter in the Greek alphabet

Heta is a conventional name for the historical Greek alphabet letter eta (Η) and several of its variants, when used in their original function of denoting the consonant /h/.

The letter Η had been adopted by Greek from the Phoenician letter heth originally with this consonantal sound value, and hēta was its original name. The Italic alphabets, and ultimately Latin, adopted the letter H from this Greek usage. However, Greek dialects progressively lost the sound /h/ from their phonological systems. In the Ionic dialects, where this loss of /h/ happened early, the name of the letter naturally changed to ēta, and the letter was subsequently turned from a consonant to a new use as a vowel, denoting the long half-open /ɛː/ sound. In this function it later entered the classical orthography adopted across the whole of Greece. According to traditional accounts, the new vowel, ēta, was originally the innovation of the poet Simonides of Ceos (556-468 BC).

An archaic inscription from Thera, displaying H both in consonantal function (line 2: "ΚΗ" = χ in "Ἀρχαγέτας") and as a vowel (line 3: "Πρόκλης").

In dialects that still had the /h/ sound as part of their phonological systems, including early Athens, the same letter continued to be used in its consonantal function. Just like vocalic eta, it could occur in a number of glyph variants in different local varieties of the alphabet, including one shaped like a square "8" similar to the original Phoenician, but also a plain square, a crossed square, shapes with two horizontal or with diagonal bars.

Various spellings of the name "Hera" in ancient Greek. Left: original spelling, right: modern transcription. Red: consonantal "heta", blue: vocalic "eta". 1.) archaic non-Ionic 2.) classical Ionic 3.) intermediate (e.g. Delphi) 4.) intermediate (e.g. Tarentum) 5.) late antiquity.

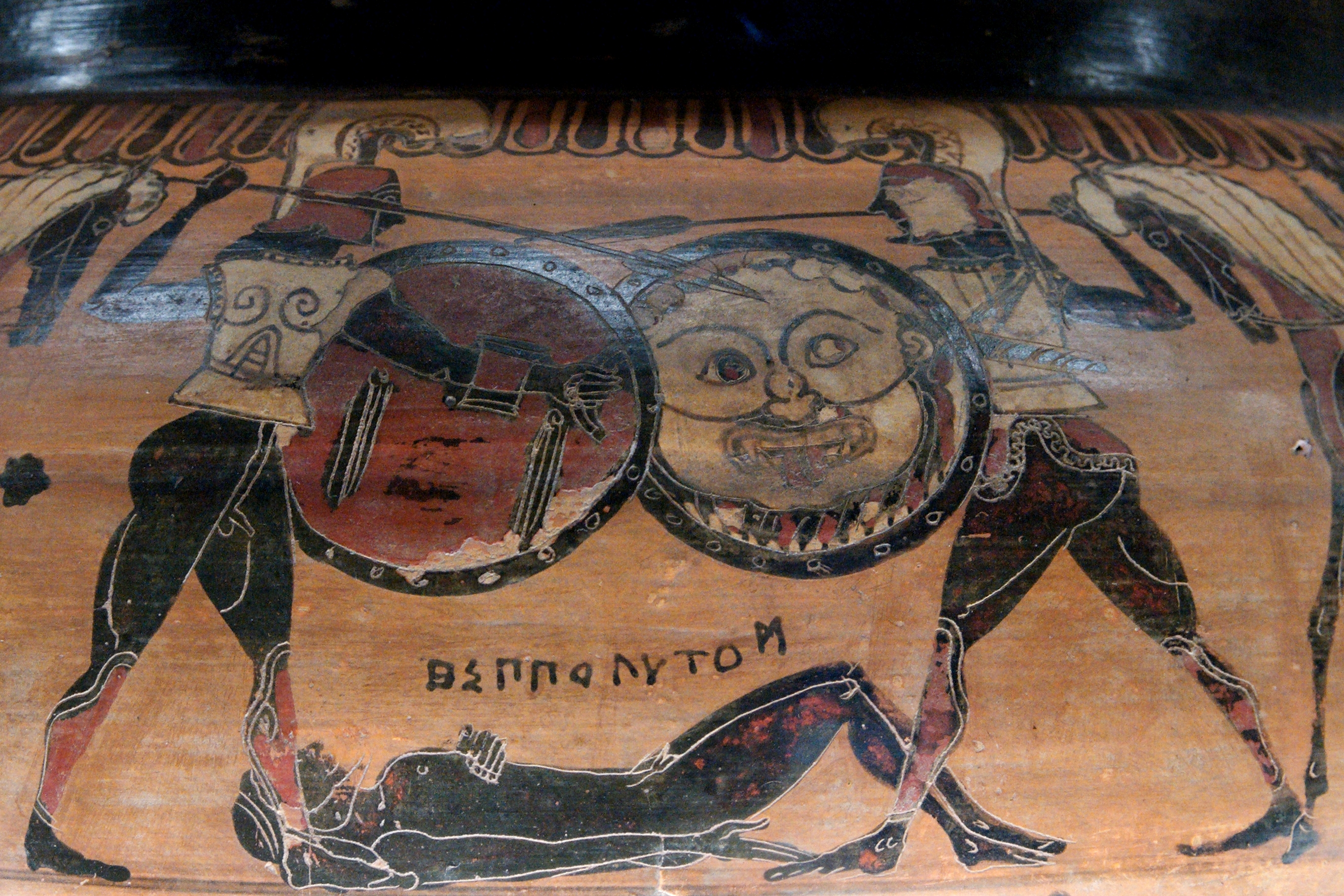
The name Hippolytos inscribed on a Corinthian black-figure column-krater, ca. 575–550 BC, showing square-8-shaped consonantal heta, zigzag-shaped Iota, archaic Pi, and M-shaped San instead of Sigma.

During the classical era, more dialects adopted the new Ionian vocalic eta (as Athens did around c. 400 BC). As many of these dialects nevertheless still also pronounced /h/, they faced the problem of distinguishing between their own old consonantal symbol and the new vocalic symbol. Some dialects, including classical Attic, simply omitted the marking of the /h/-sound. In others (for instance Rhodes), the same symbol was used in both functions. Others distinguished between glyph variants, for instance in Delphi by using the closed square sign for /h/, and the open H for the vowel. In the southern Italian colonies of Heraclea and Tarentum, a new innovative shape for /h/ was invented, consisting of a single vertical stem and a rightward-pointing horizontal bar, like a half H. From this sign, later scholars developed the rough breathing or spiritus asper, which brought back the marking of the old /h/ sound into the standardized post-classical (polytonic) orthography of Greek in the form of a diacritic.

From scholia to the grammar of Dionysius Thrax, it appears that the memory of the former consonantal value of the letter Η was still alive in the era of the Alexandrine Koiné insofar as the name of the vocalic η was still pronounced "heta" and accordingly written with a rough breathing. The later standard spelling of the name eta, however, has the smooth breathing.

Διὰ τί τὸ η̅ πρὸ τοῦ τ̅ ψιλοῦται, ἐν δὲ τῷ ἧτα τῷ ὀνόματι τοῦ στοιχείου δασύνεται; Ἐπειδὴ παρὰ τοῖς ἀρχαίοις ὁ τύπος τοῦ Η ἐν τύπῳ δασείας ἔκειτο, ὥσπερ καὶ νῦν ⟨παρὰ⟩ τοῖς Ῥωμαίοις.

Translation:

Why does η before τ have a smooth breathing, but in the letter name "ἥτα" [heta] it has the rough breathing? – Because in the old days the letter Η served to stand for the rough breathing, as it still does with the Romans.

Διὰ τί δὲ πάντων τῶν φωνηέντων ψιλουμένων, μόνου τοῦ υ̅ φυσικὴν δασεῖαν ἔχοντος, τὸ ἧτα δασύνεται; Ὅτι πάλαι τὸ Η χαρακτὴρ ἦν τῆς δασείας· τοῦ Η τοίνυν χαρακτῆρα τῆς δασείας ἔχοντος, εὐλόγως καὶ τὸ ὄνομα αὐτοῦ δασύνεται· καὶ γὰρ ἄτοπον ἦν ἄλλοις χορηγοῦν τὴν πρόσπνευσιν τῆς δασείας αὐτὸ ταύτης στερεῖσθαι.

Translation:

Why, when all vowel letters start with a smooth breathing, and only "υ" has a rough breathing by nature, does "ἧτα" [heta] have the rough breathing? – Because formerly Η was the sign of the rough breathing. Thus, since Η has the property of the rough breathing, it is logical that its own name should also have it, because it would be inappropriate if it should impart the aspiration to other letters but lack it itself.

Under the Roman emperor Claudius in the mid-1st century AD, Latin briefly re-borrowed the letter in the shape of the half-H tack glyph, as one of the so-called Claudian letters. It denoted the sonus medius, a short close vowel sound of a quality between i and u.

In modern transcriptions and editions of ancient Greek epigraphic text that use consonantal heta, in any of its shapes, the letter is most often rendered simply with a Latin h, both in Latin transliteration and in Greek scholarly transcriptions (using lowercase in Greek, so that Latin h and Greek η are distinct). Some authors have also adopted the Heraclean "tack" heta for use in modern transcription. Jeffery (1961) uses the tack symbol also as a modern label for the abstract grapheme, i.e. as a cover label for any letter shape denoting /h/ in any given local alphabet.

Unicode "Greek letter Heta" in an uppercase and lowercase version

The Unicode standard of computer encoding introduced code points for a tack-shaped "Greek letter Heta" designed for this usage in its version 5.1 of April 2008. Like other archaic letters, Unicode Heta comes in an uppercase and lowercase variant to cater for the needs of modern typography. Type designers have created several designs for this new typographic lowercase form, one of them resembling a lowercase Latin h with a straight rightward horizontal bar. The Greek Heta codepoints are distinct from another set designed to represent the tack-shaped Claudian "Latin letter half H" (Latin Extended-C).

- U+0370 Ͱ GREEK CAPITAL LETTER HETA
- U+0371 ͱ GREEK SMALL LETTER HETA
- U+2C75 Ⱶ LATIN CAPITAL LETTER HALF H
- U+2C76 ⱶ LATIN SMALL LETTER HALF H
