= Lilian Hamilton Jeffery =

British archaeologist, classical philologist and epigraphist

L. H. Jeffrey FBA
- Born: 5 January 1915; Westcliff-on-Sea, Essex, England
- Died: 29 September 1986 (aged 71)
- Awards: Fellow of the British Academy, 1965

Academic background
- Education: Newnham College, Cambridge; University of Oxford (DPhil, 1951)

Academic work
- Discipline: Classics
- Sub-discipline: Greek epigraphy
- Institutions: Lady Margaret Hall, Oxford
- Notable works: The Local Scripts of Archaic Greece (1961)

Lilian Hamilton "Anne" Jeffery FBA (5 January 1915 – 29 September 1986) was a British archaeologist, classical philologist and epigraphist best remembered for her 1961 work The Local Scripts of Archaic Greece. Building on the work of Adolf Kirchhoff and Antony E. Raubitschek, Jeffery surveyed the development of the Greek alphabet from its adoption down to the fifth century BC and in so doing established the chronology of archaic inscriptions.

== Early life ==
Lilian (Anne) Jeffery was born at Westcliff-on-Sea to, Thomas Theophilus Jeffery, a schoolmaster and lecturer in classics, and Lilian Mary Hamilton. She was educated at Cheltenham Ladies' College and in 1933 won a Major Classical scholarship to Newnham College, Cambridge where she studied under Jocelyn Toynbee.

== Career ==
She won the Walton Studenship to the British School at Athens in 1937, where she contributed to the work of Antony E. Raubitschek on the sculptural fragments of the Acropolis, co-publishing with him the 1949 book Dedications from the Athenian Akropolis. She served in the WAAF during World War II; part of her duties included intelligence interpretation of aerial photographs.

In 1946 she took up the position of research fellow at Lady Margaret Hall, Oxford, where she remained for the rest of her career apart from a period of research at the Institute of Advanced Studies at Princeton from September 1951 to June 1952. Her archaeological work included field study with the British School at Old Smyrna (Bayrakli) in 1949. She also made major contributions to the study of Attic grave monuments and the epigraphical edition project Inscriptiones Graecae i^{3}. From 1955 until 1961 she was an editor of the Annual of the British School at Athens. She was made a Fellow of the British Academy in 1965.

Her archive is preserved at the Centre for the Study of Ancient Documents, Oxford, digitised and published online.

== Selected works ==
- ed. with Antony E. Raubitschek, Dedications from the Athenian Akropolis: A catalogue of the inscriptions of the 6. and 5. centuries B. C. (1949)
- 'Demiourgoi in the Archaic period' Archeologia classica (1973–1974) 25–26:319–330.
- The Local Scripts of Archaic Greece: A Study of the Origin of the Greek Alphabet and Its Development from the Eighth to the Fifth Centuries B.C. (1961)
- Archaia grammata, some ancient Greek views. (1967)
- 'Poinikastas and poinikazen, BM 1969, 4–2.1: a new archaic inscription from Crete.' Kadmos, (1970) 9:118–154
- 'An Archaic Greek Inscription from Crete' The British Museum Quarterly, (1971) 36:24–29
- Lykios son of Myron: the epigraphic evidence in Στήλη Τόμος Εις Μνήμην Νικολάου Κοντολέοντος (1971)
- Archaic Greece: The City States, c.700-500 B.C. (1976)
- Some Nikai-statues at Olympia in the late fifth century B.C. (1979)
- Inscriptiones Graecae/ Vol. 1, Inscriptiones Atticae Euclidis anno anteriores; ediderunt David Lewis et Lilian Jeffery, adiuvante Eberhard Erxleben. Fasc. 2, Dedicationes, catalogi, termini, tituli sepulcrales, varia, tituli Attici extra Atticam reperti, addenda. (1994)
