= Eta =

Seventh letter in the Greek alphabet

Eta (/ˈiːtə, ˈeɪtə/ EE-tə, AY-tə; uppercase Η, lowercase η; Ancient Greek: ἦτα ē̂ta [ɛ̂ːta] or Greek: ήτα ita [ˈita]) is the seventh letter of the Greek alphabet, representing the close front unrounded vowel, [i]. Originally denoting the voiceless glottal fricative, [h], in most dialects of Ancient Greek, its sound value in the classical Attic dialect was a long open-mid front unrounded vowel, [ɛː], which was later raised to [i] in Hellenistic Greek, a process known as iotacism or itacism.

In the ancient Attic number system (Herodianic or acrophonic numbers), the number 100 was represented by "Η", because it was the initial of ΗΕΚΑΤΟΝ, the ancient spelling of ἑκατόν = "one hundred". In the later system of (Classical) Greek numerals eta represents 8.

Eta was derived from the Phoenician letter heth 𐤇. Letters that arose from eta include the Latin H and the Cyrillic letters И and Й.

== History ==
=== Consonant h ===
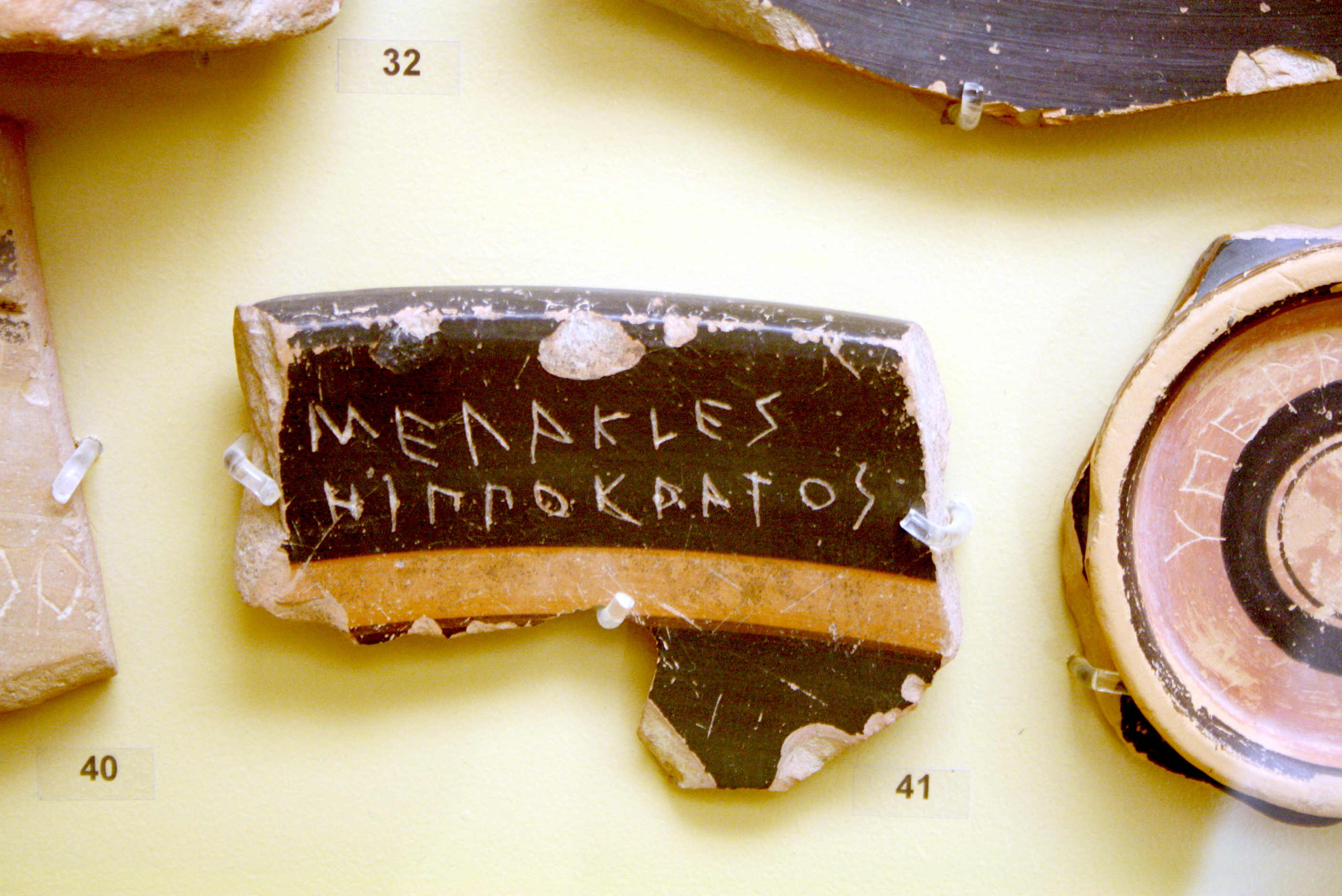
Eta (heta) in the function of /h/ on the ostrakon of Megacles, son of Hippocrates, 487 BC. Inscription: ΜΕΓΑΚLES HIΠΠΟΚRATOS equivalent to the later Μεγακλῆς Ἱπποκράτους. On display in the Ancient Agora Museum in Athens, housed in the Stoa of Attalus.

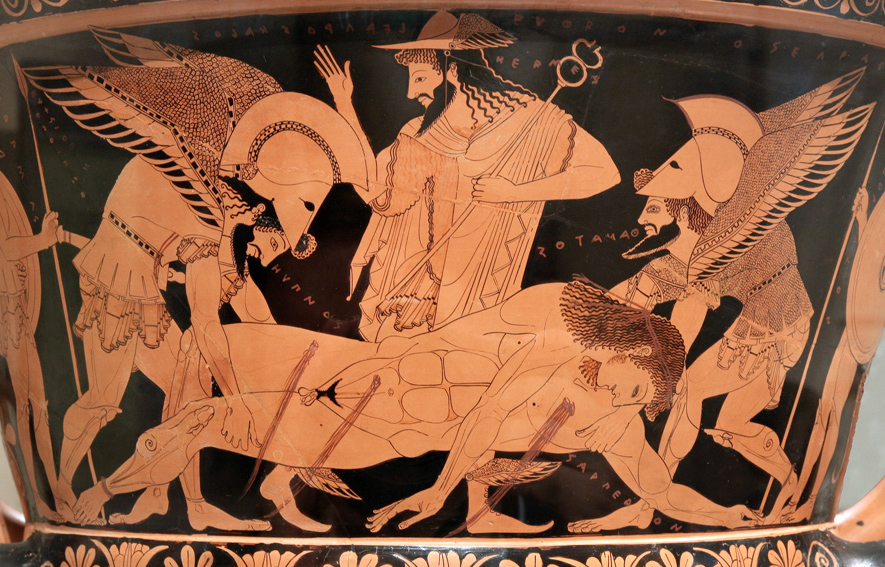
Eta in the function of /h/ on an Attic red-figured calyx-krater, 515 BC. Amongst the depicted figures are Hermes and Hypnos. Inscriptions: ΗΕΡΜΕΣ – ΗΥΠΝΟΣ.

The letter shape 'H' was originally used in most Greek dialects to represent the voiceless glottal fricative, [h]. In this function, it was borrowed in the 8th century BC by the Etruscan and other Old Italic alphabets, which were based on the Euboean form of the Greek alphabet. This also gave rise to the Latin alphabet with its letter H.

Other regional variants of the Greek alphabet (epichoric alphabets), in dialects that still preserved the sound [h], employed various glyph shapes for consonantal heta side by side with the new vocalic eta for some time. In the southern Italian colonies of Heraclea and Tarentum, the letter shape was reduced to a "half-heta" lacking the right vertical stem (Ͱ). From this sign later developed the sign for rough breathing or spiritus asper, which brought back the marking of the [h] sound into the standardized post-classical (polytonic) orthography. Dionysius Thrax in the second century BC records that the letter name was still pronounced heta (ἥτα), correctly explaining this irregularity by stating "in the old days the letter Η served to stand for the rough breathing, as it still does with the Romans."

=== Long e ===
In the East Ionic dialect, however, the sound [h] disappeared by the sixth century BC, and the letter was re-used initially to represent a development of a long open front unrounded vowel, [aː], which later merged in East Ionic with the long open-mid front unrounded vowel, [ɛː] instead. In 403 BC, Athens took over the Ionian spelling system and with it the vocalic use of H (even though it still also had the [h] sound itself at that time). This later became the standard orthography in all of Greece.

=== Itacism ===
During the time of post-classical Koine Greek, the [ɛː] sound represented by eta was raised and merged with several other formerly distinct vowels, a phenomenon called iotacism or itacism, after the new pronunciation of the letter name as ita instead of eta.

Itacism is continued into Modern Greek, where the letter name is pronounced [ˈita] and represents the close front unrounded vowel, [i]. It shares this function with several other letters (ι, υ) and digraphs (ει, οι, υι), which are all pronounced alike.

=== Cyrillic script ===
Eta was also borrowed with the sound value of [i] into the Cyrillic script, where it gave rise to the Cyrillic letter И.

== Uses ==
=== Letter ===
In Modern Greek, due to iotacism, the letter (pronounced [ˈita]) represents a close front unrounded vowel, [i]. In Classical Greek, it represented the long open-mid front unrounded vowel, [ɛː].

=== Symbol ===
==== Upper case ====
The uppercase letter Η is used as a symbol in textual criticism for the Alexandrian text-type (from Hesychius, its once-supposed editor).

In chemistry, the letter H as symbol of enthalpy sometimes is said to be a Greek eta, but since enthalpy comes from ἐνθάλπος, which begins in a smooth breathing and epsilon, it is more likely a Latin H for 'heat'.

In information theory the uppercase Greek letter Η is used to represent the concept of entropy of a discrete random variable.

==== Lower case ====
The lowercase letter η is used as a symbol in:

- Thermodynamics, the efficiency of a Carnot heat engine, or packing fraction.
- Aeronautics, the propulsive efficiency, or percentage of chemical energy converted to kinetic energy.
- Chemistry, the hapticity, or the number of atoms of a ligand attached to one coordination site of the metal in a coordination compound. For example, an allyl group can coordinate to palladium in the η¹ mode (only one atom of an allyl group attached to palladium) or the η³ mode (3 atoms attached to palladium).
- Optics, the electromagnetic impedance of a medium, or the quantum efficiency of detectors.
- Particle physics, to represent the η mesons.
- Experimental particle physics, η stands for pseudorapidity.
- Cosmology, η represents conformal time; dt = adη.
- Cosmology, baryon–photon ratio.
- Relativity and Quantum field theory (physics), η (with two subscripts) represents the metric tensor of Minkowski space (flat spacetime).
- Statistics, η^{2} is the "partial regression coefficient". η is the symbol for the linear predictor of a generalized linear model, and can also be used to denote the median of a population, or thresholding parameter in Sparse Partial Least Squares regression.
- Economics, often used to denote elasticity, although ε is also widely used
- Astronomy, the seventh-brightest (usually) star in a constellation. See Bayer designation.
- Mathematics, η-reduction in lambda calculus.
- Mathematics, the Dirichlet eta function, Dedekind eta function, and Weierstrass eta function.
- Nuclear physics, the number of fast fission neutrons produced per thermal neutron absorbed by the "fuel."
- In category theory, the unit of an adjunction or monad is usually denoted η.
- Biology, a DNA polymerase found in higher eukaryotes and implicated in Translesion Synthesis.
- Neural network backpropagation, and stochastic gradient descent more generally, η stands for the learning rate.
- Telecommunications, η stands for efficiency
- Electronics, η stands for the ideality factor of a bipolar transistor, and has a value close to 1.000. It appears in contexts where the transistor is used as a temperature sensing device, e.g. the thermal "diode" transistor that is embedded within a computer's microprocessor.
- Power electronics, η stands for the efficiency of a power supply, defined as the output power divided by the input power.
- Atmospheric science, η represents absolute atmospheric vorticity.
- Rheology, η represents viscosity.
- Oceanography, η is the measurement (usually in metres) of sea-surface height above or below the mean sea-level at that same location.

== Unicode ==
- U+0370 Ͱ GREEK CAPITAL LETTER HETA
- U+0371 ͱ GREEK SMALL LETTER HETA
- U+0397 Η GREEK CAPITAL LETTER ETA (&Eta;)
- U+03B7 η GREEK SMALL LETTER ETA (&eta;) (\eta in TeX)
- U+2C8E Ⲏ COPTIC CAPITAL LETTER HATE
- U+2C8F ⲏ COPTIC SMALL LETTER HATE

These characters are used only as mathematical symbols. Stylized Greek text should be encoded using the normal Greek letters, with markup and formatting to indicate text style:

- U+1D6AE 𝚮 MATHEMATICAL BOLD CAPITAL ETA
- U+1D6C8 𝛈 MATHEMATICAL BOLD SMALL ETA
- U+1D6E8 𝛨 MATHEMATICAL ITALIC CAPITAL ETA
- U+1D702 𝜂 MATHEMATICAL ITALIC SMALL ETA
- U+1D722 𝜢 MATHEMATICAL BOLD ITALIC CAPITAL ETA
- U+1D73C 𝜼 MATHEMATICAL BOLD ITALIC SMALL ETA
- U+1D75C 𝝜 MATHEMATICAL SANS-SERIF BOLD CAPITAL ETA
- U+1D776 𝝶 MATHEMATICAL SANS-SERIF BOLD SMALL ETA
- U+1D796 𝞖 MATHEMATICAL SANS-SERIF BOLD ITALIC CAPITAL ETA
- U+1D7B0 𝞰 MATHEMATICAL SANS-SERIF BOLD ITALIC SMALL ETA

== See also ==
- Hurricane Eta
