= Adolf Kirchhoff =

German classical philologist and epigrapher (1826–1908)

Johann Wilhelm Adolf Kirchhoff
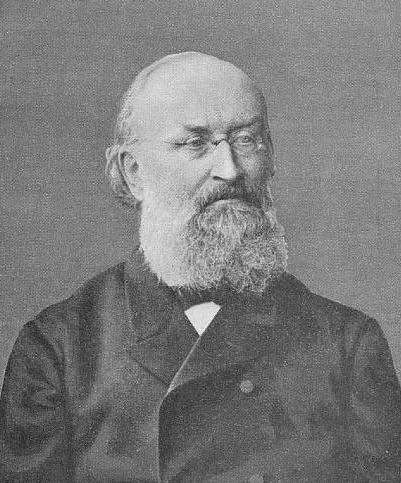
- Born: 6 January 1826; Berlin, Kingdom of Prussia
- Died: 26 February 1908 (aged 82); Berlin, German Empire
- Scientific career
- Fields: Classics, Epigraphy
- Workplaces: University of Berlin

Johann Wilhelm Adolf Kirchhoff (6 January 1826 – 26 February 1908) was a German classical scholar and epigraphist.

== Biography ==
The son of historical painter Johann Jakob Kirchhoff, he was born in Berlin, and educated there. He then taught in various colleges until, in 1865, he was appointed professor of classical philology at the University of Berlin, where he remained for the rest of his life. Kirchhoff's scientific studies covered a wide range in linguistics, antiquities, and Greek epigraphy. He was elected a Foreign Honorary Member of the American Academy of Arts and Sciences in 1888.

== Writings ==
- Die Homerische Odyssee (1859), putting forward an entirely new theory as to the composition of the Odyssey
- edition of Plotinus (1856)
- edition of Euripides (1855 and 1877–1878), the first critical edition based on a careful collation of all the manuscripts
- edition of Aeschylus (1880)
- Hesiod (Works and Days, 1881)
- Xenophon, Respublica Atheniensium (On the Athenian Constitution; 3rd edition, 1889)
- Über die Entstehungszeit des Herodotischen Geschichtswerkes (2nd edition, 1878)
- Thukydides und sein Urkundenmaterial (1895).

The following works are the result of his epigraphical and palaeographical studies:

- Die Umbrischen Sprachdenkmäler (1851)
- Das Stadtrecht von Bantia (1853), on the tablet discovered in 1790 at Oppido near Banzi, containing a plebiscite relating to the municipal affairs of the ancient Bantia (the Stadtrecht)
- Das Gotische Runenalphabet (1852)
- Die Fränkischen Runen (1855)
- Studien zur Geschichte des Griechischen Alphabets (3rd, revised edition, 1887).

The second part of volume iv. of the Corpus Inscriptionum Graecarum (1859, containing the Christian inscriptions) and volume i. of the Corpus Inscriptionum Atticarum (1873, containing the inscriptions before 403) with supplements thereto (volume iv. pts. 13, 1877–1891) are edited by him. From 1860 to 1902, he was in charge of the Inscriptiones Graecae. He edited Hermes (1866–81).
