= Greek and Coptic =

- Range: U+0370..U+03FF (144 code points)
- Plane: BMP
- Scripts: Greek (117 char.); Coptic (14 char.); Common (4 char.)
- Major alphabets: Greek
- Assigned: 135 code points
- Unused: 9 reserved code points
- Source standards: ISO 8859-7

Unicode version history
- 1.0.0 (1991): 112 (+112)
- 1.0.1 (1992): 103 (-9)
- 1.1 (1993): 105 (+2)
- 3.0 (1999): 110 (+5)
- 3.1 (2001): 112 (+2)
- 3.2 (2002): 115 (+3)
- 4.0 (2003): 120 (+5)
- 4.1 (2005): 124 (+4)
- 5.0 (2006): 127 (+3)
- 5.1 (2008): 134 (+7)
- 7.0 (2014): 135 (+1)

Unicode documentation
- Code chart ∣ Web page

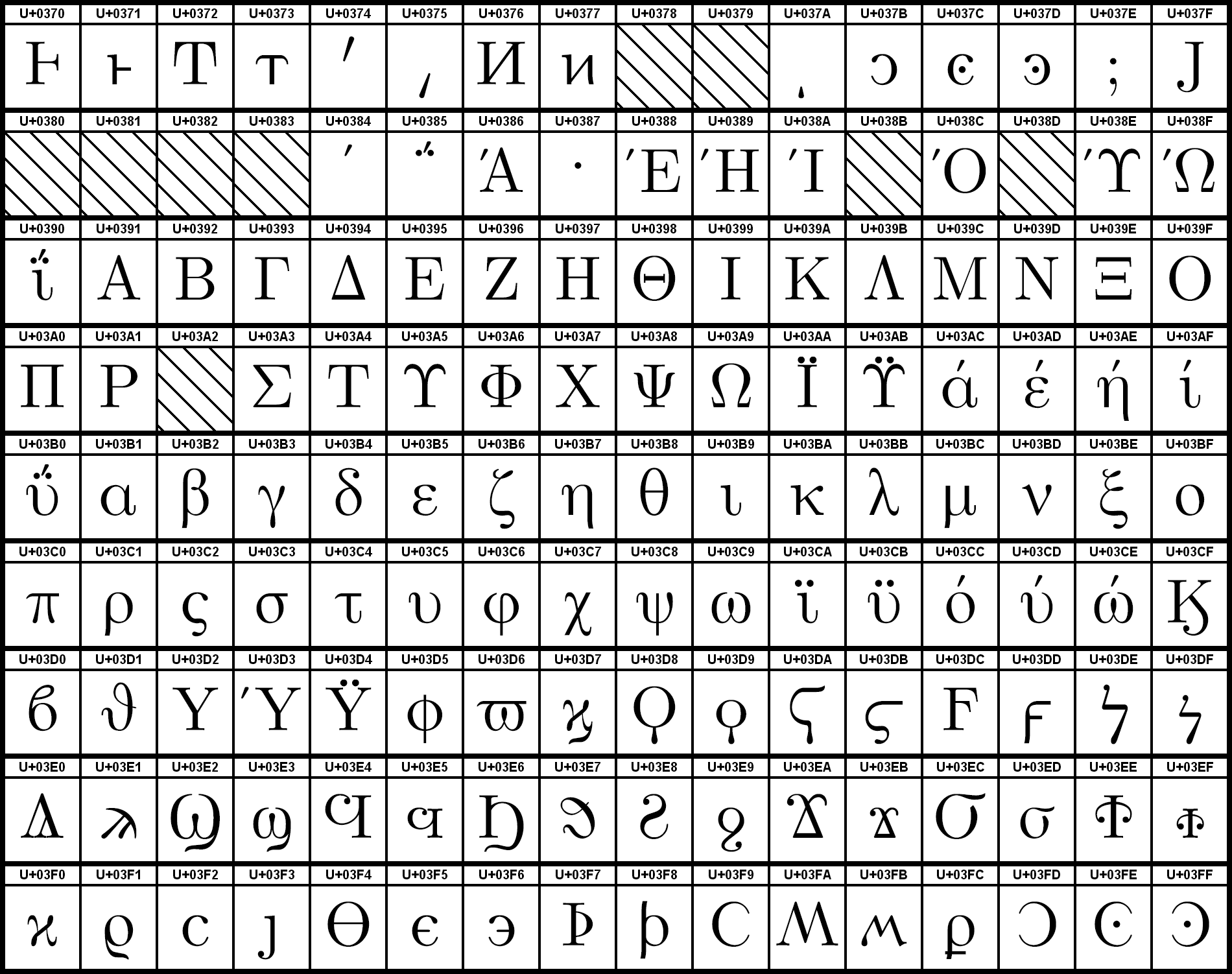
Graphical representation of the Greek and Coptic Unicode block

Greek and Coptic is the Unicode block for representing modern (monotonic) Greek. It was originally also used for writing Coptic, using the similar Greek letters in addition to the uniquely Coptic additions. Beginning with version 4.1 of the Unicode Standard, a separate Coptic block has been included in Unicode, allowing for mixed Greek/Coptic text that is stylistically contrastive, as is convention in scholarly works. Writing polytonic Greek requires the use of combining characters or the precomposed vowel + tone characters in the Greek Extended character block.

Its block name in Unicode 1.0 was simply Greek, although Coptic letters were already included.

== Block ==
Points were reserved for the uppercase forms of ΐ, ΰ and ς. While letter-diacritic combinations such as ΐ and ΰ are no longer accepted by Unicode, a capital ς remains a theoretical possibility. There is in addition room for three additional casing pairs, or for capital forms of letters such as lunate ϵ and ϶.

Greek and Coptic^{[1]}^{[2]} Official Unicode Consortium code chart (PDF)
| | 0 | 1 | 2 | 3 | 4 | 5 | 6 | 7 | 8 | 9 | A | B | C | D | E | F |
| U+037x | Ͱ | ͱ | Ͳ | ͳ | ʹ | ͵ | Ͷ | ͷ | | | ͺ | ͻ | ͼ | ͽ | ; | Ϳ |
| U+038x | | | | | ΄ | ΅ | Ά | · | Έ | Ή | Ί | | Ό | | Ύ | Ώ |
| U+039x | ΐ | Α | Β | Γ | Δ | Ε | Ζ | Η | Θ | Ι | Κ | Λ | Μ | Ν | Ξ | Ο |
| U+03Ax | Π | Ρ | | Σ | Τ | Υ | Φ | Χ | Ψ | Ω | Ϊ | Ϋ | ά | έ | ή | ί |
| U+03Bx | ΰ | α | β | γ | δ | ε | ζ | η | θ | ι | κ | λ | μ | ν | ξ | ο |
| U+03Cx | π | ρ | ς | σ | τ | υ | φ | χ | ψ | ω | ϊ | ϋ | ό | ύ | ώ | Ϗ |
| U+03Dx | ϐ | ϑ | ϒ | ϓ | ϔ | ϕ | ϖ | ϗ | Ϙ | ϙ | Ϛ | ϛ | Ϝ | ϝ | Ϟ | ϟ |
| U+03Ex | Ϡ | ϡ | Ϣ | ϣ | Ϥ | ϥ | Ϧ | ϧ | Ϩ | ϩ | Ϫ | ϫ | Ϭ | ϭ | Ϯ | ϯ |
| U+03Fx | ϰ | ϱ | ϲ | ϳ | ϴ | ϵ | ϶ | Ϸ | ϸ | Ϲ | Ϻ | ϻ | ϼ | Ͻ | Ͼ | Ͽ |
Notes: 1. As of Unicode version 17.0; 2. Grey areas indicate non-assigned code points

== History ==
In Unicode 1.0.1, a number of changes were made to this block in order to make Unicode 1.0.1 a proper subset of ISO 10646.

- The small stigma, digamma, koppa and sampi were withdrawn for further study. These characters were added back in for Unicode 3.0.0.
- The non-spacing dasia pneumata, psili pneumata and tonos were merged with non-spacing reversed comma above, comma above and vertical line above in the Combining Diacritical Marks block. The last was replaced by the spacing tonos, while in Unicode 5.1.0 the former two were replaced by the small heta and the capital archaic sampi.
- The non-spacing iota below and diaeresis tonos were renamed and moved to the Combining Diacritical Marks block. The latter was replaced by the spacing diaeresis tonos, while the former was replaced by the capital heta in Unicode 5.1.0.
- The Greek question mark, the upper and lower numeral signs and the aforementioned spacing tonos and diaeresis tonos, as well as the spacing iota below were moved to new positions within the block. They were replaced by the kai, or Greek &, (in Unicode 3.0.0), the capital and small archaic koppa (3.2.0), the yot (1.1.0), an alternative capital theta and the lunate epsilon (both 3.1.0) respectively.

The following Unicode-related documents record the purpose and process of defining specific characters in the Greek and Coptic block:

| Version | Final code points (Note: Proposed code points and characters names may differ from final code points and names) | Count | UTC ID | L2 ID | WG2 ID | Document |
|---|---|---|---|---|---|---|
| 1.0.0 | U+0374..0375, 037A, 037E, 0384..0386, 0388..038A, 038C, 038E..03A1, 03A3..03CE, 03D0..03D6, 03DA, 03DC, 03DE, 03E0, 03E2..03F0 | 101 | | | | (to be determined) |
| 1.0.0 | U+0374..0375, 037A, 037E, 0384..0386, 0388..038A, 038C, 038E..03A1, 03A3..03CE, 03D0..03D6, 03DA, 03DC, 03DE, 03E0, 03E2..03F0 | 101 | | L2/06-386 | | Davis, Mark (2006-11-09), Properties not preserving canonical equivalence |
| 1.0.0 | U+0374..0375, 037A, 037E, 0384..0386, 0388..038A, 038C, 038E..03A1, 03A3..03CE, 03D0..03D6, 03DA, 03DC, 03DE, 03E0, 03E2..03F0 | 101 | | L2/07-015 | | Moore, Lisa (2007-02-08), "UCD Canonical Check (B.14.9) [U+0374]", UTC #110 Minutes |
| 1.0.0 | U+0374..0375, 037A, 037E, 0384..0386, 0388..038A, 038C, 038E..03A1, 03A3..03CE, 03D0..03D6, 03DA, 03DC, 03DE, 03E0, 03E2..03F0 | 101 | | L2/07-071 | | Davis, Mark (2007-02-08), UCD Canonical Check |
| 1.0.0 | U+03F1 | 1 | UTC/1991-048B | | | Whistler, Ken (1991-03-27), "Alternate Rho", Draft Minutes from the UTC meeting #46 day 2, 3/27 at Apple |
| 1.0.0 | U+03F2 | 1 | UTC/1991-048B | | | Whistler, Ken (1991-03-27), "Lunate Sigma", Draft Minutes from the UTC meeting #46 day 2, 3/27 at Apple |
| 1.1 | U+0387, 03F3 | 2 | | | | (to be determined) |
| 1.1 | U+0387, 03F3 | 2 | | L2/06-386 | | Davis, Mark (2006-11-09), Properties not preserving canonical equivalence |
| 1.1 | U+0387, 03F3 | 2 | | L2/07-015 | | Moore, Lisa (2007-02-08), "UCD Canonical Check (B.14.9) [U+0387]", UTC #110 Minutes |
| 1.1 | U+0387, 03F3 | 2 | | L2/07-071 | | Davis, Mark (2007-02-08), UCD Canonical Check |
| 3.0 | U+03D7, 03DB, 03DD, 03DF, 03E1 | 5 | | L2/98-210 | N1743 | Everson, Michael (1998-05-25), Additional Greek characters for the UCS |
| 3.0 | U+03D7, 03DB, 03DD, 03DF, 03E1 | 5 | | L2/98-281R (pdf, html) | | Aliprand, Joan (1998-07-31), "Greek characters (IV.C.2)", Unconfirmed Minutes – UTC #77 & NCITS Subgroup L2 # 174 JOINT MEETING, Redmond, WA -- July 29-31, 1998 |
| 3.0 | U+03D7, 03DB, 03DD, 03DF, 03E1 | 5 | | L2/98-292R (pdf, html, Figure 1) | | "2.2", Comments on proposals to add characters from ISO standards developed by ISO/TC 46/SC 4, 1998-08-19 |
| 3.0 | U+03D7, 03DB, 03DD, 03DF, 03E1 | 5 | | L2/98-292 | N1840 | "2.2", Comments on proposals to add characters from ISO standards developed by ISO/TC 46/SC 4, 1998-08-25 |
| 3.0 | U+03D7, 03DB, 03DD, 03DF, 03E1 | 5 | | L2/98-293 | N1885 | "2.3", Comments on proposals to add various characters to ISO/IEC 10646, 1998-08-25 |
| 3.0 | U+03D7, 03DB, 03DD, 03DF, 03E1 | 5 | | L2/98-301 | N1847 | Everson, Michael (1998-09-12), Responses to NCITS/L2 and Unicode Consortium comments on numerous proposals |
| 3.0 | U+03D7, 03DB, 03DD, 03DF, 03E1 | 5 | | L2/98-372 | N1884R2 (pdf, doc) | Whistler, Ken; et al. (1998-09-22), Additional Characters for the UCS |
| 3.0 | U+03D7, 03DB, 03DD, 03DF, 03E1 | 5 | | L2/98-329 | N1920 | Combined PDAM registration and consideration ballot on WD for ISO/IEC 10646-1/Amd. 30, AMENDMENT 30: Additional Latin and other characters, 1998-10-28 |
| 3.0 | U+03D7, 03DB, 03DD, 03DF, 03E1 | 5 | | L2/99-010 | N1903 (pdf, html, doc) | Umamaheswaran, V. S. (1998-12-30), "8.1.5.1", Minutes of WG 2 meeting 35, London, U.K.; 1998-09-21--25 |
| 3.1 | U+03F4..03F5 | 2 | | L2/00-119 (Note: Refer to the history section of the Miscellaneous Mathematical Symbols-B block for additional math-related documents) | N2191R | Whistler, Ken; Freytag, Asmus (2000-04-19), Encoding Additional Mathematical Symbols in Unicode |
| 3.1 | U+03F4..03F5 | 2 | | L2/00-234 | N2203 (rtf, txt) | Umamaheswaran, V. S. (2000-07-21), "8.18", Minutes from the SC2/WG2 meeting in Beijing, 2000-03-21 -- 24 |
| 3.1 | U+03F4..03F5 | 2 | | L2/00-115R2 | | Moore, Lisa (2000-08-08), "Motion 83-M11", Minutes Of UTC Meeting #83 |
| 3.2 | U+03D8..03D9, 03F6 | 3 | | L2/99-018 | N1938 | Everson, Michael (1998-12-12), On GREEK LETTER KOPPA |
| 3.2 | U+03D8..03D9, 03F6 | 3 | | L2/99-077.1 | N1975 | Irish Comments on SC 2 N 3210, 1999-01-20 |
| 3.2 | U+03D8..03D9, 03F6 | 3 | | L2/99-054R | | Aliprand, Joan (1999-06-21), "Greek Letter Koppa", Approved Minutes from the UTC/L2 meeting in Palo Alto, February 3-5, 1999 |
| 3.2 | U+03D8..03D9, 03F6 | 3 | | L2/00-119 | N2191R | Whistler, Ken; Freytag, Asmus (2000-04-19), Encoding Additional Mathematical Symbols in Unicode |
| 3.2 | U+03D8..03D9, 03F6 | 3 | | L2/00-234 | N2203 (rtf, txt) | Umamaheswaran, V. S. (2000-07-21), "8.18", Minutes from the SC2/WG2 meeting in Beijing, 2000-03-21 -- 24 |
| 3.2 | U+03D8..03D9, 03F6 | 3 | | L2/00-115R2 | | Moore, Lisa (2000-08-08), "Motion 83-M11", Minutes Of UTC Meeting #83 |
| 3.2 | U+03D8..03D9, 03F6 | 3 | | L2/01-050 | N2253 | Umamaheswaran, V. S. (2001-01-21), "RESOLUTION M39.24", Minutes of the SC2/WG2 meeting in Athens, September 2000 |
| 4.0 | U+03F7..03F8 | 2 | | L2/01-007 | | Bunz, Carl-Martin (2000-12-21), "Bactrian", Iranianist Meeting Report: Symposium on Encoding Iranian Scripts in Unicode |
| 4.0 | U+03F7..03F8 | 2 | | L2/02-009 | | Bunz, Carl-Martin (2001-11-23), "Bactrian", 2nd Iranian Meeting Report |
| 4.0 | U+03F7..03F8 | 2 | | L2/02-056 | N2411 | Everson, Michael (2002-01-30), Proposal to add two Greek letters for Bactrian to the UCS |
| 4.0 | U+03F7..03F8 | 2 | | L2/02-166R2 | | Moore, Lisa (2002-08-09), "Scripts and New Characters - Bactrian", UTC #91 Minutes, "The UTC accepts two Greek characters for use in Bactrian" |
| 4.0 | U+03F9 | 1 | | L2/02-314R (Note: See also L2/02-031, L2/02-053, L2/02-273, and L2/02-287) | N2512 | Pantelia, Maria (2002-08-21), Proposal to add the Greek Capital Lunate Sigma Symbol to the UCS |
| 4.0 | U+03FA..03FB | 2 | | L2/02-313R2 | N2522 | Pantelia, Maria (2002-11-07), Proposal to encode the Archaic Greek Letter San and Greek Small Letter San in the UCS |
| 4.0 | U+03FA..03FB | 2 | | L2/04-034 | | March, Jeremy; Kirk, Peter; Rourke, Patrick; Anderson, Deborah (2004-01-23), Request to Change Greek Collation Order for SAN |
| 4.1 | U+03FC | 1 | | L2/03-157 | | Pantelia, Maria (2003-05-19), Additional Beta Code Characters not in Unicode (WIP) |
| 4.1 | U+03FC | 1 | | L2/03-188R | N2612-5 | Pantelia, Maria (2003-06-11), Proposal to encode the Greek Rho with Stroke Symbol in the UCS |
| 4.1 | U+03FD..03FF | 3 | | L2/02-031 | | Anderson, Deborah (2002-01-21), TLG Miscellanea Proposal |
| 4.1 | U+03FD..03FF | 3 | | L2/02-033 | | Anderson, Deborah (2002-01-21), TLG Unicode Proposal (draft) |
| 4.1 | U+03FD..03FF | 3 | | L2/02-053 | | Anderson, Deborah (2002-02-04), Description of TLG Documents |
| 4.1 | U+03FD..03FF | 3 | | L2/02-273 | | Pantelia, Maria (2002-07-31), TLG Unicode Proposal |
| 4.1 | U+03FD..03FF | 3 | | L2/02-287 | | Pantelia, Maria (2002-08-09), Proposal Summary Form accompanying TLG Unicode Proposal (L2/02-273) |
| 4.1 | U+03FD..03FF | 3 | | L2/02-312R | | Pantelia, Maria (2002-11-07), Proposal to encode additional Greek editorial and punctuation characters in the UCS |
| 4.1 | U+03FD..03FF | 3 | | L2/03-324 | N2642 | Pantelia, Maria (2003-10-06), Proposal to encode additional Greek editorial and punctuation characters in the UCS |
| 5.0 | U+037B..037D | 3 | | L2/05-076 | | Davis, Mark (2005-02-10), Stability of Case Folding |
| 5.0 | U+037B..037D | 3 | | | N2942 | Freytag, Asmus; Whistler, Ken (2005-08-12), Proposal to add nine lowercase characters |
| 5.0 | U+037B..037D | 3 | | L2/05-108R | | Moore, Lisa (2005-08-26), "Stability of Case Folding (B.14.2)", UTC #103 Minutes |
| 5.0 | U+037B..037D | 3 | | | N2953 (pdf, doc) | Umamaheswaran, V. S. (2006-02-16), "M47.5c, M47.5d, M47.5e", Unconfirmed minutes of WG 2 meeting 47, Sophia Antipolis, France; 2005-09-12/15 |
| 5.1 | U+0370..0373, 0376..0377 | 6 | | L2/04-388 | | Nicholas, Nick (2004-11-10), Proposal to add Greek Letter Lowercase Heta and Greek Letter Capital Heta to the UCS |
| 5.1 | U+0370..0373, 0376..0377 | 6 | | L2/04-389 | | Nicholas, Nick (2004-11-10), Epigraphical Greek Letters: Request for preliminary opinion |
| 5.1 | U+0370..0373, 0376..0377 | 6 | | L2/05-002 | | Nicholas, Nick (2005-01-01), Proposal to add Greek Letter Lowercase Heta and Greek Letter Capital Heta (Updated fonts 2005-04-28) |
| 5.1 | U+0370..0373, 0376..0377 | 6 | | L2/05-003R | N2946 | Nicholas, Nick (2005-01-01), Proposal to add Greek epigraphical letters |
| 5.1 | U+0370..0373, 0376..0377 | 6 | | L2/05-054 | | Anderson, Deborah (2005-01-31), Feedback on Proposals for Tack Hetas and Greek Epigraphical Letters (L2/05-002, L2/05-003) |
| 5.1 | U+0370..0373, 0376..0377 | 6 | | L2/05-098 | | Nicholas, Nick (2005-04-03), Proposal to add Greek epigraphical characters to the UCS |
| 5.1 | U+0370..0373, 0376..0377 | 6 | | L2/05-108R | | Moore, Lisa (2005-08-26), "Greek Epigraphical Letters (C.10)", UTC #103 Minutes |
| 5.1 | U+0370..0373, 0376..0377 | 6 | | | N2953 (pdf, doc) | Umamaheswaran, V. S. (2006-02-16), "7.4.3", Unconfirmed minutes of WG 2 meeting 47, Sophia Antipolis, France; 2005-09-12/15 |
| 5.1 | U+0370..0373, 0376..0377 | 6 | | | N3153 (pdf, doc) | Umamaheswaran, V. S. (2007-02-16), "M49.1c [U+0373]", Unconfirmed minutes of WG 2 meeting 49 AIST, Akihabara, Tokyo, Japan; 2006-09-25/29 |
| 5.1 | U+03CF | 1 | | L2/06-266 | N3122 | Everson, Michael (2006-08-06), Proposal to add Latin letters and a Greek symbol to the UCS |
| 5.1 | U+03CF | 1 | | L2/06-231 | | Moore, Lisa (2006-08-17), "C.16", UTC #108 Minutes |
| 5.1 | U+03CF | 1 | | | N3153 (pdf, doc) | Umamaheswaran, V. S. (2007-02-16), "M49.3", Unconfirmed minutes of WG 2 meeting 49 AIST, Akihabara, Tokyo, Japan; 2006-09-25/29 |
| 7.0 | U+037F | 1 | | L2/10-474 | N3997 | Bobeck, Michael (2010-12-12), Proposal to encode GREEK CAPITAL LETTER YOT |
| 7.0 | U+037F | 1 | | L2/11-016 | | Moore, Lisa (2011-02-15), "C.9", UTC #126 / L2 #223 Minutes |
| 7.0 | U+037F | 1 | | | N4103 | "11.2.8 Greek Capital Letter YOT", Unconfirmed minutes of WG 2 meeting 58, 2012-01-03 |

== See also ==
- Phonetic symbols in Unicode
