= Coptic script =

Script used for writing the Coptic language

- Script type: Alphabet
- Period: 2nd century AD to present (in Coptic liturgy)
- Direction: Left-to-right
- Languages: Coptic, Blemmyan, Nubian languages

Related scripts
- Parent systems: Egyptian hieroglyphs: Proto-Sinaitic; Phoenician alphabet; Greek script augmented by Demotic; Coptic script
- Child systems: Old Nubian

ISO 15924
- ISO 15924: Copt (204), Coptic

Unicode
- Unicode alias: Coptic
- Unicode range: U+2C80–U+2CFF Coptic; U+0370–U+03FF Greek and Coptic; U+102E0–U+102FF Coptic Epact Numbers

The Coptic script is the script used for writing the Coptic language, the most recent development of Egyptian. The repertoire of glyphs is based on the uncial Greek alphabet, augmented by letters borrowed from the Egyptian Demotic. It was the first alphabetic script used for the Egyptian language. There are several Coptic alphabets, as the script varies greatly among the various dialects and eras of the Coptic language.

== History ==
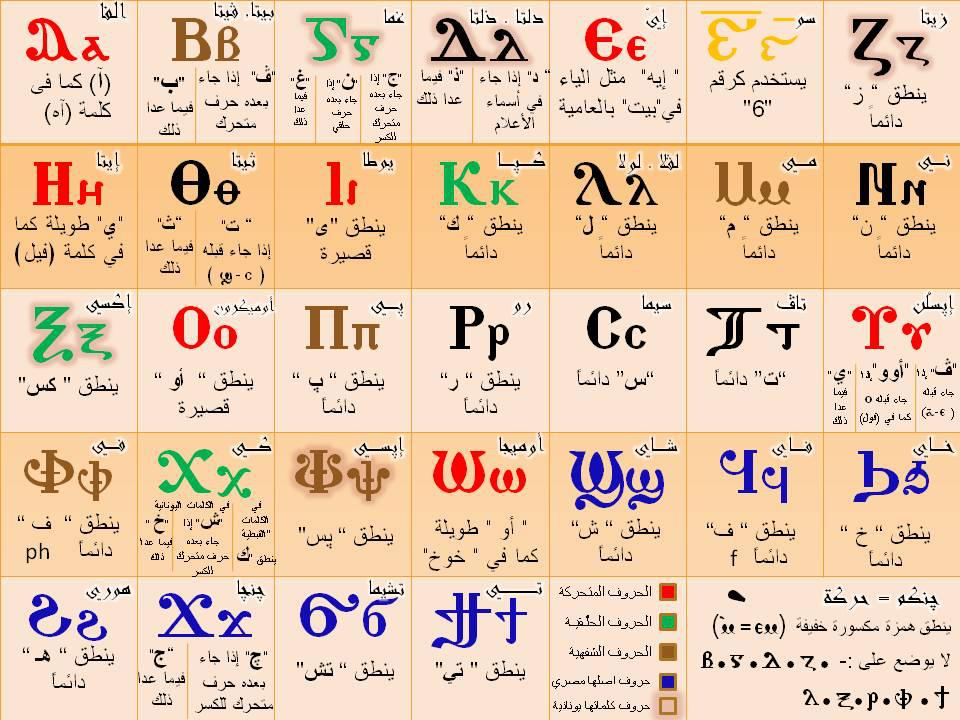
The Coptic alphabet

The Coptic script has a long history going back to the Ptolemaic Kingdom, when the Greek alphabet was used to transcribe Demotic texts, with the aim of recording the correct pronunciation of Demotic. As early as the sixth century BC and as late as the second century AD, an entire series of pre-Christian religious texts were written in what scholars term Old Coptic, Egyptian language texts written in the Greek alphabet.

In contrast to Old Coptic, seven additional Coptic letters were derived from Demotic, and many of these (though not all) are used in “true” form of Coptic writing. Coptic texts are associated with Christianity, Gnosticism, and Manichaeism.

With the spread of early Christianity in Egypt, knowledge of Egyptian hieroglyphs was lost by the late third century, as well as Demotic script slightly later, making way for a writing system more closely associated with the Coptic Orthodox Church. By the fourth century, the Coptic script was "standardized", particularly for the Sahidic dialect. (There are a number of differences between the alphabets as used in the various dialects in Coptic).

Coptic is not generally used today except by the members of the Coptic Orthodox Church to write their religious texts. All the Gnostic codices found at Nag Hammadi used the Coptic script.

The most common Coptic dialect written today as a liturgical language for the Coptic Orthodox and Coptic Catholic Churches is the Bohairic dialect.

The Old Nubian alphabet—used to write Old Nubian, a Nilo-Saharan language—is an uncial variant of the Coptic script, with additional characters borrowed from the Greek and Meroitic scripts.

== Form ==
The Coptic script was the first Egyptian writing system to indicate vowels, making Coptic documents invaluable for the interpretation of earlier Egyptian texts. Some Egyptian syllables had sonorants but no vowels; in Sahidic, these were written in Coptic with a line above the entire syllable. Various scribal schools made limited use of diacritics: some used an apostrophe as a word divider and to mark clitics, a function of determinatives in logographic Egyptian; others used diereses over ⲓ and ⲩ to show that these started a new syllable, others a circumflex over any vowel for the same purpose.

The Coptic script's glyphs are largely based on the Greek alphabet, which is another help in interpreting older Egyptian texts. It has 24 letters of Greek origin; 6 or 7 more were retained from Demotic, depending on the dialect (6 in Sahidic, another each in Bohairic and Akhmimic). In addition to the alphabetic letters, the letter ϯ stood for the syllable /ti/ or /di/.

As the Coptic script is a variant of the Greek alphabet, with a few added letters, it can be used to write Greek without any transliteration schemes. Latin equivalents would include the Icelandic alphabet (which likewise has added letters), or the Fraktur alphabet (which has distinctive forms). While initially unified with the Greek alphabet by Unicode, a proposal was later accepted to separate it, with the proposal noting that Coptic is never written using modern Greek letter-forms (unlike German, which may be written with Fraktur or Antiqua letter-forms), and that the Coptic letter-forms have closer mutual legibility with the Greek-based letters incorporated into the separately encoded Cyrillic alphabet than with the forms used in modern Greek. Because Coptic lowercases are usually small-caps forms of the capitals, a Greek would have little trouble reading Coptic letters, but Copts would struggle more with many of the Greek letters.

== Letters ==
These are the letters that are used for writing the Coptic language. Coptic did not originally have case distinctions—they are a modern convention, as is the case with other classical languages like Latin.

Uppercase (image)	Lowercase (image)	Uppercase (unicode)	Lowercase (unicode)	Numeric value	Greek equiv.	Latin translit.	Sahidic pron.	Bohairic pron.	Late Coptic pron.	Greco-Bohairic pron.
		Ⲁ	ⲁ	1	Α, α	A, a	/a/		/æ/, /ɑ/	/ä/
		Ⲃ	ⲃ	2	Β, β	B, b	/β/	/β/ (final [b])	/w/ (final [b]) (Note: Ⲃ seemed to have retained a [β] intervocalically in Late Coptic.)	/v/, (/b/ before a consonant, at the end of a word, or in a name)
		Ⲅ	ⲅ	3	Γ, γ	G, g	/k/ (marked Greek words)	—	/g/, (/ɣ/ before ⲁ, ⲟ, or ⲱ)	/ɣ/, /g/ (before /e̞/ or /i/), /ŋ/ (before /g/ or /k/)
		Ⲇ	ⲇ	4	Δ, δ	D, d	/t/ (marked Greek words)	—	/d/ (marked Greek words)	/ð/, (/d/ in a name)
		Ⲉ	ⲉ	5	Ε, ε	E, e	/ɛ/, /ə/ (ⲉⲓ = /i/, /j/)	/ɛ/, /ə/ (ⲓⲉ = /e/)	/æ/, /ɑ/ (ⲓⲉ = /e/)	/e̞/
		Ⲋ	ⲋ	6	Ϛ, ϛ	(none)	(none)			
		Ⲍ	ⲍ	7	Ζ, ζ	Z, z	/s/ (marked Greek words)	—	/z/ (marked Greek words)	/z/
		Ⲏ	ⲏ	8	Η, η	Ē, ē	/e/	/e/	/æ/, /ɑ/, /ɪ/	/iː/
		Ⲑ	ⲑ	9	Θ, θ	Th, th	/th/	/tʰ/	/t/	/θ/
		Ⲓ	ⲓ	10	Ι, ι	I, i	/iː/, /j/	/i/, /j/, /ə/ (ⲓⲉ = /e/)	/ɪ/, /j/ (ⲓⲉ = /e/)	/i/, /j/ (before vowels), /ɪ/ (after vowels to form diphthongs)
		Ⲕ	ⲕ	20	Κ, κ	K, k	/k/			
		Ⲗ	ⲗ	30	Λ, λ	L, l	/l/			
		Ⲙ	ⲙ	40	Μ, μ	M, m	/m/			
		Ⲛ	ⲛ	50	Ν, ν	N, n	/n/			
		Ⲝ	ⲝ	60	Ξ, ξ	Ks, ks	/ks/ (only in Greek loanwords)			/ks/, [e̞ks] (usually following a consonant, or sometimes when starting a word)
		Ⲟ	ⲟ	70	Ο, ο	O, o	/ɔ/ (ⲟⲩ = /u/, /w/)		/o/ (ⲟⲩ = /u/, /w/)	/o̞/ (ⲟⲩ = /u/)
		Ⲡ	ⲡ	80	Π, π	P, p	/p/		/b/	/p/
		Ⲣ	ⲣ	100	Ρ, ρ	R, r	/ɾ/~/r/			
		Ⲥ	ⲥ	200	Σ, σ, ς	S, s	/s/			
		Ⲧ	ⲧ	300	Τ, τ	T, t	/t/	/t/	/d/ (final [t])	/t/
		Ⲩ	ⲩ	400	Υ, υ	U, u	/w/ (ⲟⲩ = /u/, /w/)		/ɪ/, /w/ (ⲟⲩ = /u/, /w/)	/i/, /w/ (between "ⲟ" and another vowel except "ⲱ"), /v/ (after /ɑ/ (ⲁ or /e̞/ (ⲉ)), /u/ (digraph "ⲟⲩ")
		Ⲫ	ⲫ	500	Φ, φ	Ph, ph	/ph/	/pʰ/	/b/~/f/	/f/
		Ⲭ	ⲭ	600	Χ, χ	Kh, kh	/kh/	/kʰ/	/k/	/k/ (if the word is Coptic in origin), /x/ (if the word is Greek in origin), /ç/ (if the word is Greek in origin but before /e̞/ or /i/)
		Ⲯ	ⲯ	700	Ψ, ψ	Ps, ps			[bs] (only in Greek loanwords)	[ps], [e̞ps] (usually following a consonant)
		Ⲱ	ⲱ	800	Ω, ω	Ō, ō	/o/	/o/	/oː/	/o̞ː/
		Ϣ	ϣ	—	(none)	Š, š / Sh, sh	/ʃ/			
		Ϥ	ϥ	90	Ϙ, ϙ (numerical value)	F, f	/f/			
		Ϧ	ϧ	—	(none)	X, x / H̱, ẖ	NA	/x/		
		Ⳉ	ⳉ	—	(none)		only used in Akhmimic for /x/. No name is recorded.			
		Ϩ	ϩ	—	(none)	H, h	/h/			
		Ϫ	ϫ	—	(none)	J, j	/t͡ʃ/	/t͡ʃ/	/d͡ʒ/ (Note: Ϫ and ϭ seemed to have merged in Late Coptic into one phoneme, /ʃ/, with [d͡ʒ] intervocalically.)	/g/, /d͡ʒ/ (before /e̞/ or /i/)
		Ϭ	ϭ	—	(none)	C, c / Č, č	/kʲ/	/t͡ʃʰ/	/ʃ/	/tʃ/, [e̞tʃ] (usually following a consonant)
		Ϯ	ϯ	—	Τι, τι	Ti, ti	/ti/	/ti/ (Note: When part of the digraph ϯⲉ, it is pronounced [de] in Bohairic.)	/di/	/ti/
		Ⳁ	ⳁ	900	Ϡ, ϡ (numerical value)	(none)	(none)			

=== Letters derived from Demotic ===
Old Coptic had a large number of Demotic Egyptian characters, including some logograms. This was reduced to seven such characters, used for sounds not covered by the Greek alphabet (plus their modern lowercase forms):

Hieroglyph		Hieratic		Demotic		Coptic	Translit.	Late Coptic pron.
SA	→		→		→	Ϣ	š	/ʃ/
f	→		→		→	Ϥ	f	/f/
M12	→		→		→	Ϧ	x	/x/
F18 Y1	→		→		→	Ϩ	h	/h/
U29	→		→		→	Ϫ	j	/d͡ʒ/
k	→		→		→	Ϭ	c	/ʃ/
D37 t	→		→		→	Ϯ	di	/di/

=== Numerals ===
Coptic numerals are an alphabetic numeral system in which numbers are indicated with letters of the alphabet, such as ⲫ for 500. The numerical value of the letters is based on Greek numerals. Sometimes numerical use is distinguished from text with a continuous overline above the letters, as with Greek and Cyrillic numerals.

== Sample text ==
Below is the Lord's prayer in the Coptic language and script:

ⲡⲉⲛⲓⲱⲧ‌ ‌ⲉⲧϧⲉⲛ‌ ‌ⲛⲓⲫⲏⲟⲩⲓ‌ ‌ⲙⲁⲣⲉϥⲧⲟⲩⲃⲟ‌ ‌ⲛ̀ϫⲉ‌ ‌ⲡⲉⲕⲣⲁⲛ‌ ‌ⲙⲁⲣⲉⲥⲓ̀‌ ‌ⲛ̀ϫⲉ‌ ‌ⲧⲉⲕⲙⲉⲧⲟⲩⲣⲟ‌ ‌ⲡⲉⲧⲉϩⲛⲁⲕ‌ ‌ⲙⲁⲣⲉϥϣⲱⲡⲓ‌ ‌ⲙ̀ⲫ̀ⲣⲏϯ‌ ‌ϧⲉⲛ‌ ‌ⲧ̀ⲫⲉ‌ ‌ⲛⲉⲙ‌ ‌ϩⲓϫⲉⲛ‌ ‌ⲡⲓⲕⲁϩⲓ‌ ‌ⲡⲉⲛⲱⲓⲕ‌ ‌ⲛ̀ⲧⲉ‌ ‌ⲣⲁⲥϯ‌ ‌ⲙⲏⲓϥ‌ ‌ⲛⲁⲛ‌ ‌ⲙ̀ⲫⲟⲟⲩ‌ ‌ⲟⲩⲟϩ‌ ‌ⲭⲁ‌ ‌ⲛⲏⲉⲧⲉⲣⲟⲛ‌ ‌ⲛⲁⲛ‌ ‌ⲉ̀ⲃⲟⲗ‌ ‌ⲙ̀ⲫ̀ⲣⲏϯ‌ ‌ϩⲱⲛ‌ ‌ⲛ̀ⲧⲉⲛⲭⲱ‌ ‌ⲉ̀ⲃⲟⲗ‌ ‌ⲛ̀ⲛⲏⲉⲧⲉ‌ ‌ⲟⲩⲟⲛ‌ ‌ⲛ̀ⲧⲁⲛ‌ ‌ⲉ̀ⲣⲱⲟⲩ‌ ‌ⲟⲩⲟϩ‌ ‌ⲙ̀ⲡⲉⲣⲉⲛⲧⲉⲛ‌ ‌ⲉ̀ϧⲟⲩⲛ‌ ‌ⲉ̀ⲡⲓⲣⲁⲥⲙⲟⲥ‌ ‌ⲁⲗⲗⲁ‌ ‌ⲛⲁϩⲙⲉⲛ‌ ‌ⲉ̀ⲃⲟⲗϩⲁ‌ ‌ⲡⲓⲡⲉⲧϩⲱⲟⲩ‌ ‌ϧⲉⲛ‌ ‌Ⲡⲓⲭⲣⲓⲥⲧⲟⲥ‌ ‌Ⲓⲏⲥⲟⲩⲥ‌ ‌ⲡⲉⲛϭⲟⲓⲥ‌ ‌ϫⲉ‌ ‌ⲑⲱⲕ‌ ‌ⲧⲉ‌ ‌ϯⲙⲉⲧⲟⲩⲣⲟ‌ ‌ⲛⲉⲙ‌ ‌ϯϫⲟⲙ‌ ‌ⲛⲉⲙ‌ ‌ⲡⲓⲱⲟⲩ‌ ‌ϣⲁ‌ ‌ⲉⲛⲉϩ‌ ‌ⲁⲙⲏⲛ‌

== Unicode ==
In Unicode, most Coptic letters formerly shared codepoints with similar Greek letters, but a disunification was accepted for version 4.1, which appeared in 2005. The new Coptic block is U+2C80 to U+2CFF. Most fonts contained in mainstream operating systems use a distinctive Byzantine style for this block. The Greek block includes seven Coptic letters (U+03E2–U+03EF highlighted below) derived from Demotic, and these need to be included in any complete implementation of Coptic.

Greek and Coptic^{[1]}^{[2]} Official Unicode Consortium code chart (PDF)
	0	1	2	3	4	5	6	7	8	9	A	B	C	D	E	F
U+037x	Ͱ	ͱ	Ͳ	ͳ	ʹ	͵	Ͷ	ͷ			ͺ	ͻ	ͼ	ͽ	;	Ϳ
U+038x					΄	΅	Ά	·	Έ	Ή	Ί		Ό		Ύ	Ώ
U+039x	ΐ	Α	Β	Γ	Δ	Ε	Ζ	Η	Θ	Ι	Κ	Λ	Μ	Ν	Ξ	Ο
U+03Ax	Π	Ρ		Σ	Τ	Υ	Φ	Χ	Ψ	Ω	Ϊ	Ϋ	ά	έ	ή	ί
U+03Bx	ΰ	α	β	γ	δ	ε	ζ	η	θ	ι	κ	λ	μ	ν	ξ	ο
U+03Cx	π	ρ	ς	σ	τ	υ	φ	χ	ψ	ω	ϊ	ϋ	ό	ύ	ώ	Ϗ
U+03Dx	ϐ	ϑ	ϒ	ϓ	ϔ	ϕ	ϖ	ϗ	Ϙ	ϙ	Ϛ	ϛ	Ϝ	ϝ	Ϟ	ϟ
U+03Ex	Ϡ	ϡ	Ϣ	ϣ	Ϥ	ϥ	Ϧ	ϧ	Ϩ	ϩ	Ϫ	ϫ	Ϭ	ϭ	Ϯ	ϯ
U+03Fx	ϰ	ϱ	ϲ	ϳ	ϴ	ϵ	϶	Ϸ	ϸ	Ϲ	Ϻ	ϻ	ϼ	Ͻ	Ͼ	Ͽ
Notes 1.As of Unicode version 17.0 2.Grey areas indicate non-assigned code points

Coptic^{[1]}^{[2]} Official Unicode Consortium code chart (PDF)
	0	1	2	3	4	5	6	7	8	9	A	B	C	D	E	F
U+2C8x	Ⲁ	ⲁ	Ⲃ	ⲃ	Ⲅ	ⲅ	Ⲇ	ⲇ	Ⲉ	ⲉ	Ⲋ	ⲋ	Ⲍ	ⲍ	Ⲏ	ⲏ
U+2C9x	Ⲑ	ⲑ	Ⲓ	ⲓ	Ⲕ	ⲕ	Ⲗ	ⲗ	Ⲙ	ⲙ	Ⲛ	ⲛ	Ⲝ	ⲝ	Ⲟ	ⲟ
U+2CAx	Ⲡ	ⲡ	Ⲣ	ⲣ	Ⲥ	ⲥ	Ⲧ	ⲧ	Ⲩ	ⲩ	Ⲫ	ⲫ	Ⲭ	ⲭ	Ⲯ	ⲯ
U+2CBx	Ⲱ	ⲱ	Ⲳ	ⲳ	Ⲵ	ⲵ	Ⲷ	ⲷ	Ⲹ	ⲹ	Ⲻ	ⲻ	Ⲽ	ⲽ	Ⲿ	ⲿ
U+2CCx	Ⳁ	ⳁ	Ⳃ	ⳃ	Ⳅ	ⳅ	Ⳇ	ⳇ	Ⳉ	ⳉ	Ⳋ	ⳋ	Ⳍ	ⳍ	Ⳏ	ⳏ
U+2CDx	Ⳑ	ⳑ	Ⳓ	ⳓ	Ⳕ	ⳕ	Ⳗ	ⳗ	Ⳙ	ⳙ	Ⳛ	ⳛ	Ⳝ	ⳝ	Ⳟ	ⳟ
U+2CEx	Ⳡ	ⳡ	Ⳣ	ⳣ	ⳤ	⳥	⳦	⳧	⳨	⳩	⳪	Ⳬ	ⳬ	Ⳮ	ⳮ	⳯
U+2CFx	⳰	⳱	Ⳳ	ⳳ						⳹	⳺	⳻	⳼	⳽	⳾	⳿
Notes: 1. As of Unicode version 17.0; 2.Grey areas indicate non-assigned code points

Coptic Epact Numbers^{[1]}^{[2]} Official Unicode Consortium code chart (PDF)
	0	1	2	3	4	5	6	7	8	9	A	B	C	D	E	F
U+102Ex	𐋠	𐋡	𐋢	𐋣	𐋤	𐋥	𐋦	𐋧	𐋨	𐋩	𐋪	𐋫	𐋬	𐋭	𐋮	𐋯
U+102Fx	𐋰	𐋱	𐋲	𐋳	𐋴	𐋵	𐋶	𐋷	𐋸	𐋹	𐋺	𐋻				
Notes 1.As of Unicode version 17.0 2.Grey areas indicate non-assigned code points

== Diacritics and punctuation ==
These are also included in the Unicode specification.

=== Punctuation ===
- Latin alphabet punctuation (comma, period, question mark, semicolon, colon, hyphen) uses the regular Unicode codepoints for punctuation
- Dicolon: standard colon U+003A
- Middle dot: U+00B7
- En dash: U+2013
- Em dash: U+2014
- Slanted double hyphen: U+2E17

=== Combining diacritics ===
These are codepoints applied after that of the character they modify.

- Combining overstroke: U+0305 (= supralinear stroke)
- Combining character-joining overstroke (from middle of one character to middle of the next): U+035E
- Combining dot under a letter: U+0323
- Combining dot over a letter: U+0307
- Combining acute accent: U+0301
- Combining grave accent: U+0300
- Combining circumflex accent (caret shaped): U+0302
- Combining circumflex (curved shape) or inverted breve above: U+0311
- Combining circumflex as wide inverted breve above joining two letters: U+0361
- Combining diaeresis: U+0308

=== Macrons and overlines ===
Coptic uses U+0304 ◌̄ COMBINING MACRON to indicate syllabic consonants, for example ⲛ̄.

Coptic abbreviations use U+0305 ◌̅ COMBINING OVERLINE to draw a continuous line across the remaining letters of an abbreviated word. It extends from the left edge of the first letter to the right edge of the last letter. For example, ⲡ̅ⲛ̅ⲁ̅, a common abbreviation for ⲡⲛⲉⲩⲙⲁ 'spirit'.

A different kind of overline uses U+FE24 ◌︤ COMBINING MACRON LEFT HALF, U+FE26 ◌︦ COMBINING CONJOINING MACRON, and U+FE25 ◌︥ COMBINING MACRON RIGHT HALF to distinguish the spelling of certain common words or to highlight proper names of divinities and heroes. For this the line begins in the middle of the first letter and continues to the middle of the last letter. A few examples: ⲣ︤ⲙ︥, ϥ︤ⲛ︦ⲧ︥, ⲡ︤ϩ︦ⲣ︦ⲃ︥.

Sometimes numerical use of letters is indicated with a continuous line above them using U+0305 ◌̅ COMBINING OVERLINE as in ⲁ͵ⲱ̅ⲡ̅ⲏ̅ for 1,888 (where "ⲁ͵" is 1,000 and "ⲱ̅ⲡ̅ⲏ̅" is 888). Multiples of 1,000 can be indicated by a continuous double line above using U+033F ◌̿ COMBINING DOUBLE OVERLINE as in ⲁ̿ for 1,000.

== See also ==
- Coptic pronunciation reform
- Institute of Coptic Studies
