= Episema =

Episema can mean:

- Episema (moth), a genus of moths in the family Noctuidae
- an interpretative mark in the musical notation of Gregorian chant
- the plural of episemon, a word for a symbolic badge or for a numeral sign
