= Omicron =

Fifteenth letter of the Greek alphabet

Omicron (US: /ˈoʊmɪkrɒn, ˈɒmɪkrɒn/, UK: / oʊˈmaɪkrɒn/; uppercase Ο, lowercase ο, Greek: όμικρον) is the fifteenth letter of the Greek alphabet. This letter is derived from the Phoenician letter ayin:. In classical Greek, omicron represented the close-mid back rounded vowel [o], in contrast to omega, which represented the open-mid back rounded vowel [ɔː], and the digraph ⟨ου⟩, which represented the long close back rounded vowel [uː]. In modern Greek, both omicron and omega represent the mid back rounded vowel [o̞]. Letters that arose from omicron include Roman O and Cyrillic O and Ю. The name of the letter was originally οὖ (oû [ûː]), but it was later changed to ὂ μικρόν (ò mikrón 'small o') in the Middle Ages to distinguish the letter from omega ⟨ω⟩, whose name means 'big o', as both letters had come to be pronounced [o]. In modern Greek, its name has fused into όμικρον (ómikron). In the system of Greek numerals, it has a value of 70.

== Use ==
In addition to its use as an alphabetic letter, omicron is occasionally used in technical notation, but its use is limited since both upper case and lower case (Ο ο) are indistinguishable from the Latin letter "o" (O o) and difficult to distinguish from the Arabic numeral "zero" (0).

=== Mathematics ===
The big-O symbol was introduced by Paul Bachmann in 1894 and popularized by Edmund Landau in 1909, originally standing for "order of" ("Ordnung") and being thus a Latin letter, was apparently viewed by Donald Knuth in 1976 as a capital Omicron, probably in reference to his definition of the symbol (capital) Omega. Neither Bachmann nor Landau ever call it "Omicron", and the word "Omicron" appears just once in the title of Knuth's paper.

=== Greek numerals ===
There were several systems for writing numbers in Greek; the most common form used in late classical era used omicron (either upper or lower case) to represent the value 70.

More generally, the letter omicron is used to mark the fifteenth ordinal position in any Greek-alphabet marked list. So, for example, in Euclid's Elements, when various points in a geometric diagram are marked with letters, it is effectively the same as marking them with numbers, each letter representing the number of its place in the standard alphabet. (Note: Greek letters-as-numbers used an older Greek alphabet with three more otherwise unused letters, two of them re‑instated in their old locations, early in the alphabet. So positions higher than 5th place (ε) were shifted from the standard alphabet; 5th place was marked with normal fifth letter epsilon (ε). The 6th letter in the conventional alphabet, that normally follows ε is ζ (zeta) but the number 6 was represented a revived ancient letter ′ϝ (digamma), followed by ′ζ which was pushed up from 6th to its ancient position (7th) to represent the number 7. All of the letters after ζ were likewise shifted up one place, until the second ancient letter koppa, (ϙ), was reached; it fell between π and ρ. Every letter from ρ to ω was shifted two places past its conventional ordinal position. Last place coming right after omega (ω, 800) was sampi (ϡ) which represented 900. (From that point, the system restarted, with a new tick-mark, at ͵α. The tick-mark was put in a different place (͵α rather than ′α) to show that the letter represented a multiple of 1,000 rather than 1.)) (Note: From Euclid up to the 19th century, mathematical and technical diagrams were habitually marked sequentially with letters (or numbers), whereas in modern mathematical and scientific diagrams, it is much more common to choose for markers letters that might remind readers of the word used to describe the item in question. For example, Feynman diagrams in particle physics label the positions of particles with the first letter of their name, either in the Latin or Greek alphabet. So p, n, and e , represent the position on a diagram of a proton, neutron, and electron, respectively. The neutrino is represented by ν (Greek "nu"), since the Latin letter "n" is reserved for the neutron.)

=== Astronomy ===
Omicron is used to designate the fifteenth star in a constellation group, its ordinal placement an irregular function of both magnitude and position. Such stars include Omicron Andromedae, Omicron Ceti (Mira), and Omicron Persei.

In Claudius Ptolemy's (c. 100–170) Almagest, tables of sexagesimal numbers 1 ... 59 are represented in the conventional manner for Greek numbers: (Note: Sexagesimal Greek numbers in the Almagest are conventional: 1 2 3 4 5 6 7 8 9 = ′α ′β ′γ ′δ ′ε ′ϝ ′ζ ′η ′θ and 10 20 30 40 50 = ′ι ′κ ′λ ′μ ′ν . Notice that ancient digamma (ϝ) is used for 6 instead of zeta (ζ, which is used for 7) . Adjacent number-letters add, so all the other numbers are made by letter pairs, such as 29 30 31 = ′κθ ′λ ′λα . The number 59 (′νθ) is the largest value used in any single number cell in sexagesimal. That leaves xi (ξ) and the letters following it ( ξ ο π ϙ ρ σ τ υ φ χ ψ ω ϡ ) free for other use: Ptolemy picked ′ο , which normally was used for 70, to mark empty (zero) cells, perhaps because the word for "nothing", οὐδέν starts with an omicron.) ′α ′β ... ′νη ′νθ . Since the letter omicron [which represents 70 (′ο) in the standard system] is not used in sexagesimal, it is repurposed to represent an empty number cell. In some copies, zero cells were just left blank (nothing there, value is zero), but to avoid copying errors, positively marking a zero cell with omicron was preferred, for the same reason that blank cells in modern tables are sometimes filled-in with a long dash (—). Both an omicron and a dash imply that "this is not a mistake, the cell is actually supposed to be empty." By coincidence, the ancient zero-value omicron (′ο) resembles a modern Hindu-Arabic zero (0).

=== Medicine ===
The World Health Organization (WHO) uses the Greek alphabet to describe variants of concern of SARS‑CoV‑2, the virus which causes COVID-19. On November 26, 2021, Omicron was assigned to the B.1.1.529 variant of concern.

== History ==
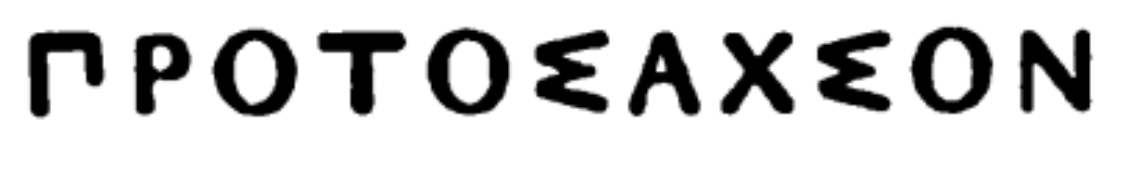
Detail from a fifth-century BCE inscription of Draco's law on homicide, showing the use of O rather than Ω in the phrase "ΠΡΟΤΟΣ ΑΧΣΟΝ" (πρώτος ἄξων, "first axon")

In the earliest Greek inscriptions, only five vowel letters A E I O Y were used. Vowel length was undifferentiated, with O representing both the short vowel /o/ and the long vowels /o:/ and /ɔː/. Later, in classical Attic Greek orthography, the three vowels were represented differently, with O representing short /o/, the new letter Ω representing long /ɔː/, and the so-called "spurious diphthong" OY representing long /o:/.

Although the Greeks took the character O from the Phoenician letter `ayin, they did not borrow its Phoenician name. Instead, the name of the letter O in classical Attic times was simply the long version of its characteric sound: οὖ (pronounced /o:/) (that of Ω was likewise ὦ). (Note: This is confirmed by the text of the so-called Letter Tragedy of the fifth-century BCE comic poet Callias, and also by a passage in Plato's Cratylus, where Socrates states: [W]hen we speak of the letters of the alphabet, you know, we speak their names, not merely the letters themselves, except in the case of four: E, Y, O, and Ω.) By the second and third centuries AD, distinctions between long and short vowels began to disappear in pronunciation, leading to confusion between O and Ω in spelling. It was at this time that the new names of ὂ μικρόν ("small O") for O ὦ μέγα ("great O") for Ω were introduced.

== Mispronunciation ==
During the early outbreak of the Omicron variant of COVID-19, many people unfamiliar with the Greek alphabet mispronounced Omicron as "Omnicron" due to the prevalence of the prefix "Omni-" in many English words.

== Unicode ==
Greek omicron / Coptic O

- U+039F Ο GREEK CAPITAL LETTER OMICRON (&Omicron;)
- U+03BF ο GREEK SMALL LETTER OMICRON (&omicron;)
- U+2C9E Ⲟ COPTIC CAPITAL LETTER O
- U+2C9F ⲟ COPTIC SMALL LETTER O

These characters are used only as mathematical symbols. Stylized Greek text should be encoded using the normal Greek letters, with markup and formatting to indicate text style:

- U+1D6B6 𝚶 MATHEMATICAL BOLD CAPITAL OMICRON
- U+1D6D0 𝛐 MATHEMATICAL BOLD SMALL OMICRON
- U+1D6F0 𝛰 MATHEMATICAL ITALIC CAPITAL OMICRON
- U+1D70A 𝜊 MATHEMATICAL ITALIC SMALL OMICRON
- U+1D72A 𝜪 MATHEMATICAL BOLD ITALIC CAPITAL OMICRON
- U+1D744 𝝄 MATHEMATICAL BOLD ITALIC SMALL OMICRON
- U+1D764 𝝤 MATHEMATICAL SANS-SERIF BOLD CAPITAL OMICRON
- U+1D77E 𝝾 MATHEMATICAL SANS-SERIF BOLD SMALL OMICRON
- U+1D79E 𝞞 MATHEMATICAL SANS-SERIF BOLD ITALIC CAPITAL OMICRON
- U+1D7B8 𝞸 MATHEMATICAL SANS-SERIF BOLD ITALIC SMALL OMICRON
