= Episemon =

Episēmon (Greek ἐπίσημον, from epi- "on" plus sēma "sign"; plural: episēma) is a Greek word that can mean:

- a distinguishing mark or symbol, also called parasēmon, especially in the following contexts:
  - an ensign or figurehead on an ancient ship
  - a characteristic symbol displayed on a shield, similar to a coat of arms
  - a characteristic symbol stamped on an ancient coin
- the Greek letter Digamma, the numeral sign for "6"
- a generic term for all three supplementary Greek numeral signs (Digamma 6, Koppa 90, and Sampi 900) in the alphanumeric system of Greek numerals, or similar symbols in other scripts
