= Ͷ =

Ͷ ͷ represents two different, little-used letters found in separate dialects of Ancient Greek, which took the same shape by coincidence:

- Pamphylian digamma, used in Pamphylian Greek to represent /w/ in place of digamma ⟨Ϝ ϝ⟩, which was instead used for the novel phoneme /v/; it likely developed from Phoenician waw ⟨𐤅⟩ /w/
- Tsan, used in the Arcadian Greek dialect of Mantineia, which probably represented the affricate /t͡s/ (likely pronounced [t͡s] or [t͡ʃ]), akin to Attic ⟨ττ⟩ /tt/ and Cypriot ⟨σσ⟩ /ss/; it likely developed from (or alongside) san ⟨Ϻ ϻ⟩ /s/, from Phoenician tsade ⟨𐤑⟩ /t͡s/
