= Kai (conjunction) =

Greek ligature

Kai is a conjunction meaning "and" in Ancient Greek (καί, kaí, [kǎi̯]), Modern Greek (και, kai, [ce]), Coptic (ⲕⲁⲓ, kai, [cɛ]) and Esperanto (kaj, [kai̯]).

Kai is the most frequent word in any Greek text, and thus used by statisticians to assess authorship of ancient manuscripts based on the number of times it is used.

== Ligature ==
Because of its frequent occurrence, kai is sometimes abbreviated in Greek manuscripts and in signage, by a ligature (comparable to Latin &), written as ϗ (uppercase variant Ϗ; Coptic variant ⳤ), formed from kappa (κ) with an extra lower stroke. It may occur with the varia above it: ϗ̀.

Two possible renderings of the kai abbreviation.

One form of kai in medieval minuscule handwriting.

For representation in electronic texts the kai symbol has its own Unicode positions: GREEK KAI SYMBOL (U+03D7) and GREEK CAPITAL KAI SYMBOL (U+03CF).

== Authorship of ancient texts ==
The number of common words which express a general relation ('and', 'in', 'but', 'I', 'to be') is random with the same distribution at least among the same genre. By contrast, the occurrence of the definite article "the" cannot be modeled by simple probabilistic laws because the number of nouns with a definite article depends on the subject matter.

Table 1 has data about the epistles of Saint Paul. 2nd Thessalonians, Titus, and Philemon were excluded because they were too short to give reliable samples. From an analysis of these and other data the first 4 epistles (Romans, 1 Corinthians, 2 Corinthians, and Galatians) form a consistent group, and all the other epistles lie more than 2 standard deviations from the mean of this group (using $\chi^2$ statistics).

Table 1: Number of sentences in Paul's epistles with 0, 1, 2, and ≥3 occurrences of kai
Book	None	One	Two	Three+
Romans	386	141	34	17
1 Corinthians	424	152	35	16
2 Corinthians	192	86	28	13
Galatians	128	48	5	6
Philippians	42	29	19	12
Colossians	23	32	17	9
1 Thessalonians	34	23	8	16
1 Timothy	49	38	9	10
2 Timothy	45	28	11	4
Hebrews	155	94	37	24

== Esperanto ==
Esperanto kaj comes from Greek. It may be abbreviated as k. or k (among other places, in the PIV dictionary), or, sometimes, as &.

== See also ==
- Kaige revision, group of Greek-language Septuagint Bible versions that frequently use Koine Greek: και γε [kai ge] ('and indeed').
- &
