= San (letter) =

Archaic letter of the Greek alphabet

Use of san in archaic Corinthian script: incised shard with a list of names, c.700 BC. The text reads: ]........ΑΝ ΑΝΤΑΣ⁞ΧΑ.[ ]....ΚΕΑΣ⁞ΑΝΓΑΡΙΟΣ[ ]...ΑΥϜΙΟΣ⁞ΣΟΚΛΕΣ⁞[ ].ΤΙΔΑΣ⁞ΑΜΥΝΤΑΣ[ ]ΤΟΙ ΜΑΛΕϘΟ⁞ΚΑΙ.[ Note the use of san at the end of most names, and the difference between san and mu (with a shorter right stem,) in the word "ΑΜΥΝΤΑΣ".

Use of san in archaic Sicyonian writing: shard incised with the dedicatory inscription ΗΕΡΟΟΣ heroos (Attic spelling ἥρωος, "of the hero"), using san together with eta (Η), and a characteristic Sikyonian X-shaped form of epsilon.

San (Ϻ) is an archaic letter of the Greek alphabet. Its shape can be described as a sigma (Σ) turned sideways. It was used as an alternative to sigma to denote the sound /s/. Unlike sigma, whose position in the alphabet is between rho and tau, san appeared between pi and qoppa in alphabetic order. In addition to denoting the archaic character, the name "san" also came to be used for sigma itself.

== Historical use ==
=== Sigma and san ===
The existence of the two competing letters sigma and san is traditionally believed to have been due to confusion during the adoption of the Greek alphabet from the Phoenician script, because Phoenician had more sibilant sounds than Greek had. According to one theory, the distribution of the sibilant letters in Greek is due to pair-wise confusion between the sounds and alphabet positions of the four Phoenician sibilant signs: Greek sigma got its shape and alphabetic position from Phoenician shin (𐤔), but its name and sound value from Phoenician samekh. Conversely, Greek xi (Ξ) got its shape and alphabetical position from samekh (𐤎), but its name and sound value from shin. The same kind of pair-wise exchange happened between Phoenician zayin and tsade: Greek zeta has the shape and position of zayin (𐤆) but the name and sound value of tsade, and conversely Greek san has the approximate shape and position of tsade (𐤑) but may originally have had the sound value of zayin, i.e. voiced [z]. However, since voiced [z] and voiceless [s] were not distinct phonemes in Greek, sigma and san came to be used in essentially the same function.

According to a different theory, "san" was indeed the original name of what is now known as sigma, and as such presents a direct representation of the corresponding name "shin" in that position. This name was only later also associated with the alternative local letter now known as "san", whose original name remains unknown. The modern name "sigma", in turn, was a transparent Greek innovation that simply meant "hissing", based on a nominalization of a verb σίζω (sízō, from an earlier stem *sigj-, meaning 'to hiss').

Moreover, a modern re-interpretation of the sound values of the sibilants in Proto-Semitic, and thus in Phoenician, can account for the values of the Greek sibilants with less recourse to "confusion". Most significant is the reconstruction of shin as [s] and thus also the source of the sound value of sigma; in turn, Samekh is reconstructed as the affricate [ts], which is a better match for the plosive-fricative cluster value [kʰs] of xi.

Phoenician					Greek			
shape	position	name	traditional sound	sound after Kogan	shape	position	name	sound
𐤔	after 𐤓 (R)	Shin	/ʃ/	/s/	Σ	after Ρ (R)	Sigma	/s/
𐤎	after 𐤍 (N)	Samekh	/s/	/ts/	Ξ	after Ν (N)	Xi	/ks/
𐤆	after 𐤅 (W)	Zayin	/z/	/dz/	Ζ	after Ϝ (W)	Zeta	/dz/, /zd/
𐤑	after 𐤐 (P)	Tsade	/ts/	/tsʼ/	Ϻ	after Π (P)	San	*/z/? > /s/

Whereas in early abecedaria, sigma and san are typically listed as two separate letters in their separate alphabetic positions, each Greek dialect tended to use either san or sigma exclusively in practical writing. The use of san became a characteristic of the Doric dialects of Corinth and neighboring Sikyon, as well as Crete. San became largely obsolete by the second half of the fifth century BC, when it was generally replaced by sigma, although in Crete it continued in use for about a century longer. In Sikyon, it was retained as a symbolic mark of the city used on coin inscriptions, in the same way that archaic koppa (Ϙ) was used by Corinth, and a special form of beta by Byzantium).

San could be written with the outer stems either straight or slanted outwards, and either longer or of equal length with the inner strokes. It was typically distinguished from the similar-looking mu (Μ) by the fact that san tended to be symmetrical, whereas mu had a longer left stem in its archaic forms (which is similar to the Phoenician tsade 𐤑 that san derives from or mem 𐤌 that mu derives from).

Outside Greece, san was borrowed into the Old Italic alphabets (𐌑, transcribed as Ś). It initially retained its M-shape in the archaic Etruscan alphabet, but from the 6th century BC changing its aspect to a shape similar to that of the d-rune ᛞ.

The name "san" lived on as an dialectal or archaic name for sigma, even after the letter itself had been fully replaced by it. As such, Herodotus, in the late 5th century, reports that the same letter was called "san" by the Dorians, but "sigma" by the Ionians. Athenaeus in his Deipnosophistae (c.200 AD) quotes an epigram which contained the spelled-out name of the philosopher Thrasymachus, still using san as the name for sigma:

τοὔνομα θῆτα ῥῶ ἄλφα σὰν ὖ μῦ ἄλφα χεῖ οὖ σάν,
πατρὶς Χαλκηδών· ἡ δὲ τέχνη σοφίη.

"Name: Θ-Ρ-Α-Σ-Υ-Μ-Α-Χ-Ο-Σ,
Birthplace: Chalcedon; profession: wisdom"

=== Arcadian tsan ===
Arcadian "ts"

A unique letter variant Ͷ (shaped similarly to modern Cyrillic И, but with a slight leftward bend) has been found in a single inscription (therefore a hapax legomenon) in the Arcadocypriot dialect of Mantineia, Arcadia, a 5th-century BC inscription dedicated to Athena Alea (Inscriptiones Graecae V.ii.262) It is widely assumed to be a local innovation based on san, although Jeffery (1961) classes it as a variant of sigma. It appears to have denoted a /ts/ sound and has been called tsan by some modern writers. In the local Arcadian dialect, this sound occurred in words that reflect Proto-Greek */kʷ/. In such words, other Greek dialects usually have /t/, while the related Cypriot dialect has /s/. Examples are:

- ͷις (cf. Attic Greek: τις, 'somebody')
- ͷινα (cf. Attic Greek: τινά, 'somebody')
- οͷεοι (cf. Attic Greek: ὅτῳ 'to whomever')
- ειͷε (cf. Attic Greek: εἴτε 'either')

From these correspondences, it can be concluded that the letter most likely denoted an affricate sound, possibly [ts] or [tʃ], which would have been a natural intermediate step in the sound change from */kʷ/ to /s/. The letter has been represented in modern scholarly transcriptions of the Mantinea inscription by ⟨ś⟩ (s with an acute accent) or by ⟨σ̱⟩ (sigma with a macron underneath).

Note, however, that the same glyph is used to denote the unrelated letter digamma /w/ in Pamphylia (the "Pamphylian digamma") and was also the form of beta /b/ used in Melos.

=== Sampi ===
Sampi

The Ionic letter sampi (Ͳ), which later gave rise to the numeral symbol (ϡ = 900) may also be a continuation of san, although it did not have the same alphabetic position.

=== Bactrian Ϸ ===
Bactrian þ

In the Greek script used for writing the Bactrian language, there existed the letter Ϸ, which apparently stood for the sound /ʃ/ (transliterated as š), and has been named "sho" in recent times. According to one hypothesis, this letter too may go back to san.

== Modern use ==
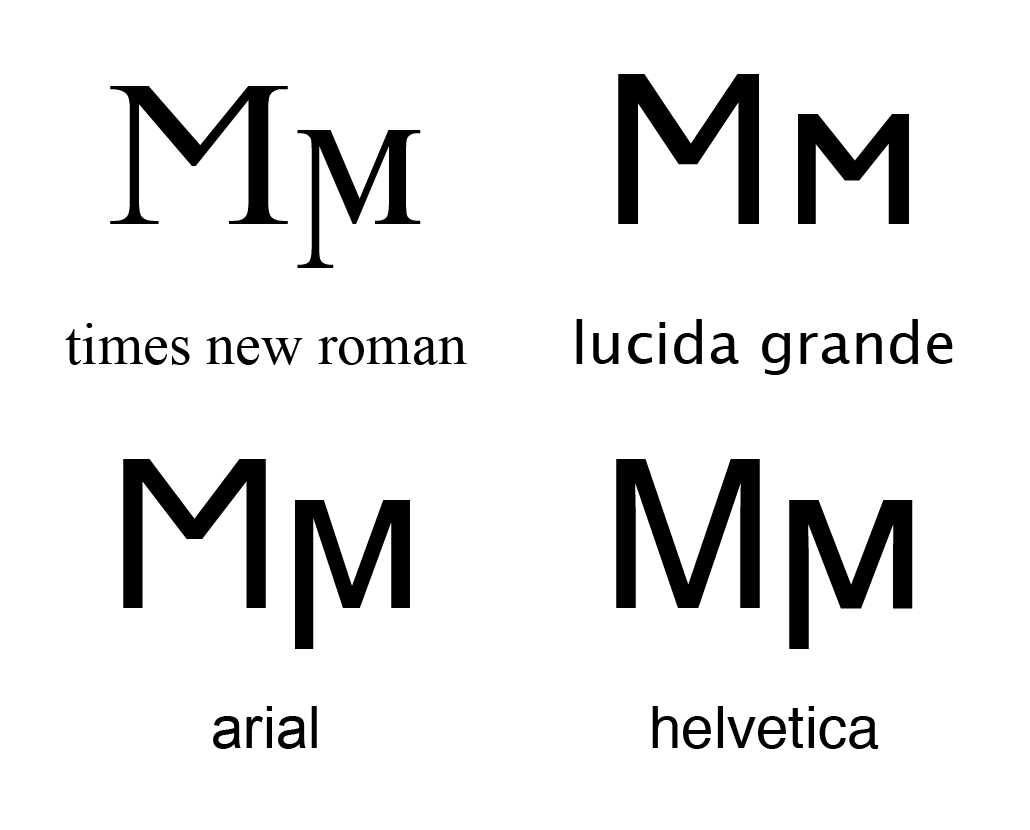
The letter san as it appears in four basic fonts: Times New Roman, Lucida Grande, Arial, and Helvetica

In modern editions and transcriptions of ancient Greek writing, san has rarely been used as a separate letter. Since it never contrasts systematically with sigma except in abecedaria, it is usually silently regularized to sigma in modern editorial practice. In the electronic encoding standard Unicode, a pair of uppercase and lowercase forms of the letter was introduced in version 4.0 (2003). For this purpose, new lowercase forms for modern typography, for which no prior typographic tradition existed, had to be designed. Most fonts have adopted the convention of distinguishing uppercase san from mu by having its central V-like section descend only halfway down above the baseline, and lowercase san by giving it a left stem descending below the baseline. (Note that in historical epigraphic practice it was the other way round, with san being symmetrical and mu having a longer left stem.)

== Unicode ==
San is encoded in Unicode, but the Arcadian "tsan" variant is unified with the identical-looking Pamphylian digamma since version 5.1.

- U+03FA Ϻ GREEK CAPITAL LETTER SAN
- U+03FB ϻ GREEK SMALL LETTER SAN
- U+0376 Ͷ GREEK CAPITAL LETTER PAMPHYLIAN DIGAMMA
- U+0377 ͷ GREEK SMALL LETTER PAMPHYLIAN DIGAMMA
