= Digamma =

Archaic letter of the Greek alphabet

Digamma, or wau (uppercase: Ϝ, lowercase: ϝ, numeral: ϛ), is an archaic letter of the Greek alphabet. It originally stood for the sound /w/ but it has remained in use principally as a Greek numeral for 6. Whereas it was originally called waw or wau, its most common appellation in classical Greek is digamma; as a numeral, it was called episēmon during the Byzantine era and is now known as stigma after the Byzantine ligature combining σ-τ as ϛ.

Digamma or wau was part of the original archaic Greek alphabet as initially adopted from Phoenician. Like its model, Phoenician waw, it represented the voiced labial-velar approximant /w/ and stood in the 6th position in the alphabet between epsilon and zeta. It is the consonantal doublet of the vowel letter upsilon (/u/), which was also derived from waw but was placed near the end of the Greek alphabet. Digamma or wau is in turn the ancestor of the Latin letter F. As an alphabetic letter, it is attested in archaic and dialectal ancient Greek inscriptions until the classical period.

The shape of the letter went through a development from through,,, to or, which at that point was conflated with the σ-τ ligature. In modern print, a distinction is made between the letter in its original alphabetic role as a consonant sign, which is rendered as "Ϝ" or its modern lowercase variant "ϝ", and the numeric symbol, which is represented by "ϛ". In modern Greek, this is often replaced by the digraph στ.

== Greek w ==
=== Mycenaean Greek ===
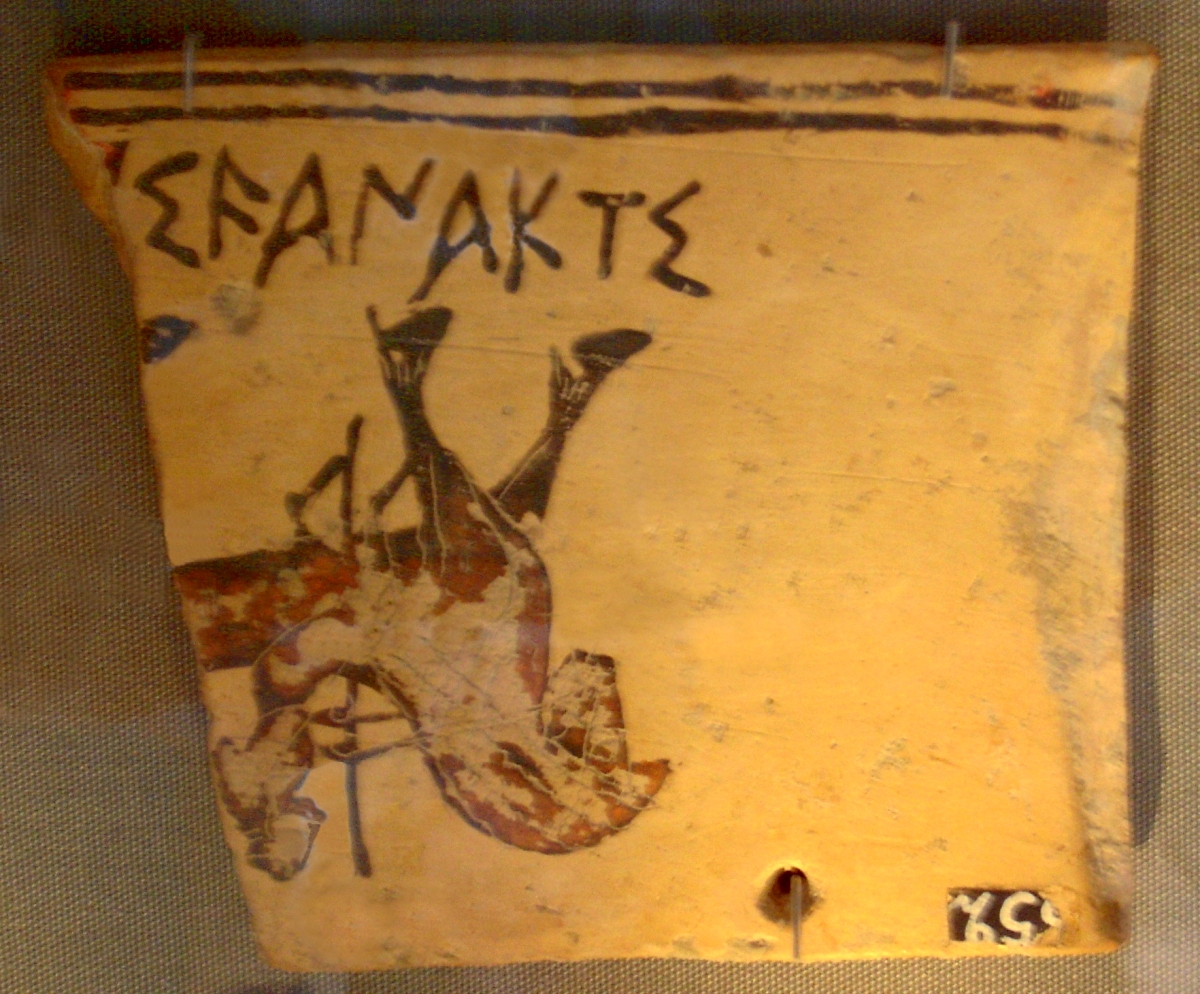
Ancient Greek ceramic fragment depicting a horse with rider. The inscription reads [...]Ι ϜΑΝΑΚΤΙ ([...]i wanakti), "to the king", with an initial digamma (and a local Σ-shaped form for iota).

The sound /w/ existed in Mycenean Greek, as attested in Linear B and archaic Greek inscriptions using digamma. It is also confirmed by the Hittite name of Troy, Wilusa, corresponding to the Greek name *Wilion, classical Ἴλιον Ílion (Ilium).

=== Classical Greek ===
The /w/ sound was lost at various times in various dialects, mostly before the classical period.

In Ionic, /w/ had probably disappeared before Homer's epics were written down (7th century BC), but its former presence can be detected in many cases because its omission left the meter defective. For example, the word ἄναξ ("(tribal) king, lord, (military) leader"), found in the Iliad, would have originally been ϝάναξ /wánaks/ (and is attested in this form in Mycenaean Greek;) and the word οἶνος ("wine") is sometimes used in the meter where a word starting with a consonant would be expected. Further evidence coupled with cognate-analysis shows that οἶνος was earlier ϝοῖνος /woînos/ (compare Cretan Doric ibêna and Latin vīnum, which is the origin of English wine). There have been editions of the Homeric epics where the wau was re-added, particularly in the late 19th and early 20th centuries, but these have largely fallen out of favour.

Aeolian was the dialect that kept the sound /w/ longest. In discussions by ancient Greek grammarians of the Hellenistic era, the letter is therefore often described as a characteristic Aeolian feature.

Loanwords that entered Greek before the loss of /w-/ lost that sound when Greek did. For instance, Oscan Viteliu ('land of the male calves', compare Latin: vitulus 'yearling, male calf') gave rise to the Greek word Ἰταλία Italía. The Adriatic tribe of the Veneti was called in Ἐνετοί Enetoí. In loanwords that entered the Greek language after the drop of /w/, the phoneme was once again registered, compare for example the spelling of Οὐάτεις Ouáteis for vates.

=== Pamphylian digamma ===
Pamphylian digamma

In some local (epichoric) alphabets, a variant glyph of the letter digamma existed: Ͷ. In Pamphylian Greek, it existed side by side with standard digamma as two distinct letters, due to /w/ shifting to labiodental /v/ in some - but not all - environments. Ϝ seems to have been used for shifted /v/, while Ͷ was used in the positions where /w/ was retained.

== Numeral ==
Digamma/wau remained in use in the system of Greek numerals attributed to Miletus, where it stood for the number 6, reflecting its original place in the sequence of the alphabet. It was one of three letters that were kept in this way in addition to the 24 letters of the classical alphabet, the other two being koppa (ϙ) for 90, and sampi (ϡ) for 900. During their history in handwriting in late antiquity and the Byzantine era, all three of these symbols underwent several changes in shape, with digamma ultimately taking the form of "ϛ".

It has remained in use as a numeral in Greek to the present day, in contexts comparable to those where Latin numerals would be used in English, for instance in regnal numbers of monarchs or in enumerating chapters in a book, although in practice the letter sequence ΣΤ΄ is much more common.

== Glyph development ==
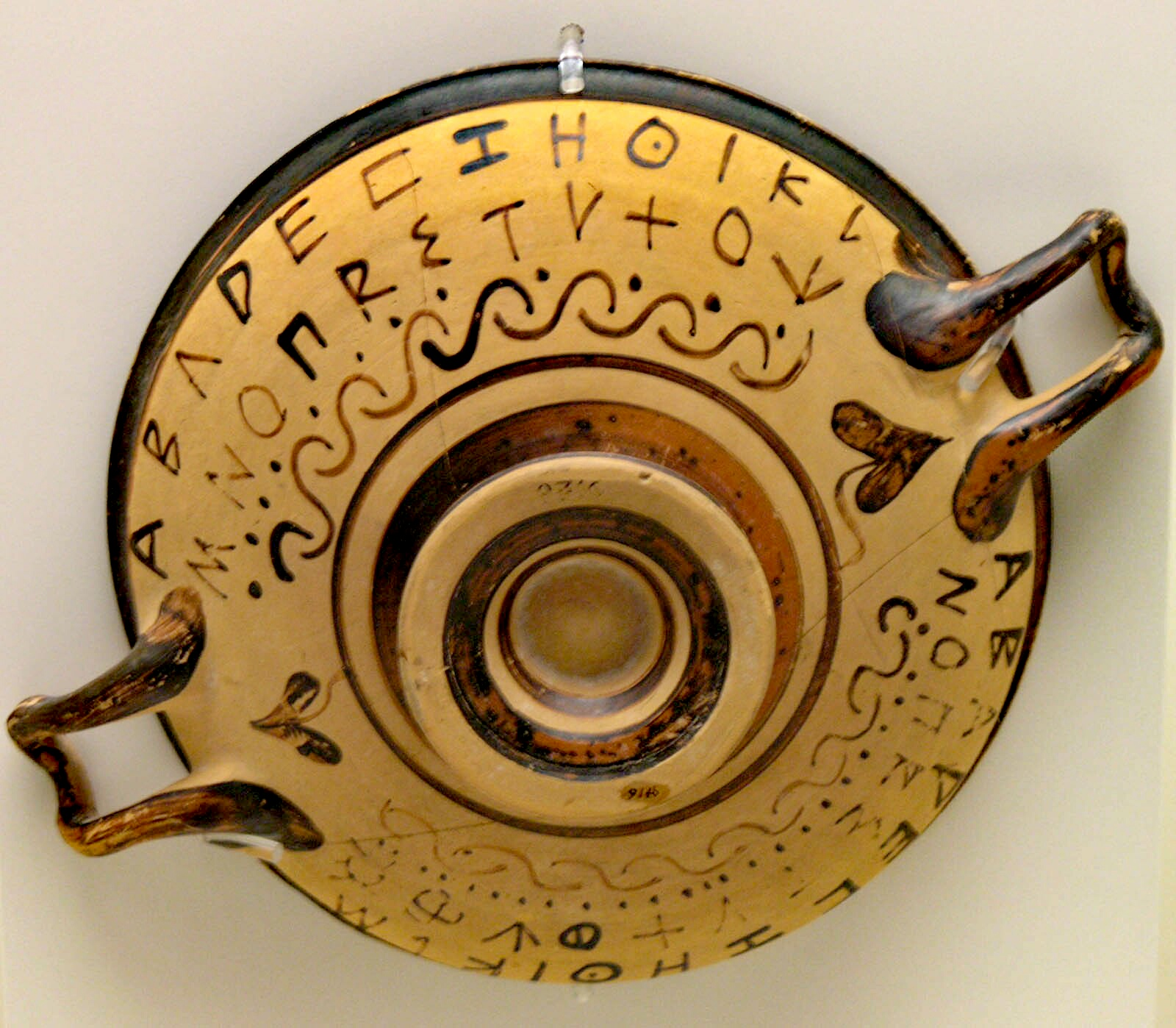
The alphabet on a black figure vessel, with a square-C digamma.

=== Epigraphy ===
Digamma was derived from Phoenician waw, which was shaped roughly like a Y. Of the two Greek reflexes of waw, digamma retained the alphabetic position, but had its shape modified to, while the upsilon retained the original shape but was placed in a new alphabetic position. Early Crete had an archaic form of digamma somewhat closer to the original Phoenician,, or a variant with the stem bent sidewards. The shape, during the archaic period, underwent a development parallel to that of epsilon (which changed from to "E", with the arms becoming orthogonal and the lower end of the stem being shed off). For digamma, this led to the two main variants of classical "F" and square.

The latter of these two shapes became dominant when used as a numeral, with "F" only very rarely employed in this function. However, in Athens, both of these were avoided in favour of a number of alternative numeral shapes.

=== Early handwriting ===
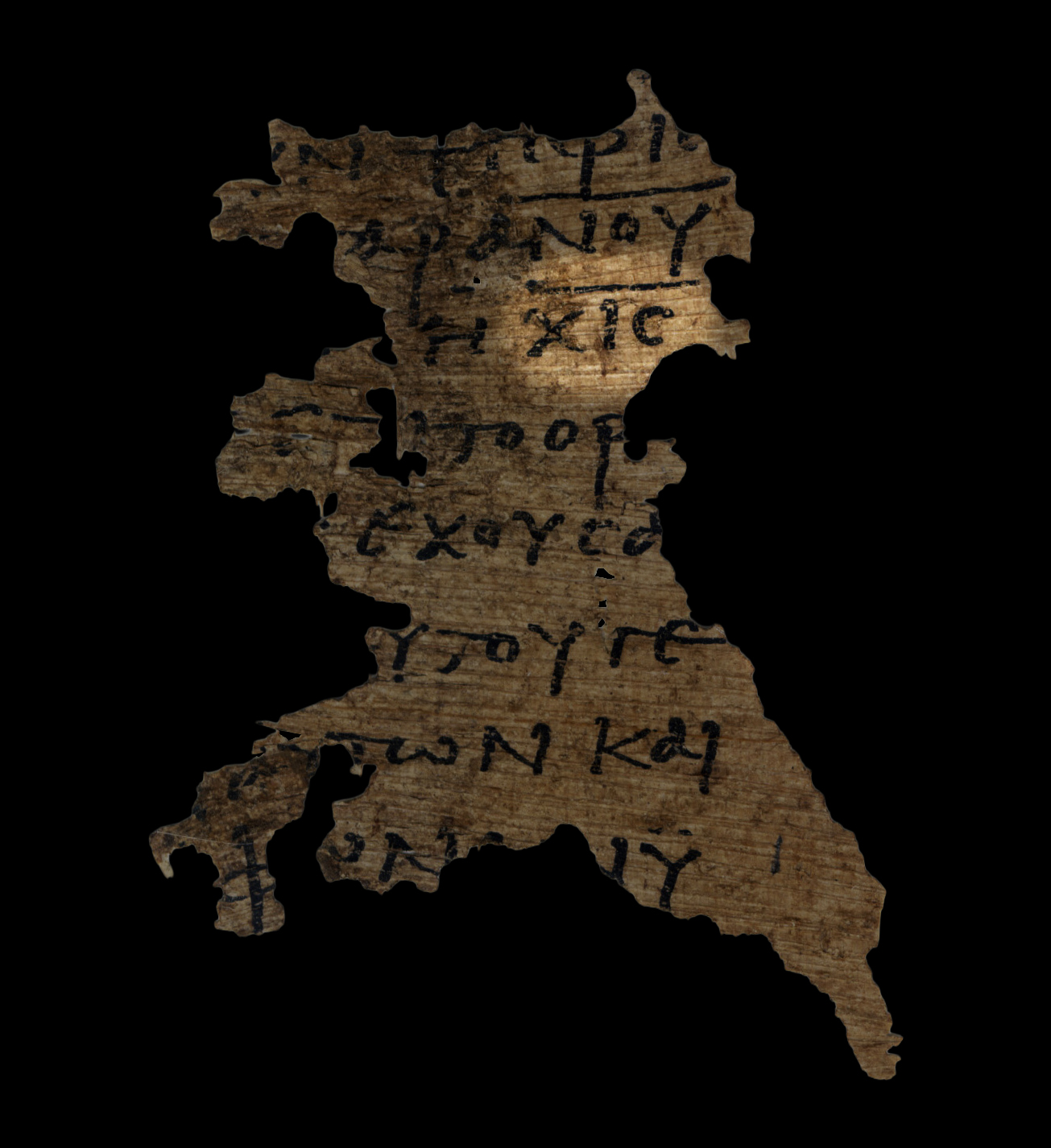
A fragment of Papyrus 115, showing the number "χ̅ι̅ϛ̅" (616, the "Number of the Beast"), with a C-shaped digamma.

In cursive handwriting, the square-C form developed further into a rounded form resembling a "C" (found in papyrus manuscripts as, on coins sometimes as). It then developed a downward tail at the end and finally adopted a shape like a Latin "s" These cursive forms are also found in stone inscriptions in late antiquity.

=== Conflation with the στ ligature ===
Two instances of s-shaped numeral digamma in the number "9996 4/6" (͵θ̅ϡ̅ϟ̅ϛ̅ δʹ ϛʹ) in a minuscule mathematical manuscript, c.1100 AD. Below, a phrase containing two instances of the ligature "στ" ("ἔσται τὸ στερεὸν"), still distinguished from the numeral.

In the ninth and tenth centuries, the cursive shape digamma was visually conflated with a ligature of sigma (in its historical "lunate" form) and tau ( + =,). The στ-ligature had become common in minuscule handwriting from the 9th century onwards. Both closed and open forms were subsequently used without distinction both for the ligature and for the numeral. The ligature took on the name of "stigma" or "sti", and the name stigma is today applied to it both in its textual and in the numeral function. The association between its two functions as a numeral and as a sign for "st" became so strong that in modern typographic practice in Greece, whenever the ϛʹ sign itself is not available, the letter sequences στʹ or ΣΤʹ are used instead for the number 6.

=== Typography ===
In western typesetting during the modern era, the numeral symbol was routinely represented by the same character as the stigma ligature (ϛ). In normal text, this ligature together with numerous others continued to be used widely until the early nineteenth century, following the style of earlier minuscule handwriting, but ligatures then gradually dropped out of use. The stigma ligature was among those that survived longest, but it too became obsolete in print after the mid-19th century. Today it is used only to represent the numeric digamma, and never to represent the sequence στ in text.

Along with the other special numeric symbols koppa and sampi, numeric digamma/stigma normally has no distinction between uppercase and lowercase forms, (while other alphabetic letters can be used as numerals in both cases). Distinct uppercase versions were occasionally used in the 19th century. Several different shapes of uppercase stigma can be found, with the lower end either styled as a small curved S-like hook, or as a straight stem, the latter either with a serif or without one. An alternative uppercase stylization in some twentieth-century fonts is, visually a ligature of Roman-style uppercase C and T.

The characters used for numeric digamma/stigma are distinguished in modern print from the character used to represent the ancient alphabetic digamma, the letter for the [w] sound. This is rendered in print by a Latin "F", or sometimes a variant of it specially designed to fit in typographically with Greek (Ϝ). It has a modern lowercase form (ϝ) that typically differs from Latin "f" by having two parallel horizontal strokes like the uppercase character, with the vertical stem often being somewhat slanted to the right or curved, and usually descending below the baseline. This character is used in Greek epigraphy to transcribe the text of ancient inscriptions that contain "Ϝ", and in linguistics and historical grammar when describing reconstructed proto-forms of Greek words that contained the sound /w/.

== Glyph confusion ==
Example of a nineteenth-century font using S-shaped capital Stigma (first row) and G-shaped capital Koppa (second row).

Example of a nineteenth-century font using turned-lamedh-shaped capital Koppa and G-shaped capital Stigma.

Stigma and Koppa in modern fonts.

Throughout much of its history, the shape of digamma/stigma has often been very similar to that of other symbols, with which it can easily be confused. In ancient papyri, the cursive C-shaped form of numeric digamma is often indistinguishable from the C-shaped ("lunate") form that was then the common form of sigma. The similarity is still found today, since both the modern stigma (ϛ) and modern final sigma (ς) look identical or almost identical in most fonts; both are historically continuations of their ancient C-shaped forms with the addition of the same downward flourish. If the two characters are distinguished in print, the top loop of stigma tends to be somewhat larger and to extend farther to the right than that of final sigma. The two characters are, however, always distinguishable from the context in modern usage, both in numeric notation and in text: the final form of sigma never occurs in numerals (the number 200 being always written with the medial sigma, σ), and in normal Greek text the sequence "στ" can never occur word-finally.

The medieval s-like shape of digamma has the same shape as a contemporary abbreviation for καὶ ("and").

Yet another case of glyph confusion exists in the printed uppercase forms, this time between stigma and the other numeral, koppa (90). In ancient and medieval handwriting, koppa developed from through,, to. The uppercase forms and can represent either koppa or stigma. Frequent confusion between these two values in contemporary printing was already noted by some commentators in the eighteenth century. The ambiguity continues in modern fonts, many of which continue to have glyph similar to for either koppa or stigma.

== Names ==
The symbol has been called by a variety of different names, referring either to its alphabetic or its numeral function or both.

=== Wau ===
Wau (variously rendered as vau, waw or similarly in English) is the original name of the alphabetic letter for /w/ in ancient Greek. It is often cited in its reconstructed acrophonic spelling "ϝαῦ". This form itself is not historically attested in Greek inscriptions, but the existence of the name can be inferred from descriptions by contemporary Latin grammarians, who render it as vau. In later Greek, where both the letter and the sound it represented had become inaccessible, the name is rendered as βαῦ or οὐαῦ. In the 19th century, vau in English was a common name for the symbol ϛ in its numerical function, used by authors who distinguished it both from the alphabetic "digamma" and from ϛ as a στ ligature.

=== Digamma ===
The name digamma was used in ancient Greek and is the most common name for the letter in its alphabetic function today. It literally means "double gamma" and is descriptive of the original letter's shape, which looked like a Γ (gamma) placed on top of another.

=== Episemon ===
The name episēmon was used for the numeral symbol during the Byzantine era and is still sometimes used today, either as a name specifically for digamma/stigma, or as a generic term for the whole group of extra-alphabetic numeral signs (digamma, koppa and sampi). The Greek word "ἐπίσημον", from ἐπί- (epi-, "on") and σήμα (sēma, "sign"), literally means "a distinguishing mark", "a badge", but is also the neuter form of the related adjective "ἐπίσημος" ("distinguished", "remarkable"). This word was connected to the number "six" through early Christian mystical numerology. According to an account of the teachings of the heretic Marcus given by the church father Irenaeus, the number six was regarded as a symbol of Christ, and was hence called "ὁ ἐπίσημος ἀριθμός" ("the outstanding number"); likewise, the name Ἰησοῦς (Jesus), having six letters, was "τὸ ἐπίσημον ὄνομα" ("the outstanding name"), and so on. The sixth-century treatise About the Mystery of the Letters, which also links the six to Christ, calls the number sign to Episēmon throughout. The same name is still found in a fifteenth-century arithmetical manual by the Greek mathematician Nikolaos Rabdas. It is also found in a number of western European accounts of the Greek alphabet written in Latin during the early Middle Ages. One of them is the work De loquela per gestum digitorum, a didactic text about arithmetics attributed to the Venerable Bede, where the three Greek numerals for 6, 90 and 900 are called "episimon", "cophe" and "enneacosis" respectively. From Beda, the term was adopted by the seventeenth century humanist Joseph Justus Scaliger. However, misinterpreting Beda's reference, Scaliger applied the term episēmon not as a name proper for digamma/6 alone, but as a cover term for all three numeral letters. From Scaliger, the term found its way into modern academic usage in this new meaning, of referring to complementary numeral symbols standing outside the alphabetic sequence proper, in Greek and other similar scripts.

=== Gabex or Gamex ===
In one remark in the context of a biblical commentary, the 4th century scholar Ammonius of Alexandria is reported to have mentioned that the numeral symbol for 6 was called gabex by his contemporaries. The same reference in Ammonius has alternatively been read as gam(m)ex by some modern authors. Ammonius as well as later theologians discuss the symbol in the context of explaining the apparent contradiction and variant readings between the gospels in assigning the death of Jesus either to the "third hour" or "sixth hour", arguing that the one numeral symbol could easily have been substituted for the other through a scribal error.

=== Stigma ===
The name "stigma" (στίγμα) was originally a common Greek noun meaning "a mark, dot, puncture" or generally "a sign", from the verb στίζω ("to puncture"). It had an earlier writing-related special meaning, being the name for a dot as a punctuation mark, used for instance to mark shortness of a syllable in the notation of rhythm. It was then co-opted as a name specifically for the στ ligature, evidently because of the acrophonic value of its initial st- as well as the analogy with the name of sigma. Other names coined according to the same analogical principle are sti or stau.

== Unicode ==
- U+03DC Ϝ GREEK LETTER DIGAMMA
- U+03DD ϝ GREEK SMALL LETTER DIGAMMA
- U+10A5 Ⴅ GEORGIAN CAPITAL LETTER VIN
- U+2D05 ⴅ GEORGIAN SMALL LETTER VIN
- U+10D5 ვ GEORGIAN LETTER VIN
- U+03DA Ϛ GREEK LETTER STIGMA
- U+03DB ϛ GREEK SMALL LETTER STIGMA
- U+0376 Ͷ GREEK CAPITAL LETTER PAMPHYLIAN DIGAMMA
- U+0377 ͷ GREEK SMALL LETTER PAMPHYLIAN DIGAMMA
- U+2C8A Ⲋ COPTIC CAPITAL LETTER SOU
- U+2C8B ⲋ COPTIC SMALL LETTER SOU
- U+10305 𐌅 OLD ITALIC LETTER VE
- U+10905 𐤅 PHOENICIAN LETTER WAU
- U+1D7CA 𝟊 MATHEMATICAL BOLD CAPITAL DIGAMMA
- U+1D7CB 𝟋 MATHEMATICAL BOLD SMALL DIGAMMA

== Sources ==
- Peter T. Daniels – William Bright (edd.), The World's Writing Systems, New York, Oxford University Press, 1996. ISBN 0-19-507993-0
- Jean Humbert, Histoire de la langue grecque, Paris, 1972.
- Michel Lejeune, Phonétique historique du mycénien et du grec ancien, Paris, Klincksieck, 1967. ISBN 2-252-03496-3
- Munro, D. B. (1891). A Grammar of the Homeric Dialect (2nd ed.). Oxford: At the Clarendon Press.
- "In Search of The Trojan War", pp. 142–143,187 by Michael Wood, 1985, published by BBC.
