= 11 =

Eleven or 11 most often refers to:

- 11 (number), the natural number following 10 and preceding 12

Eleven or 11 may also refer to:

== Date and time ==
- One of the years 11 BC, AD 11, 1911, 2011
- November, the eleventh month of the year
- Elevenses, a short break taken at around 11:00 a.m. to consume a drink or snack

== Arts and media ==
=== Fictional characters ===
- Eleven (Stranger Things), from the Netflix series Stranger Things
- Eleven, a main character featured in Dragon Quest XI

=== Literature ===
- Eleven (novel), 2006, by British author David Llewellyn
- Eleven, a 1970 collection of short stories by Patricia Highsmith
- Eleven, a 2004 children's novel in The Winnie Years by Lauren Myracle
- Eleven, a 2008 children's novel by Patricia Reilly Giff
- "Eleven", a short story by Sandra Cisneros

=== Music ===
==== Albums ====
- 11 (The Smithereens album), 1989
- 11 (Ua album), 1996
- 11 (Bryan Adams album), 2008
- 11 (Sault album), 2022
- Eleven (Harry Connick, Jr. album), 1992
- Eleven (22-Pistepirkko album), 1998
- Eleven (Sugarcult album), 1999
- Eleven (B'z album), 2000
- Eleven (Reamonn album), 2010
- Eleven (Martina McBride album), 2011
- Eleven (Mr Fogg album), 2012
- Eleven (Tina Arena album), 2015
- Eleven (Jeff Lorber and Mike Stern album), 2019
- Eleven (single album), 2021 debut single album by Ive

==== Songs ====
- "11" (song), 2013, by Cassadee Pope from Frame by Frame
- "Eleven" (Ive song), a 2021 debut single by Ive
- "Eleven" (Khalid song), 2020, by Khalid
- "Eleven", 2006, by ¡Forward, Russia! from Give Me a Wall
- "Eleven", 2011, by Chameleon Circuit on Still Got Legs
- "Eleven", a 2011 single by Fantine
- "Eleven", 2018, by Last Dinosaurs from Yumeno Garden
- "Eleven", 1991, by Primus from Sailing the Seas of Cheese
- "Eleven", 2018, by Todrick Hall from Forbidden
- "Eleven", 2013, by C418 from Minecraft – Volume Beta
- "The Eleven", 1969, by the Grateful Dead from Live/Dead

==== Other uses in music ====
- Eleven (band), an American rock band
- Eleven: A Music Company, an Australian record label

=== Movies ===
- 11Eleven Project, documentary created by Danielle Lauren
- Eleven (film), a 2025 Indian crime thriller
- 11 (film), a 2026 horror thriller
- Ocean's 11, a 1960 American crime and comedy film
- Ocean's Eleven, a remake of the original film, Ocean's 11
- Up to eleven, an idiom from popular culture, coined in the movie This Is Spinal Tap

=== Television and news ===
- Eleven, an Australian digital television multichannel, now renamed 10 Peach
- Eleven Film (company), a British television production company based in London
- WPIX (PIX 11), an American television channel covering New York, New Jersey, and Connecticut
- KAN 11, an Israeli television channel
- Eleven Media Group, a news and sports media company in Myanmar
  - Weekly Eleven, a newspaper published by the company

== Computing ==
- Windows 11, an operating system by Microsoft
- iOS 11, an operating system by Apple
- Android 11, an operating system used by android devices in 2020

== Transportation ==
- Lotus Eleven, a sports racing car
- Tatra 11, an automobile
- List of highways numbered 11
- Line 11 (disambiguation), various metro lines

== Other uses ==
- 11 Parthenope, an asteroid in the asteroid belt
- EleVen, a clothing range designed by tennis player Venus Williams

== See also ==
- 11:11 (disambiguation)
- Number 11 (disambiguation)
- 1-1 (disambiguation)
- Eleventh (disambiguation)
- General Order No. 11 (disambiguation), two Union Army directives in the American Civil War
- Xi (disambiguation)
- XI (disambiguation)
