= HSI =

HSI may refer to:

== Government and politics ==
- Croatian Syrmian Initiative, a political party in Serbia (Croatian: Hrvatska srijemska inicijativa)
- Hispanic-serving institution, an American college designation
- Homeland Security Investigations, an American law enforcement agency
- Humane Society International, an animal welfare organization

== Science and technology ==
- HSI color space, in computing
- Heterosubtypic immunity, in medicine
- High Speed Interconnect, a computer chip
- Horizontal shaft impactor, a rock crusher
- Horizontal situation indicator, an aircraft instrument
- Hurricane Severity Index
- Hyperspectral imaging

== Sport ==
- HSI (track team)
- Croatian World Games (Croatian: Hrvatske svjetske igre), multi-sport international event
- Icelandic Handball Association (Icelandic: Handknattleikssamband Íslands, HSÍ)

== Other uses ==
- Hsi (surname), various Chinese surnames, romanized Xi in Pinyin
- Hang Seng Index, a stock market index
- Hastings Municipal Airport, Nebraska, United States
- Billboard Hot 100, a chart with the shortcut "HSI"
- Sultan Ismail Hospital, Johor, Malaysia

== See also ==
- HS1 (disambiguation) ('HS' and the digit '1')
- Xi (disambiguation) — Xi and Hsi are different transliterations of the same sound in Chinese
