= XI =

XI may refer to:

- 11 (number), XI in Roman numerals
- First XI of a cricket or football team
- XI monogram, an early Christian symbol
- XI (album), an album by Metal Church
- X.I., a fictional supercomputer in the video game Terminal Velocity
- Northern Ireland, ISO 3166-1 alpha-2 country code used for tax purposes
- XI bit (or NX bit), a security-related computer technology for x86 and x64 processors

== See also ==
- Xi (disambiguation)
- 11 (disambiguation)
