= Chi Rho =

Symbol for Jesus Christ (ΧΡΙΣΤΟΣ)

The Chi Rho symbol

The Chi Rho or Chi-Rho (☧, English pronunciation /ˈkaɪ ˈroʊ/ KY-ROH; also known as chrismon) is one of the earliest forms of the Christogram, formed by superimposing the first two (capital) letters—chi and rho (ΧΡ)—of the Greek ΧΡΙΣΤΟΣ (rom: Christos) in such a way that the vertical stroke of the rho intersects the center of the chi.

The Chi Rho symbol was used by the Roman Emperor Constantine the Great (r. 306–337 AD) as part of a military standard (vexillum). Constantine's standard was known as the Labarum. Early symbols similar to the Chi Rho were the Staurogram (⳨) and the IX monogram.

Although formed of Greek characters, the device (or its separate parts) is frequently found serving as an abbreviation in Latin text, with endings added appropriate to a Latin noun, thus XPo, signifying Christo, "to Christ", the dative form of Christus, or χρ̅icola, signifying Christicola, "Christian", in the Latin lyrics of Sumer is icumen in.

== Origin and adoption ==
=== Usage before Christianity ===
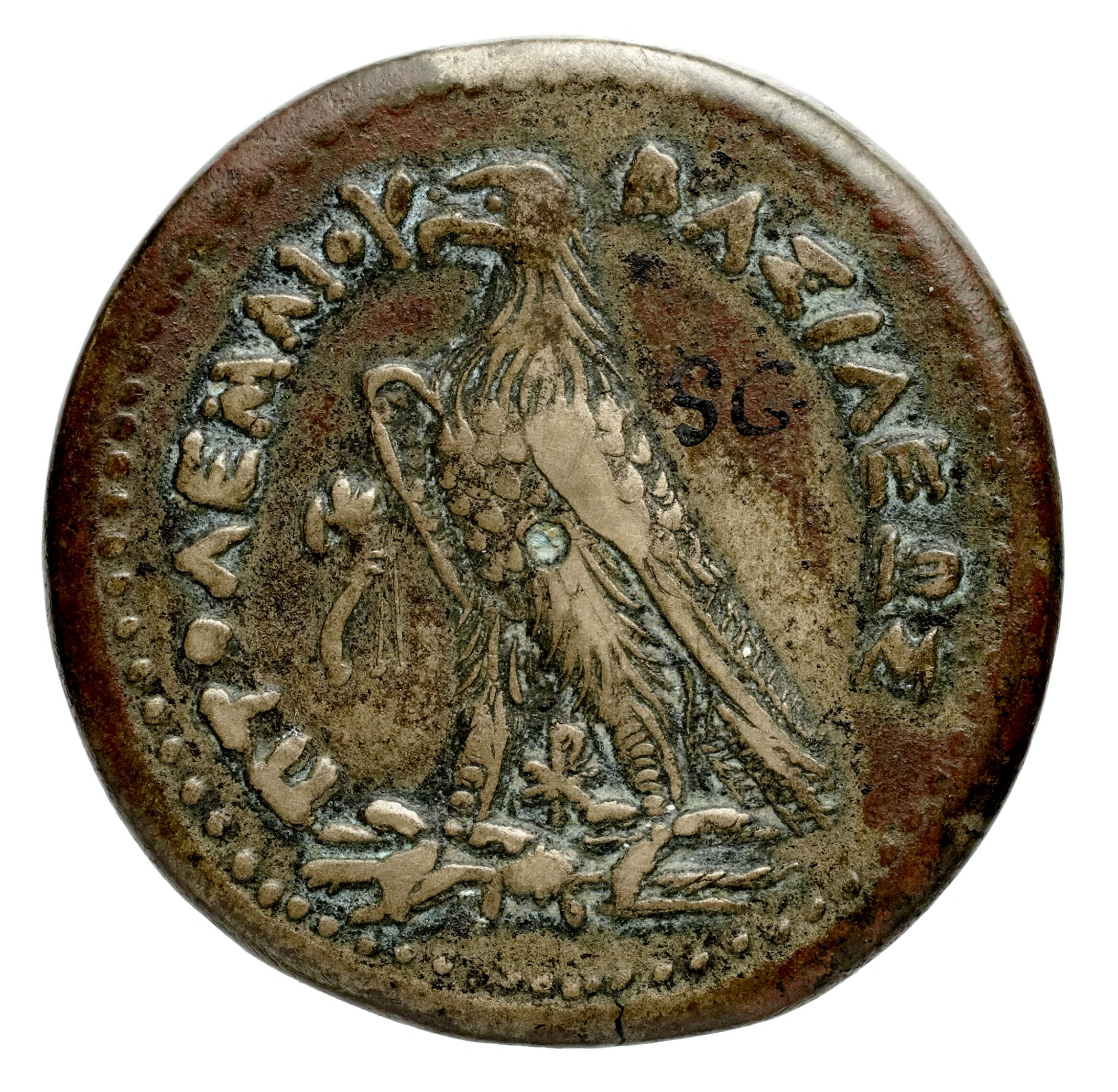
Reverse of a bronze triobol minted during reign of Ptolemy III Euergetes in Egypt (from 246 BC to 222 BC), with a Chi Rho visible between the eagle's legs

In pre-Christian times, the Chi-Rho symbol was used to mark a particularly valuable or relevant passage in the margin of a page, abbreviating chrēston (good). Some coins of Ptolemy III Euergetes (r. 246–222 BC) were marked with a Chi-Rho.

=== In Christianity ===
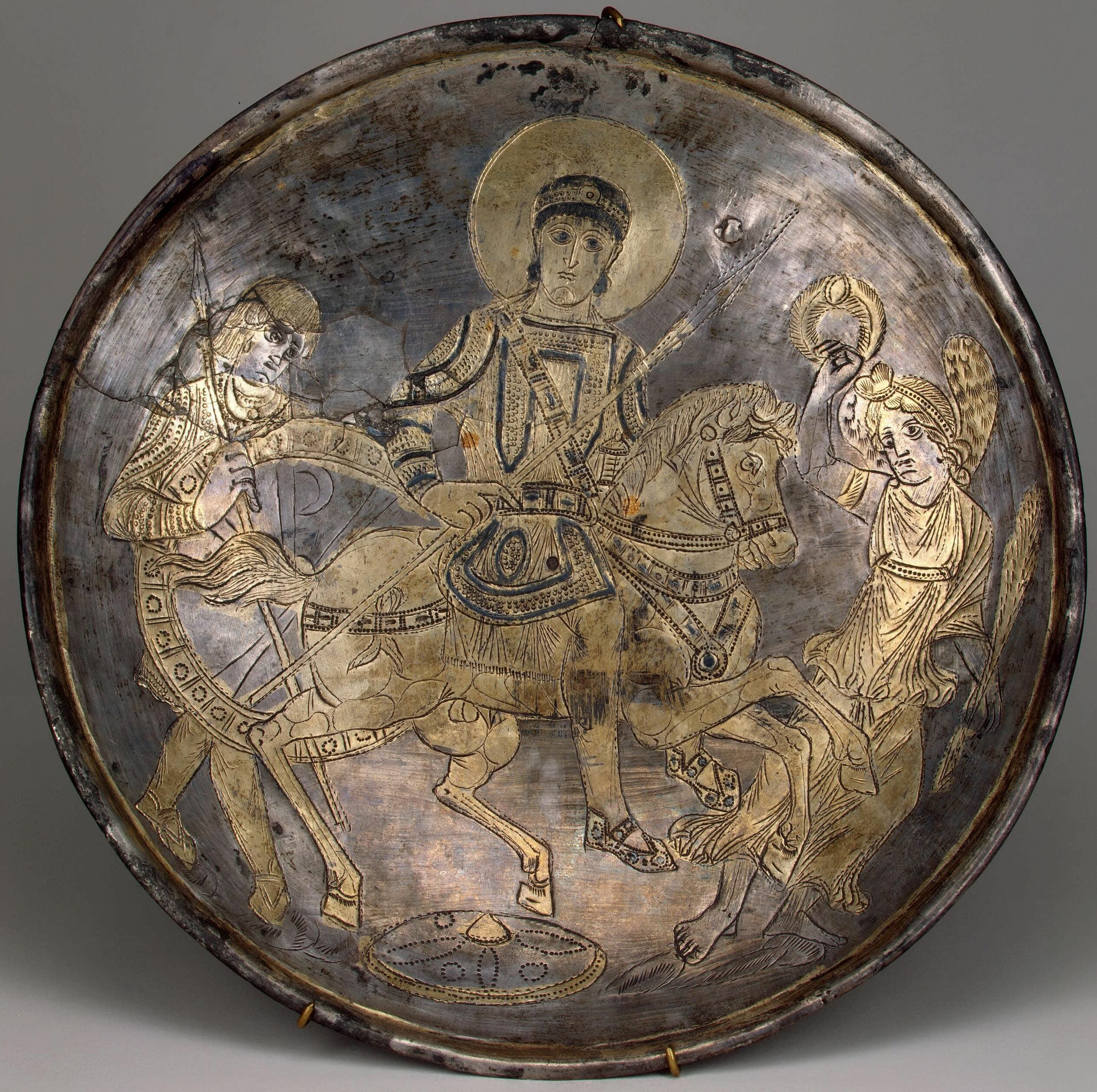
Missorium depicting Constantine the Great's son Constantius II on horseback, accompanied by a guardsman with the Chi Rho depicted on his shield (at left, behind the horse)

Symbols on pre-Constantinian Christian sarcophagi sometimes included a chi-rho monogram.

According to Lactantius, (a Latin historian of North African origins saved from poverty by the Emperor Constantine the Great (r. 306–337), who made him tutor to his son Crispus) Constantine dreamt of being ordered to put a "heavenly divine symbol" (Latin: coeleste signum dei) on the shields of his soldiers. The description of the actual symbol chosen by Emperor Constantine the next morning, as reported by Lactantius, is not very clear: it closely resembles a Tau-Rho or a staurogram, a similar Christian symbol. That very day Constantine's army fought the forces of Maxentius and won the Battle of the Milvian Bridge (312), outside Rome.

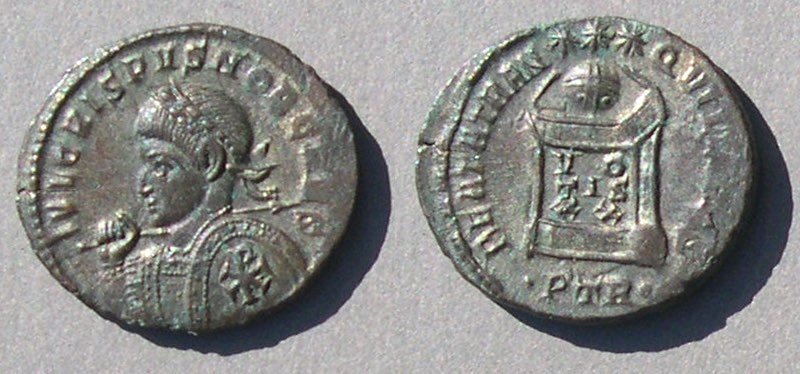
A bronze coin of Crispus, a son of Constantine, with a Chi Rho on his shield (struck c. 326), showing that the symbol mentioned by Lactantius and Eusebius was a Chi Rho

Eusebius of Caesarea (died in 339) gave two different accounts of the events of Constantine's victory. In his Church History, written shortly after the battle, when Eusebius had not yet had contact with Constantine, he does not mention any dream or vision, but compares the defeat of Maxentius (drowned in the Tiber) to that of the biblical pharaoh and credits Constantine's victory to divine protection.

Reconstruction of the Labarum with the Chi Rho based on Constantinian coinage, with the three dots representing "medallions" that are said to have shown portraits of Constantine and his sons

In a memoir of the Roman emperor that Eusebius wrote after Constantine's death (On the Life of Constantine, c. 337–339), a miraculous appearance is said to have come in Gaul — long before the Battle of the Milvian Bridge. In this later version, the Roman emperor had been pondering the misfortunes that befell commanders who invoked the help of many different gods, and decided to seek divine aid in the forthcoming battle from the One God. At noon, Constantine saw a cross of light imposed over the sun. Attached to it, in Greek characters, was the saying "Ἐν τούτῳ νίκα!" ("In this, conquer!"). Not only Constantine, but the whole army saw the miracle. That night, Christ appeared to the Roman emperor in a dream and told him to make a replica of the sign he had seen in the sky, which would be a sure defence in battle.

Eusebius wrote in the Vita that Constantine himself had told him this story "and confirmed it with oaths" late in life "when I was deemed worthy of his acquaintance and company". "Indeed", says Eusebius, "had anyone else told this story, it would not have been easy to accept it."

Eusebius also left a description of the labarum, the military standard which incorporated the Chi-Rho sign, used by Emperor Constantine in his later wars against Licinius.

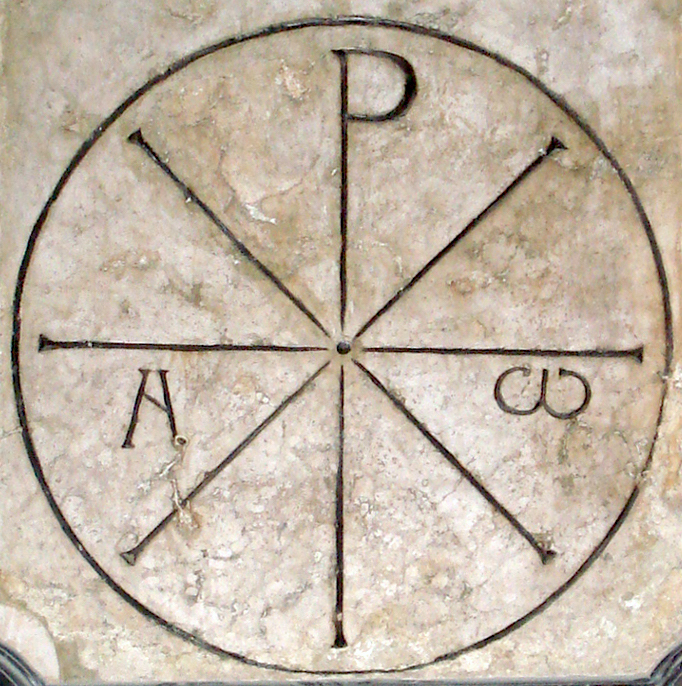
The so-called "Chrismon of Saint Ambrose" (Chrismon Sancti Ambrosii), on display on the eastern wall of Milan Cathedral, a Chi-Rho combined with Alpha and Omega in a circle. According to Landulf of Milan (12th century), it was used by Saint Ambrose to introduce the catechumens to the mysteries of the Christian faith (whence it was called "oracle" or chresmos of St. Ambrose, written by Landulf as crismon, whence the later Neo-Latin term for the Chi-Rho symbol).

== Later usage ==
=== Late antiquity ===
An early visual representation of the connection between the Crucifixion of Jesus and his resurrection, seen in the 4th century sarcophagus of Domitilla in Rome, the use of a wreath around the Chi-Rho symbolizes the victory of the Resurrection over death.

After Constantine, the Chi-Rho became part of the official imperial insignia. Archaeologists have uncovered evidence demonstrating that the Chi-Rho was emblazoned on the helmets of some Late Roman soldiers. Coins and medallions minted during Emperor Constantine's reign also bore the Chi-Rho. By the year 350, the Chi-Rho began to be used on Christian sarcophagi and frescoes. The usurper Magnentius appears to have been the first to use the Chi-Rho monogram flanked by Alpha and Omega, on the reverse of some coins minted in 353. In Roman Britannia, a tesselated mosaic pavement was uncovered at Hinton St. Mary, Dorset, in 1963. On stylistic grounds, it is dated to the 4th century; its central roundel represents a beardless male head and bust draped in a pallium in front of the Chi-Rho symbol, flanked by pomegranates, symbols of eternal life. Another Romano-British Chi-Rho, in fresco, was found at the site of a villa at Lullingstone (illustrated). The symbol was also found on Late Roman Christian signet rings in Britain.

In 2020, archaeologists discovered in Vindolanda in northern England a 5th-century chalice covered in religious iconography, including the Chi-Rho.

=== Insular Gospel books ===
In Insular Gospel books, the beginning of Matthew 1:18, at the end of his account of the genealogy of Christ and introducing his account of the life, so representing the moment of the Incarnation of Christ, was usually marked with a heavily decorated page, where the letters of the first word "Christi" are abbreviated and written in Greek as "XPI", and often almost submerged by decoration. Though the letters are written one after the other and the "X" and "P" not combined in a monogram, these are known as Chi-Rho pages.

Famous examples are in the Book of Kells and Book of Lindisfarne. The "X" was regarded as the crux decussata, a symbol of the cross; this idea is found in the works of Isidore of Seville and other patristic and Early Medieval writers. The Book of Kells has a second Chi-Rho abbreviation on folio 124 in the account of the Crucifixion of Christ, and in some manuscripts the Chi-Rho occurs at the beginning of Matthew rather than mid-text at Matthew 1:18. In some other works like the Carolingian Godescalc Evangelistary, "XPS" in sequential letters, representing "Christus" is given a prominent place.

== In Unicode ==
The Chi Rho symbol has two Unicode codepoints:

- U+2627 ☧ CHI RHO in the Miscellaneous symbols block and
- U+2CE9 ⳩ COPTIC SYMBOL KHI RO in the Coptic block.

== Gallery ==
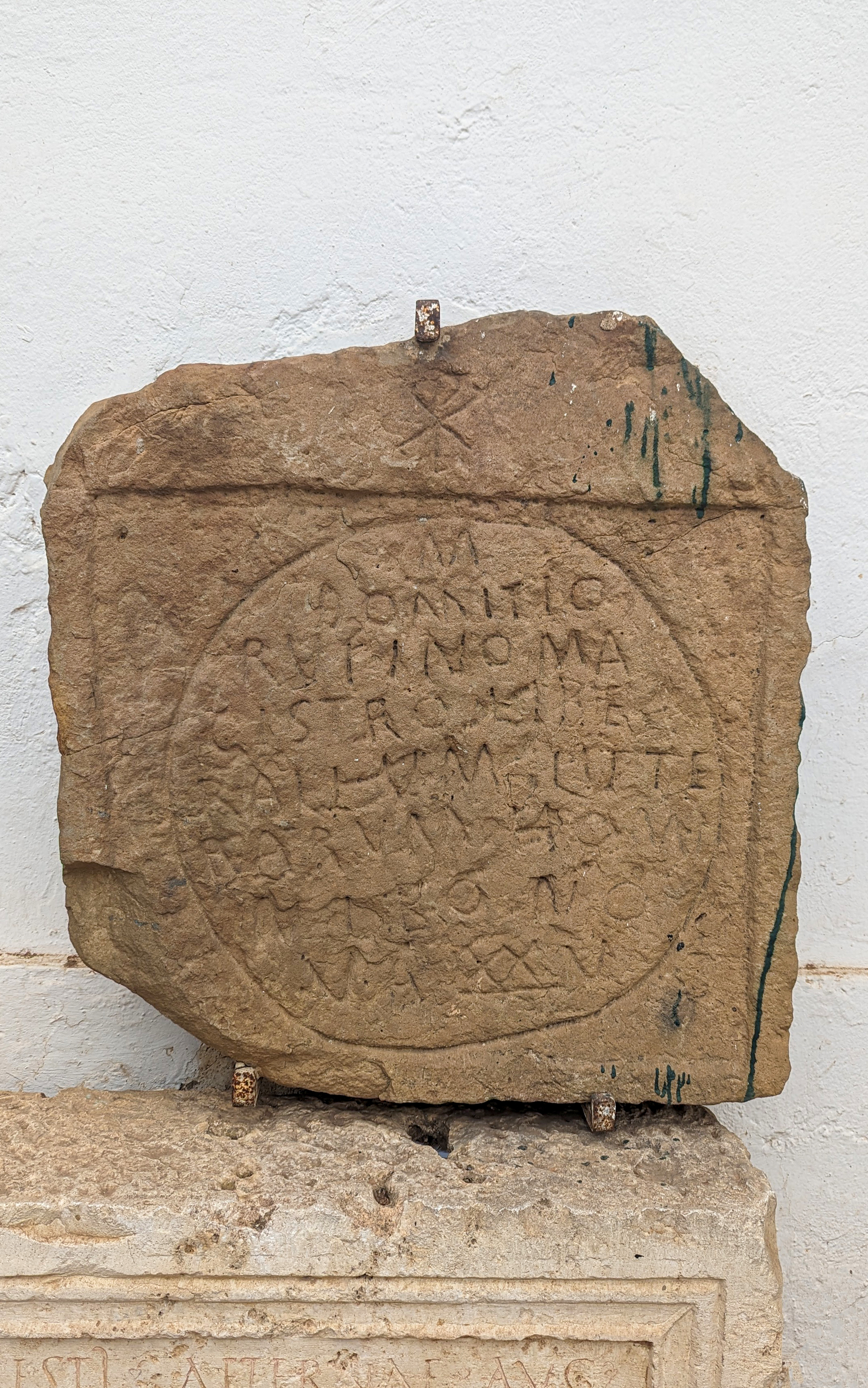
The symbol at the top of the rock, National Museum of Antiquities and Islamic Art, Algiers.

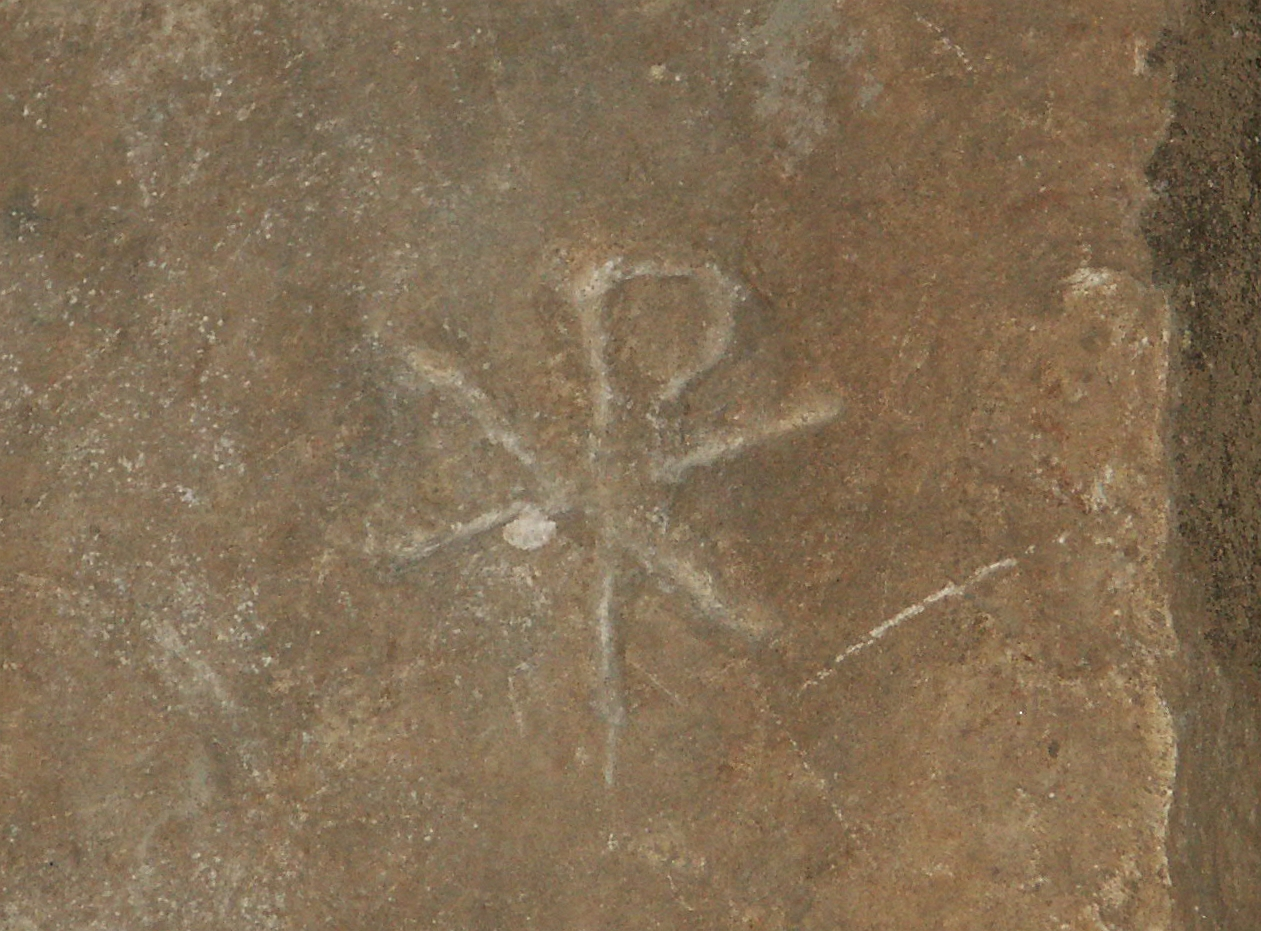
The Chi-Rho symbol ☧, Catacombs of San Callisto, Rome.

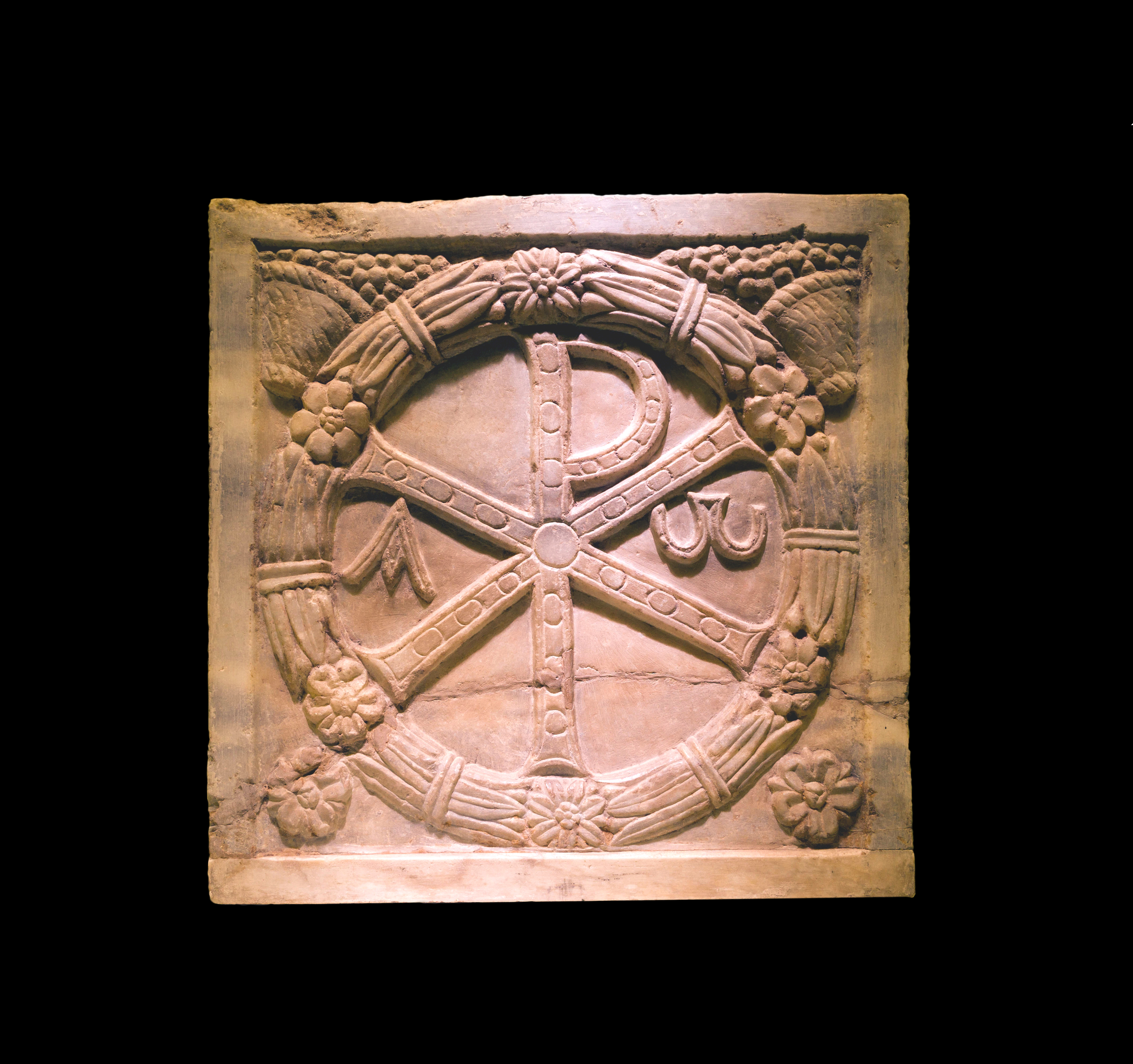
Monogramme of Christ (the Chi Rho) on a plaque of a sarcophagus, 4th-century AD, marble, Musei Vaticani, on display in a temporary exhibition at the Colosseum in Rome, Italy

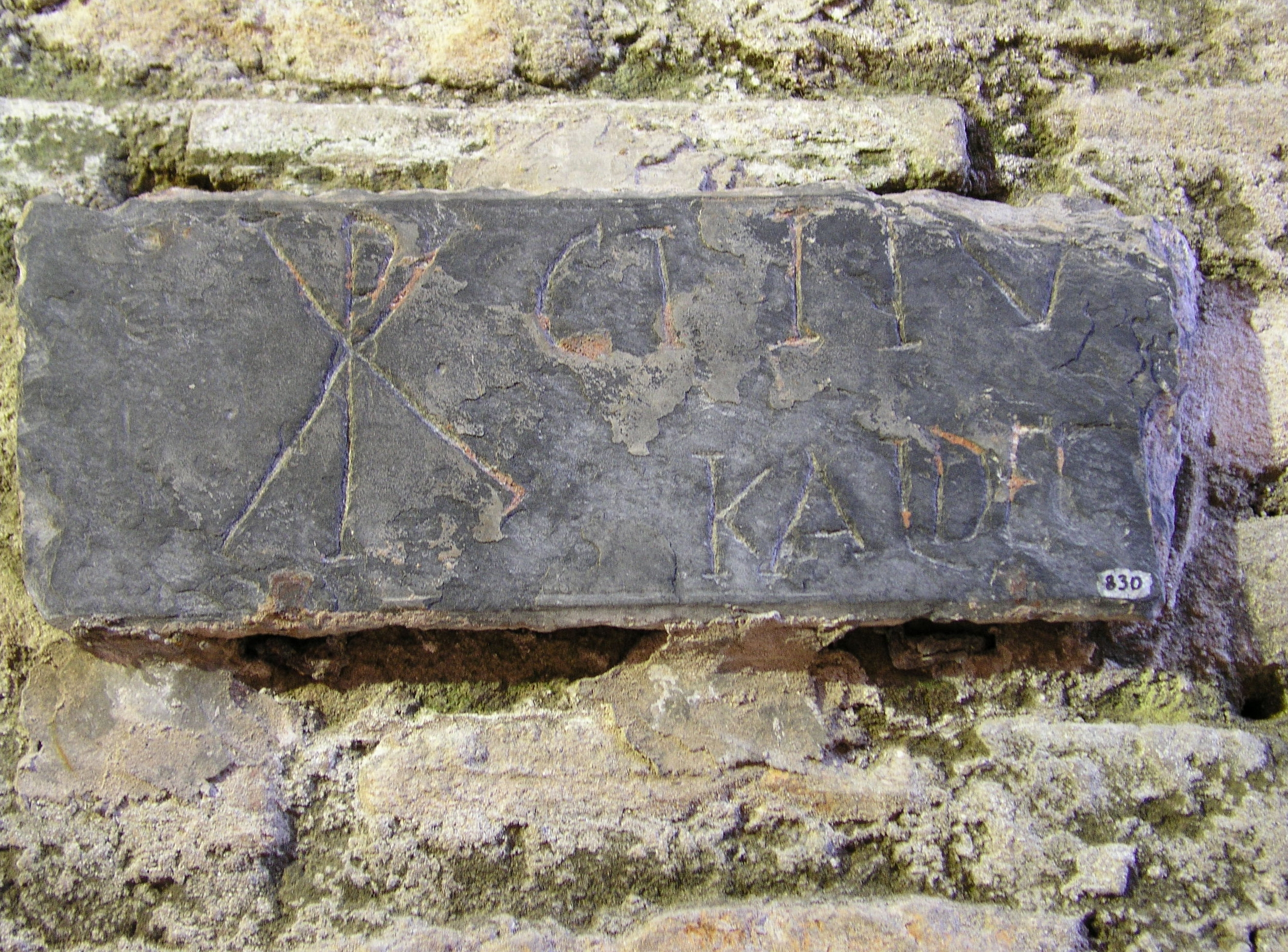
The Chi-Rho symbol ☧, Catacombs of Domitilla, Rome.

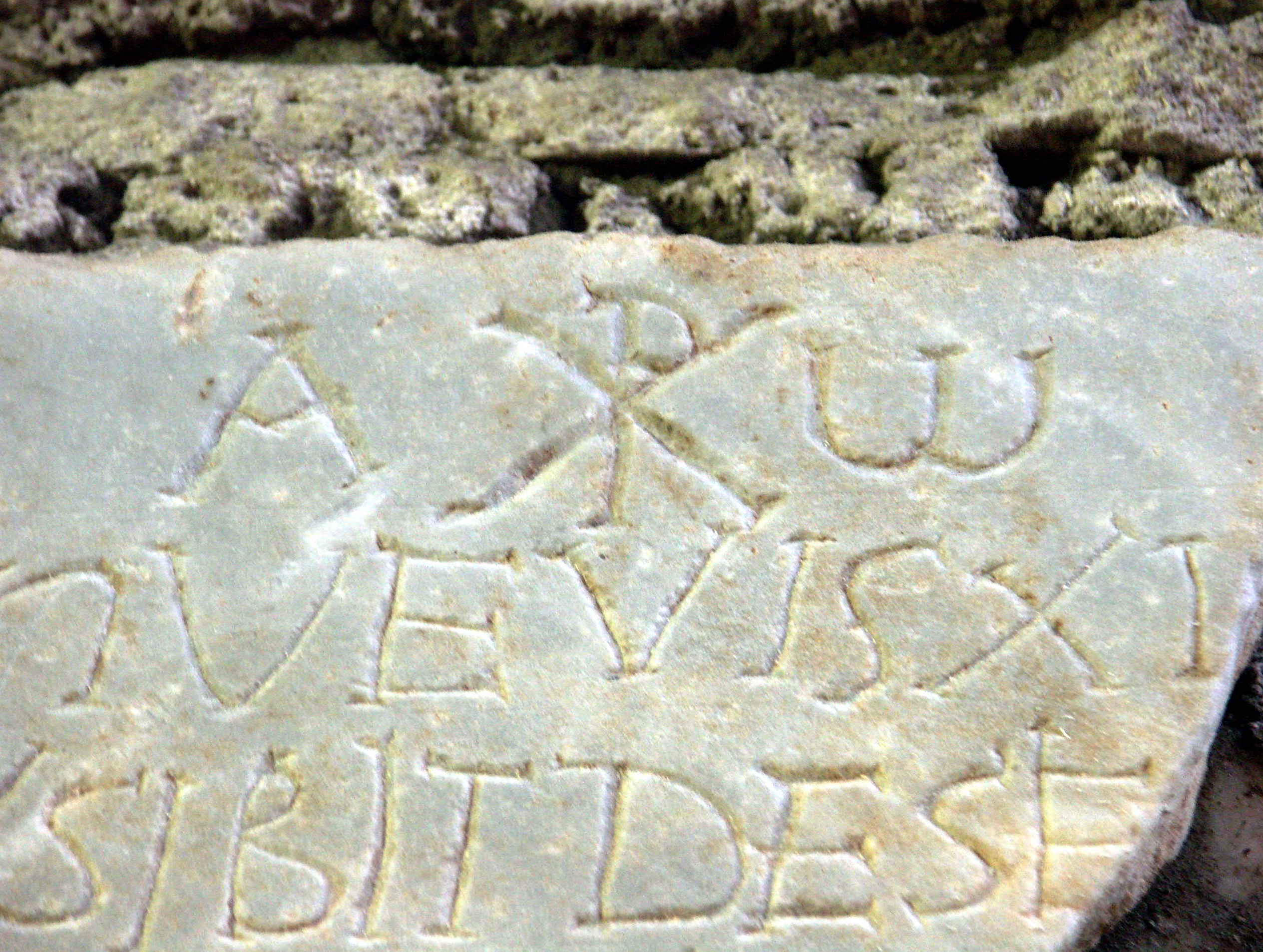
The Chi-Rho symbol ☧ with Alpha and Omega, Catacombs of Domitilla, Rome.

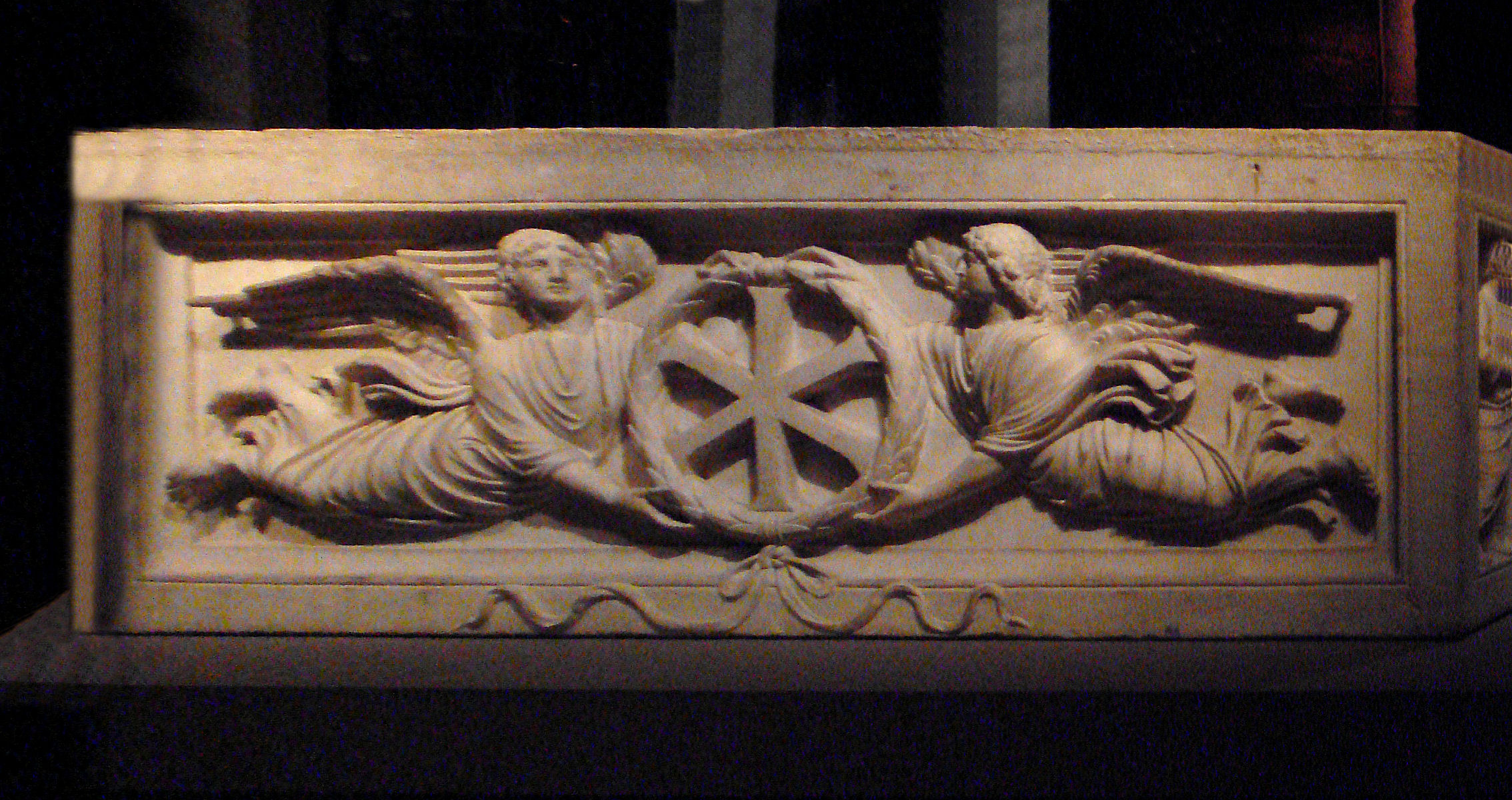
Constantinople Christian sarcophagus with XI monogram, c. 400.

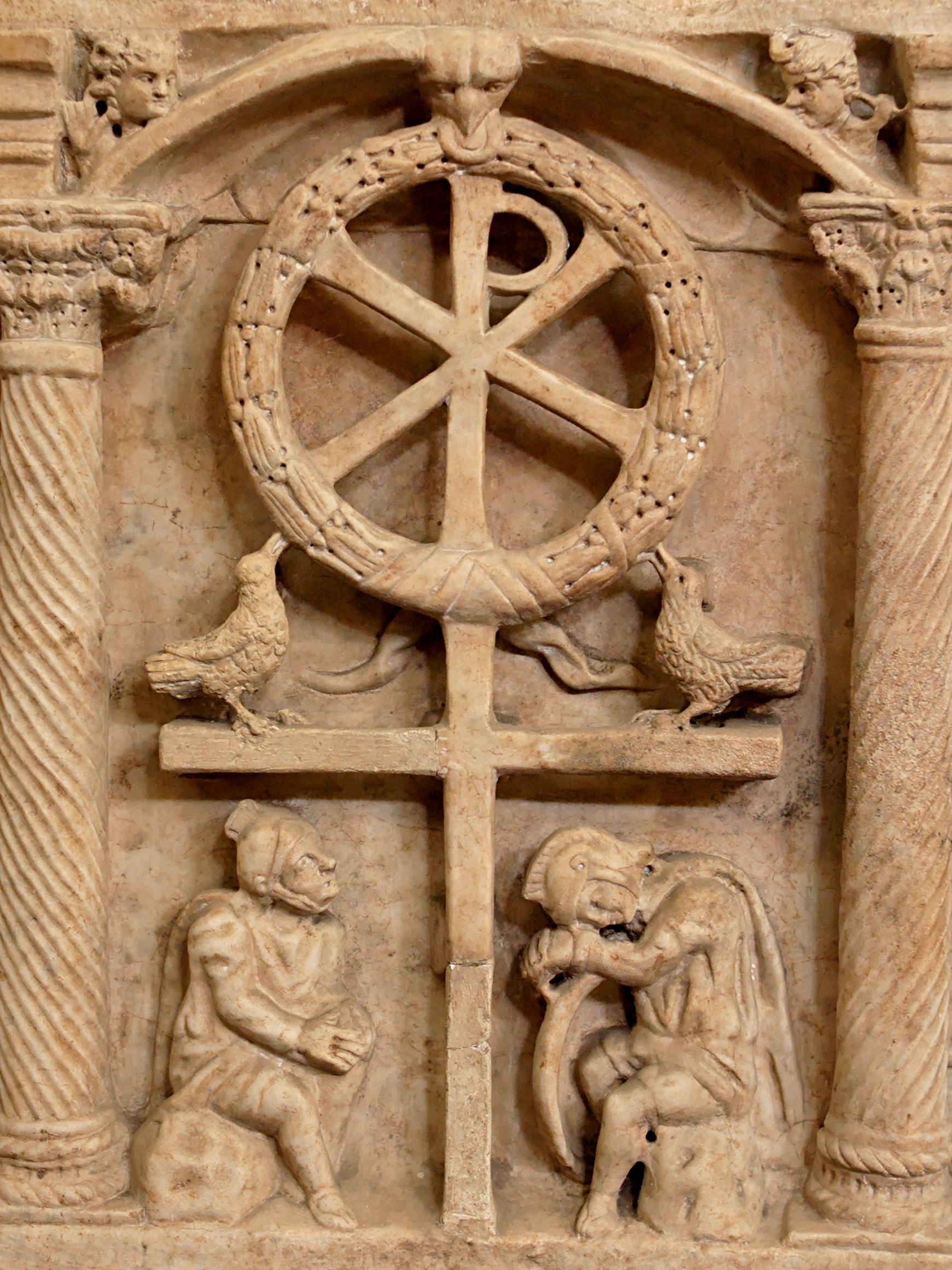
The Chi-Rho with a wreath symbolizing the victory of the Resurrection, above Roman soldiers, c. 350.

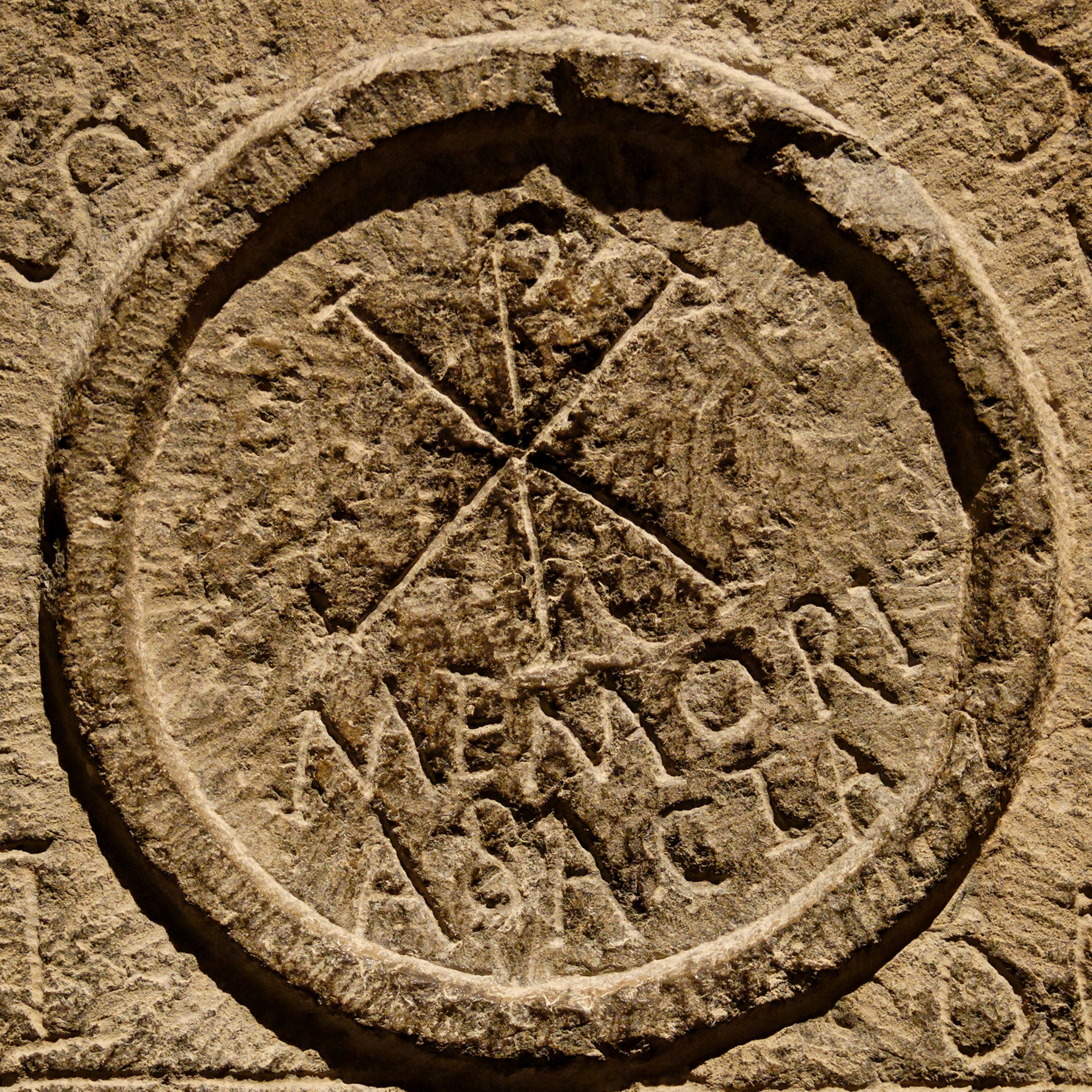
Chi-Rho on a 4th-century altar, Khirbet Um El’Amad, Algeria.

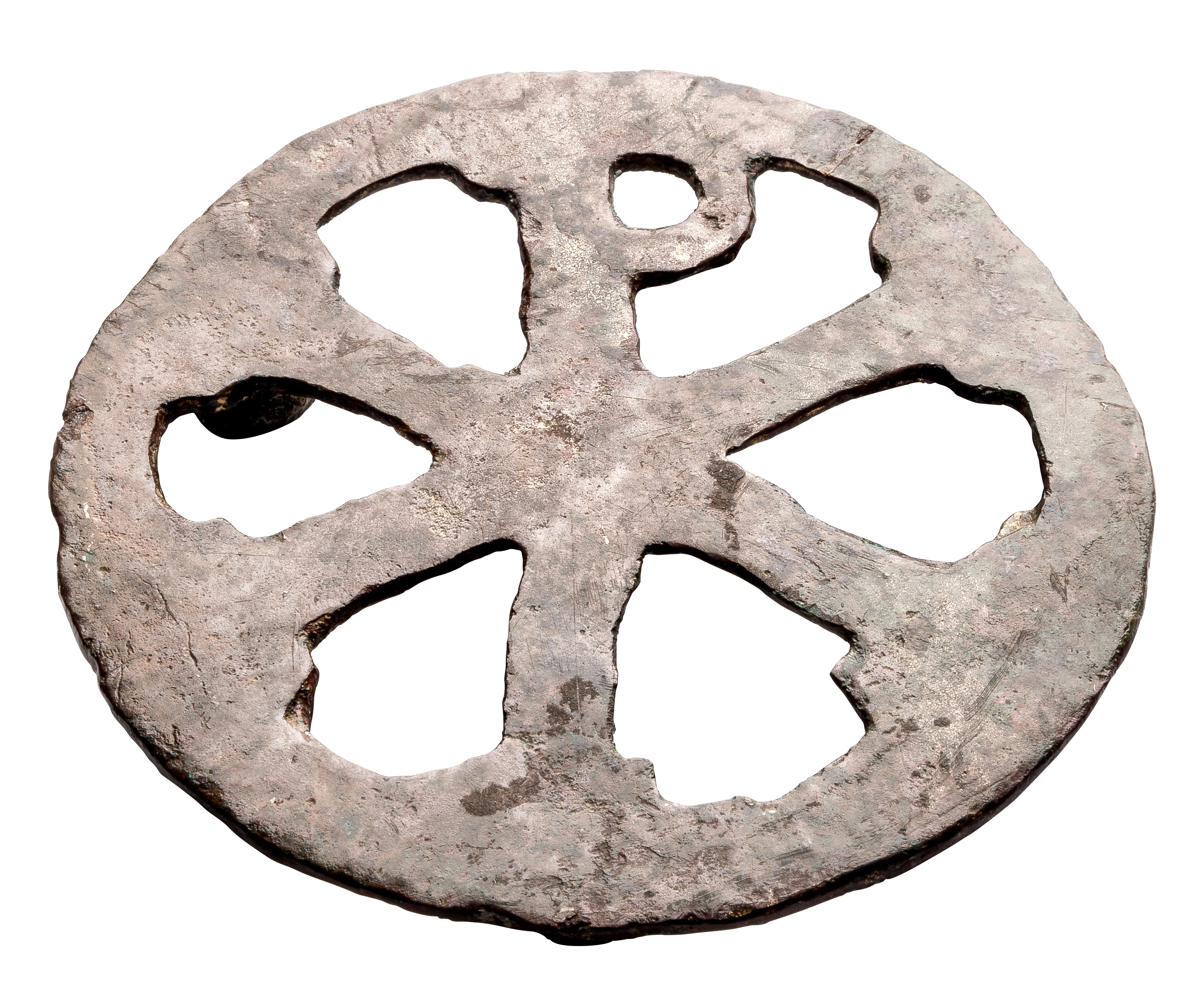
Roman Chi Rho applique in bronze from a Germanic settlement in Neerharen (Belgium), 375-450 AD, Gallo-Roman Museum (Tongeren)

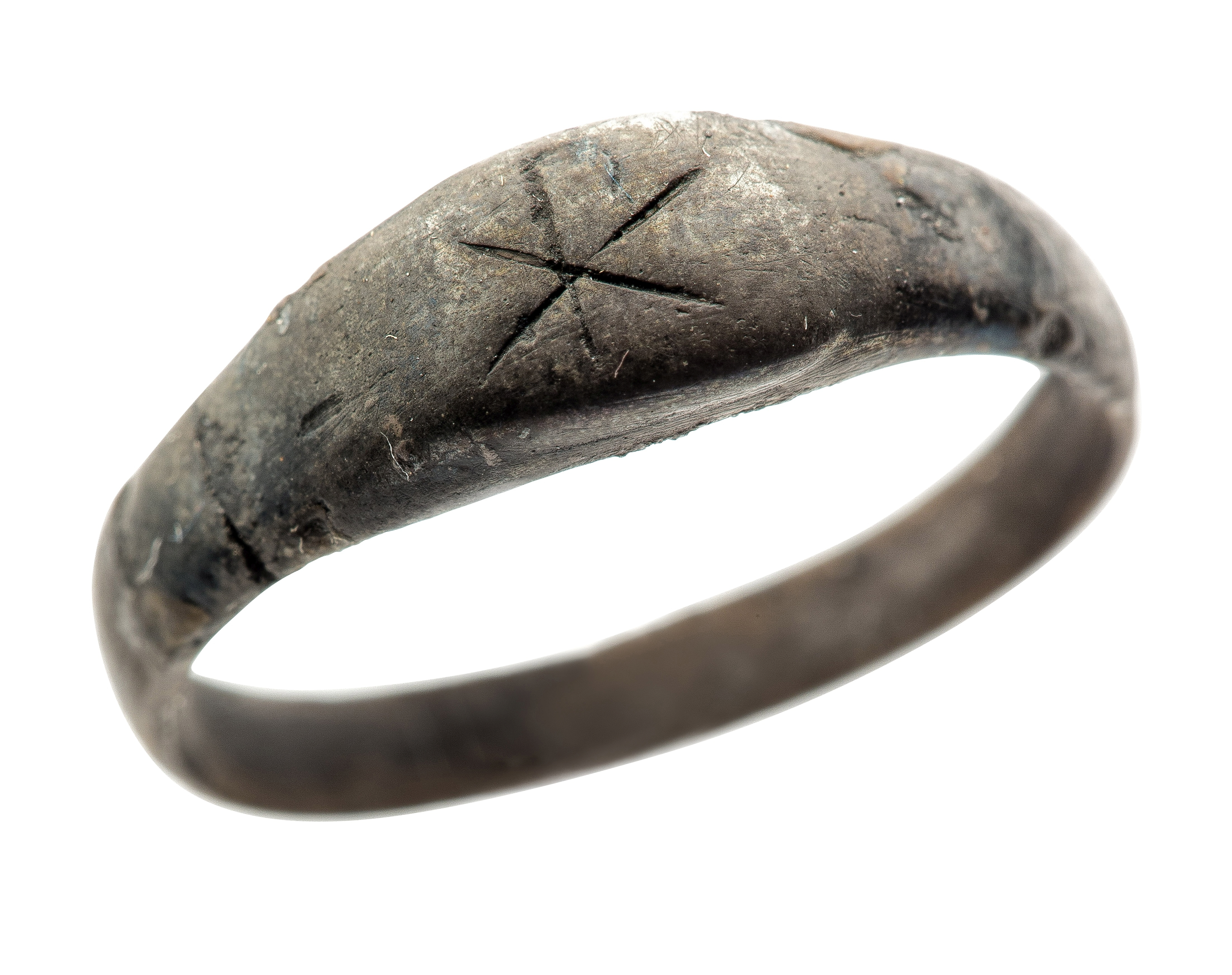
Silver ring with Chi Rho symbol found at a Christian burial site in Late Roman Tongeren (Belgium), 4th century AD, Gallo-Roman Museum (Tongeren)

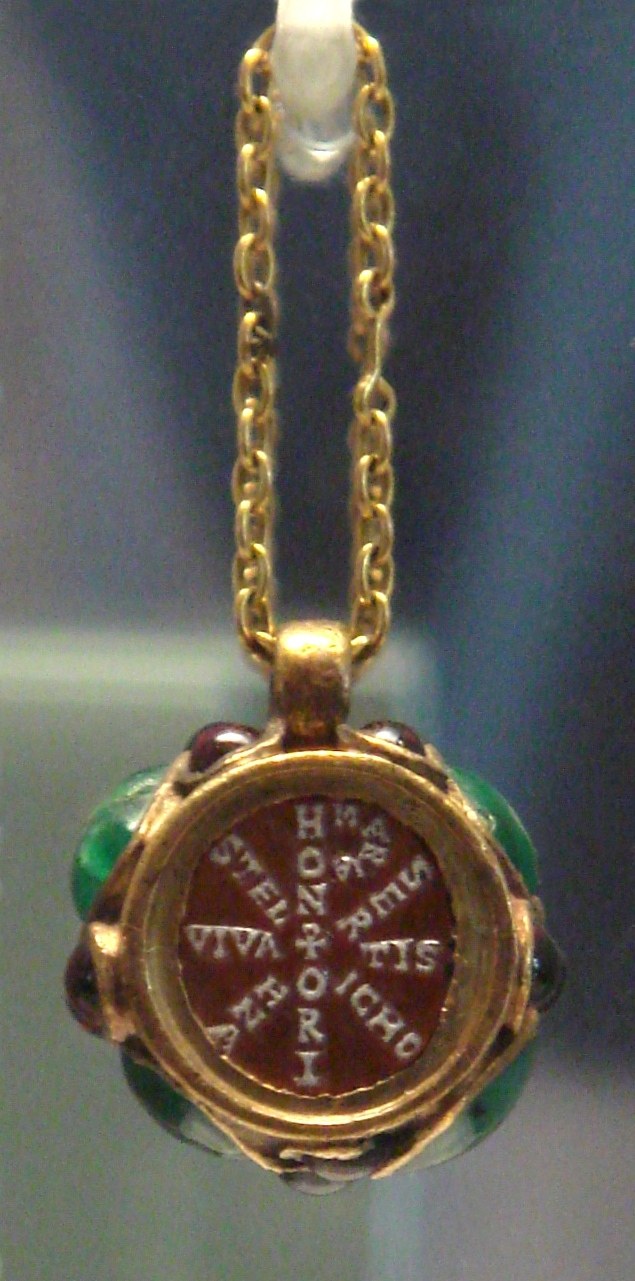
Christian pendant of Maria (398–407), wife of the Emperor Honorius (r. 395–423), with text in the shape of a Chi-Rho, Louvre.

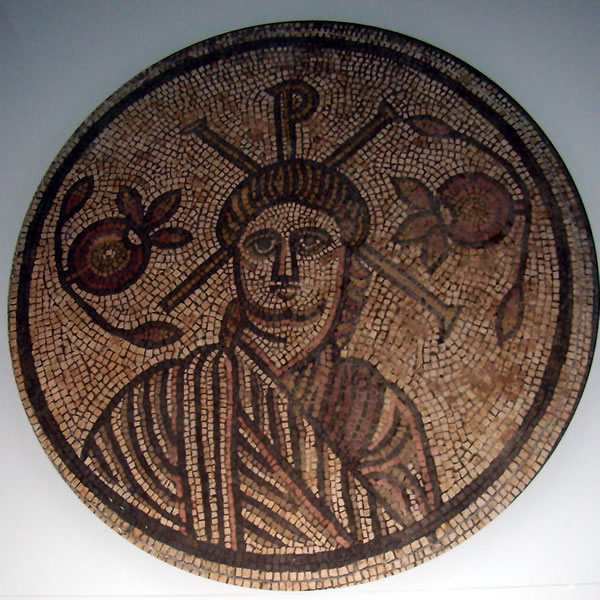
Roman Christian mosaic with Chi-Rho, Hinton St. Mary, England.

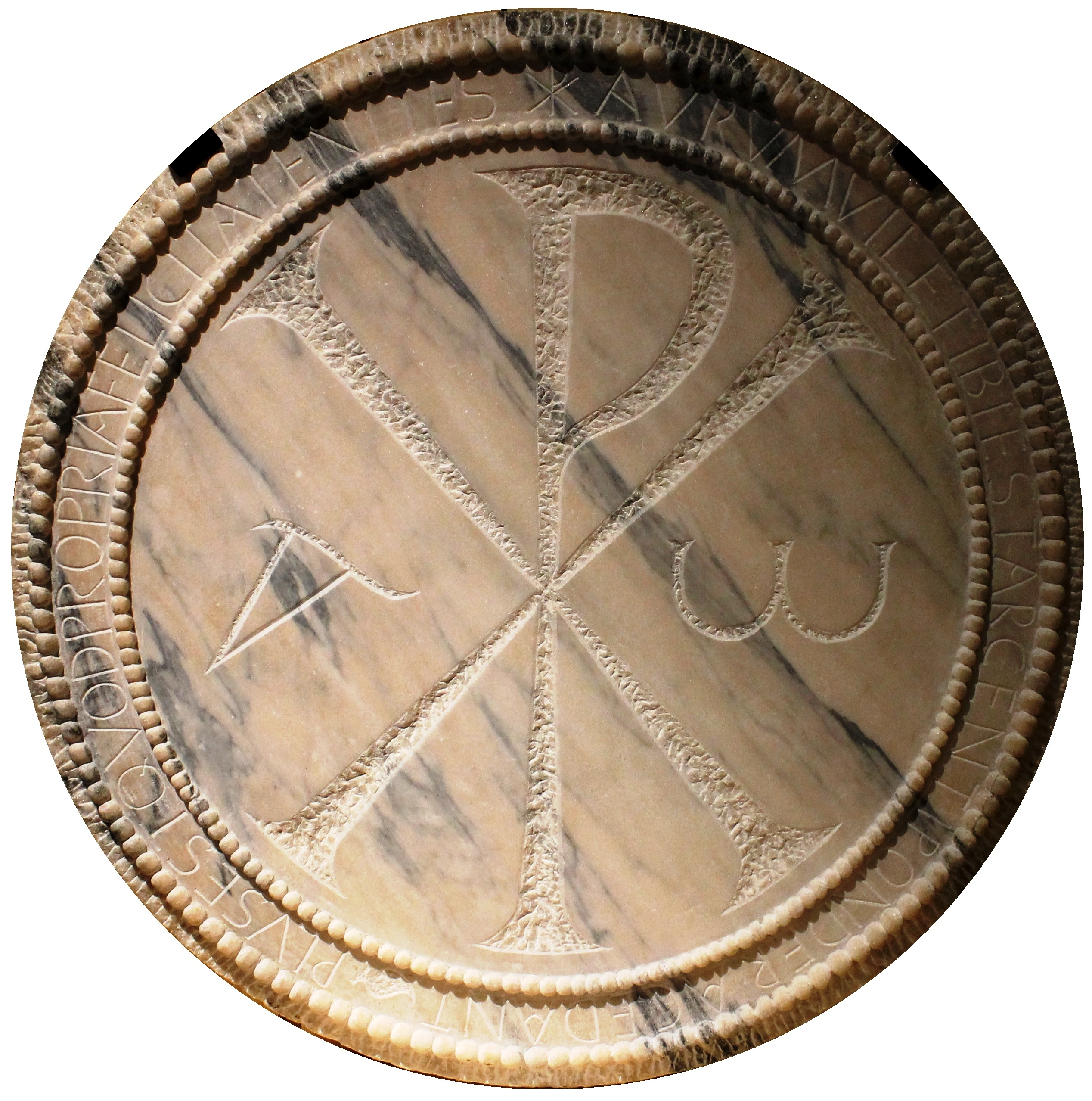
Christian Chi-Rho on a 5th-century marble table, Quiroga, Galicia.

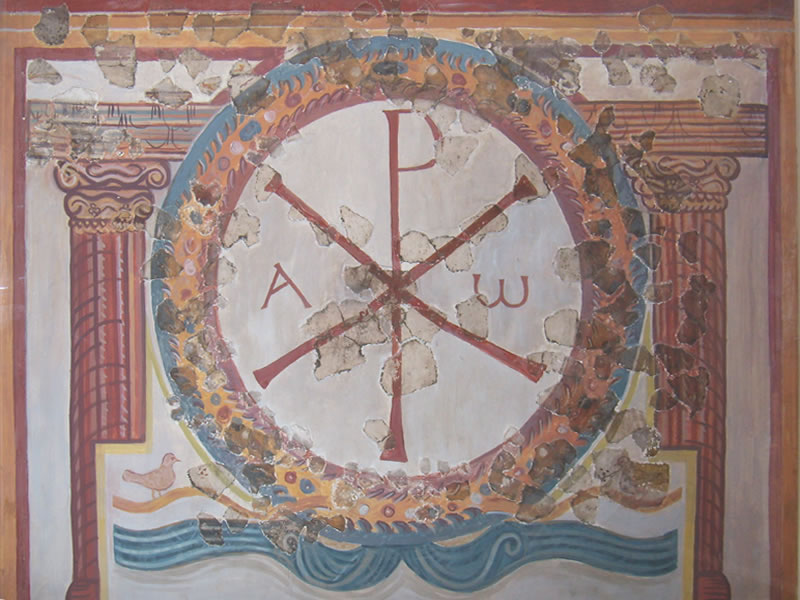
Reconstruction of Chi-Rho fresco from Roman villa at Lullingstone, including Alpha and Omega.

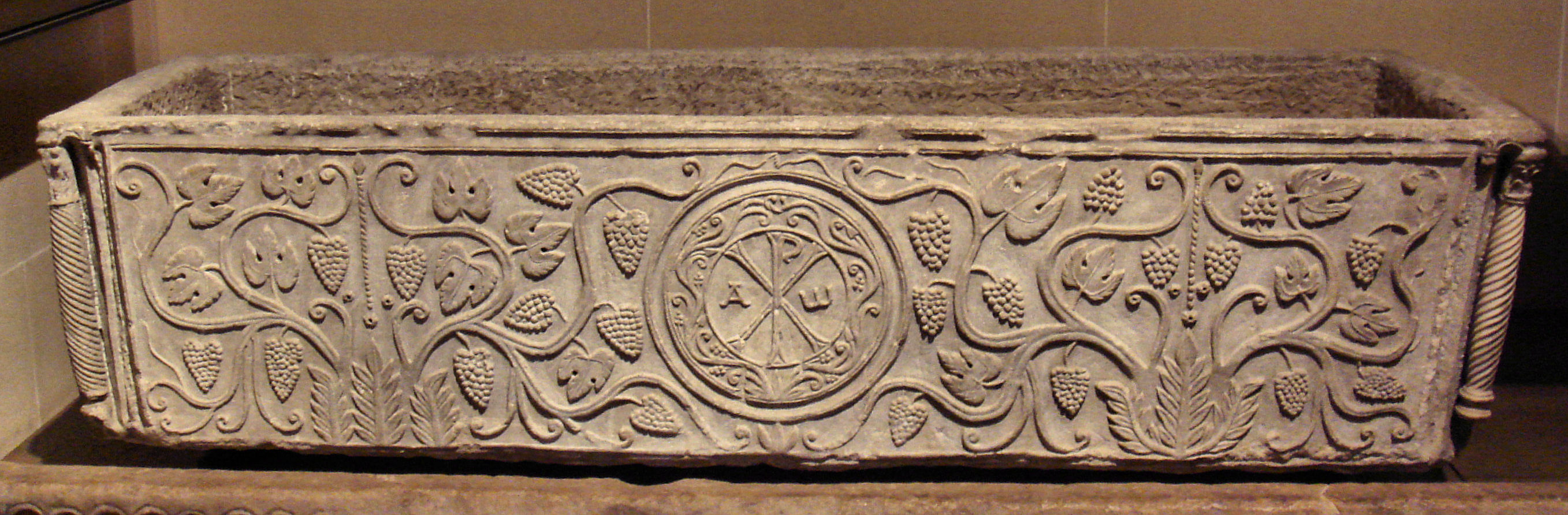
Sarcophagus with Chi-Rho symbol and Alpha and Omega, 6th century, Soissons, France

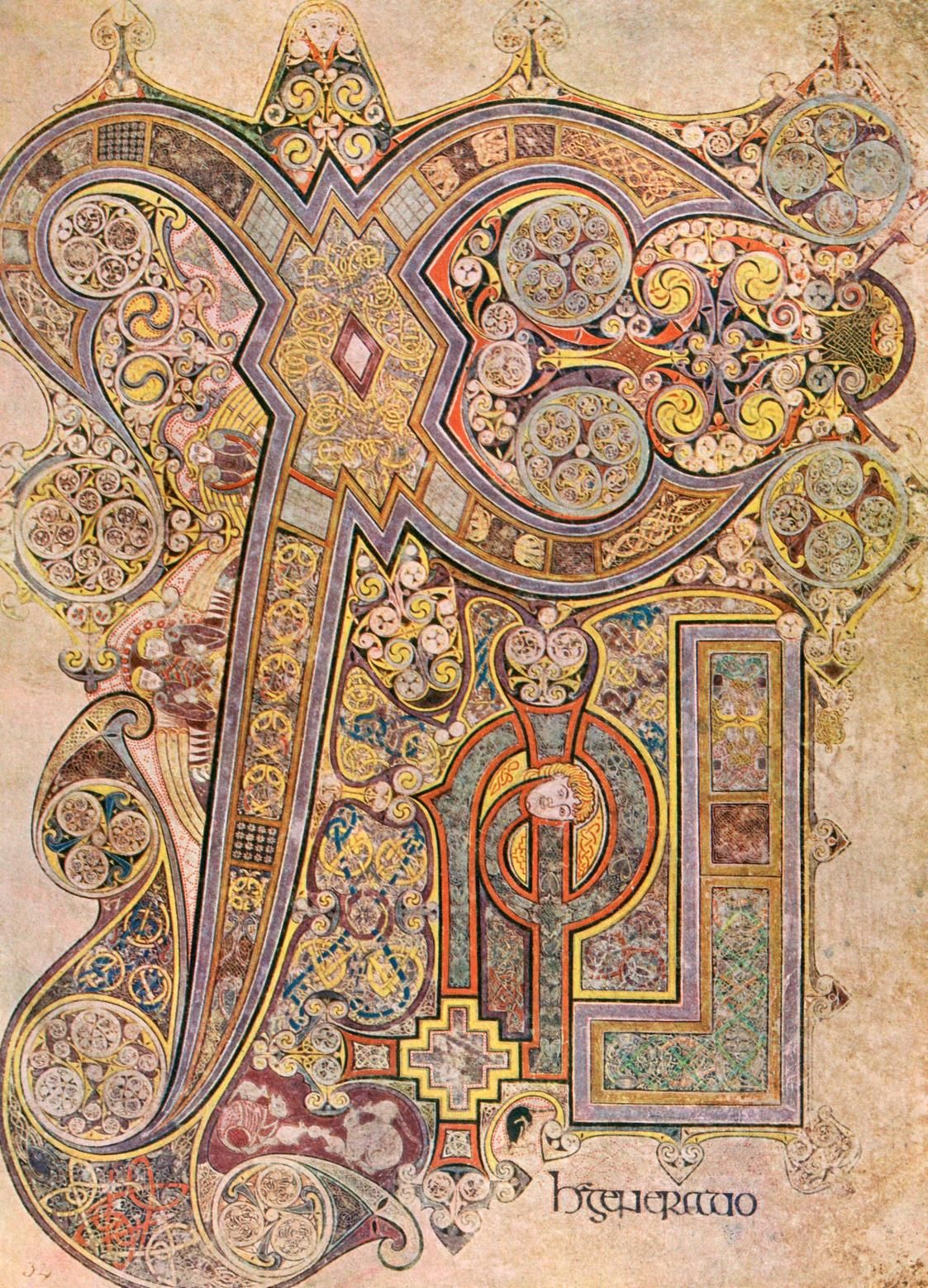
Folio 34r of the Book of Kells is the Chi Rho page, expanding the first two letters of the word Christ.

Sequential "XPS" in the Carolingian Godescalc Evangelistary.

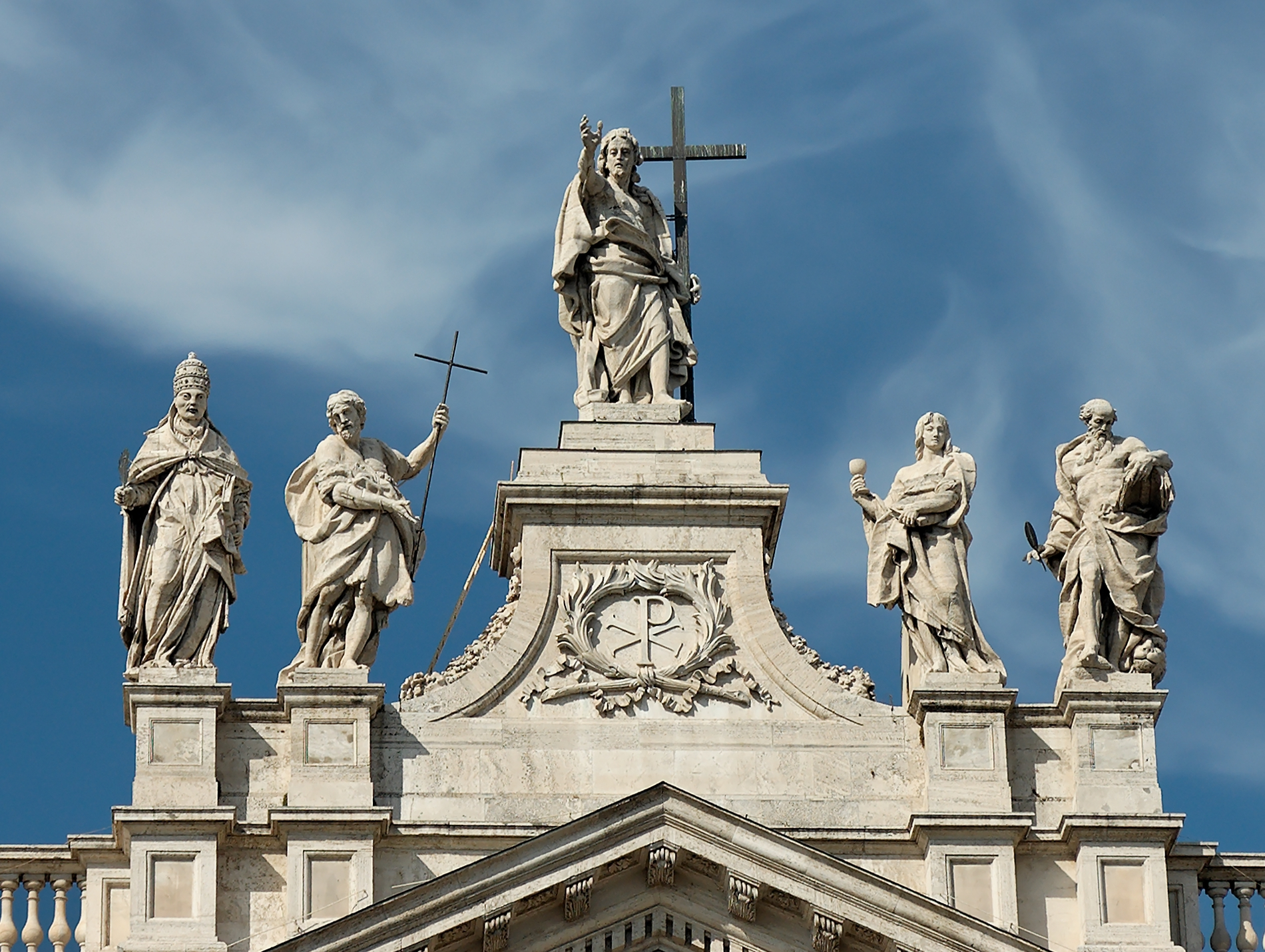
Chi-Rho on the roof of the Basilica of St. John Lateran, Rome.

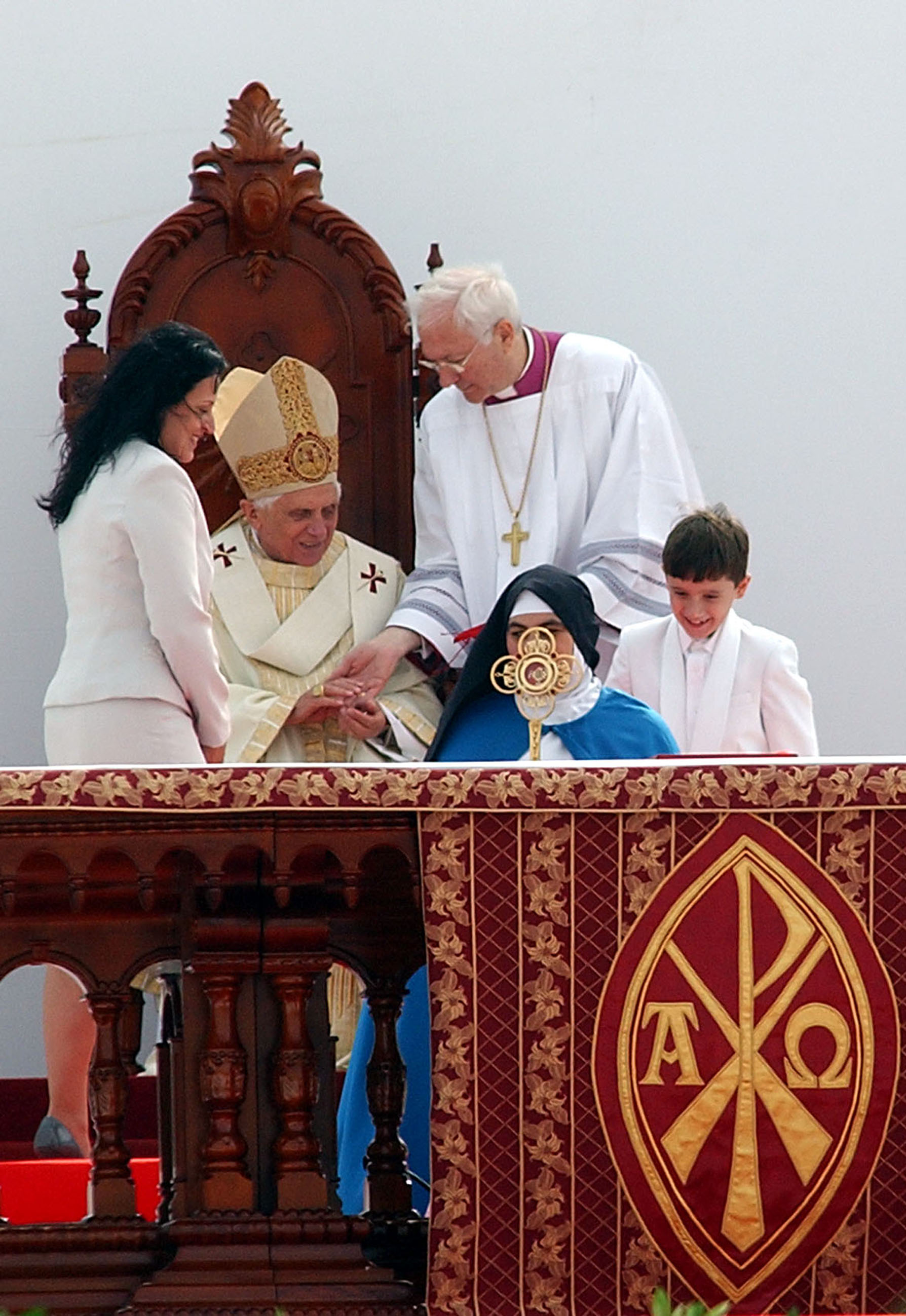
Chi-Rho and Alpha and Omega on a modern Catholic altar.

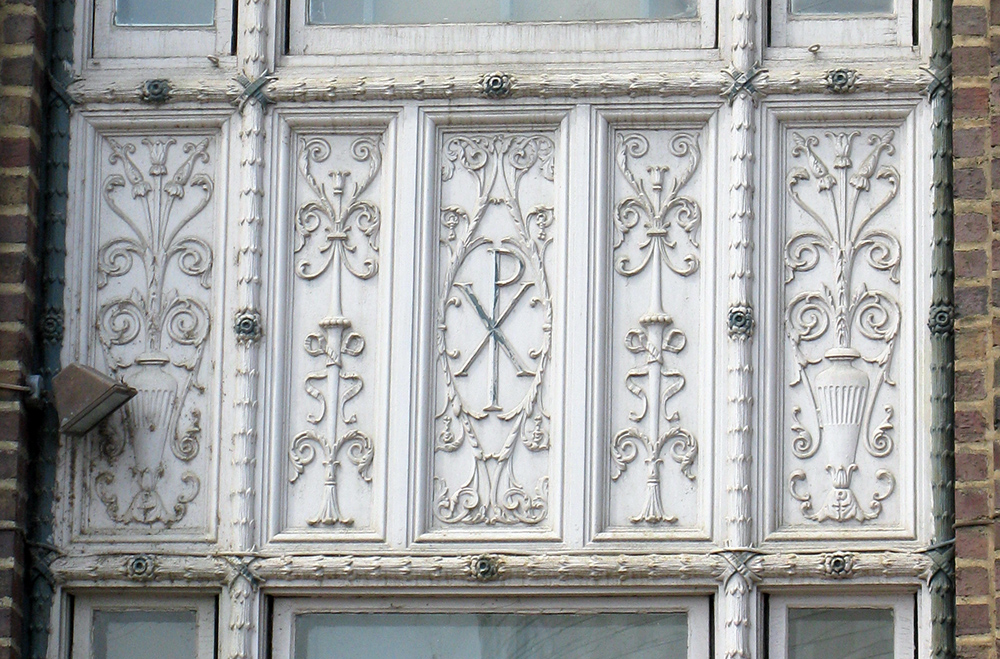
Chi-Rho on YMCA building, Over-the-Rhine, Cincinnati, Ohio.

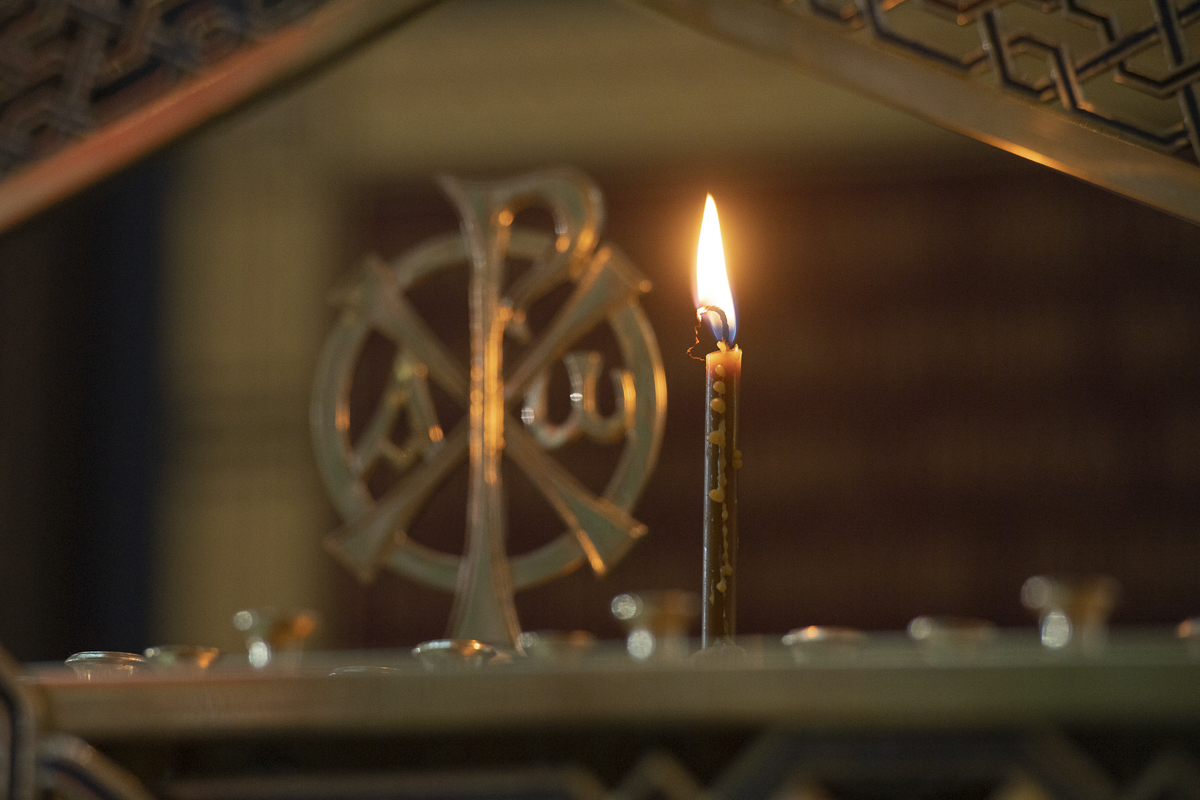
Chi-Rho and Alpha and Omega in the Main Cathedral of the Russian Armed Forces

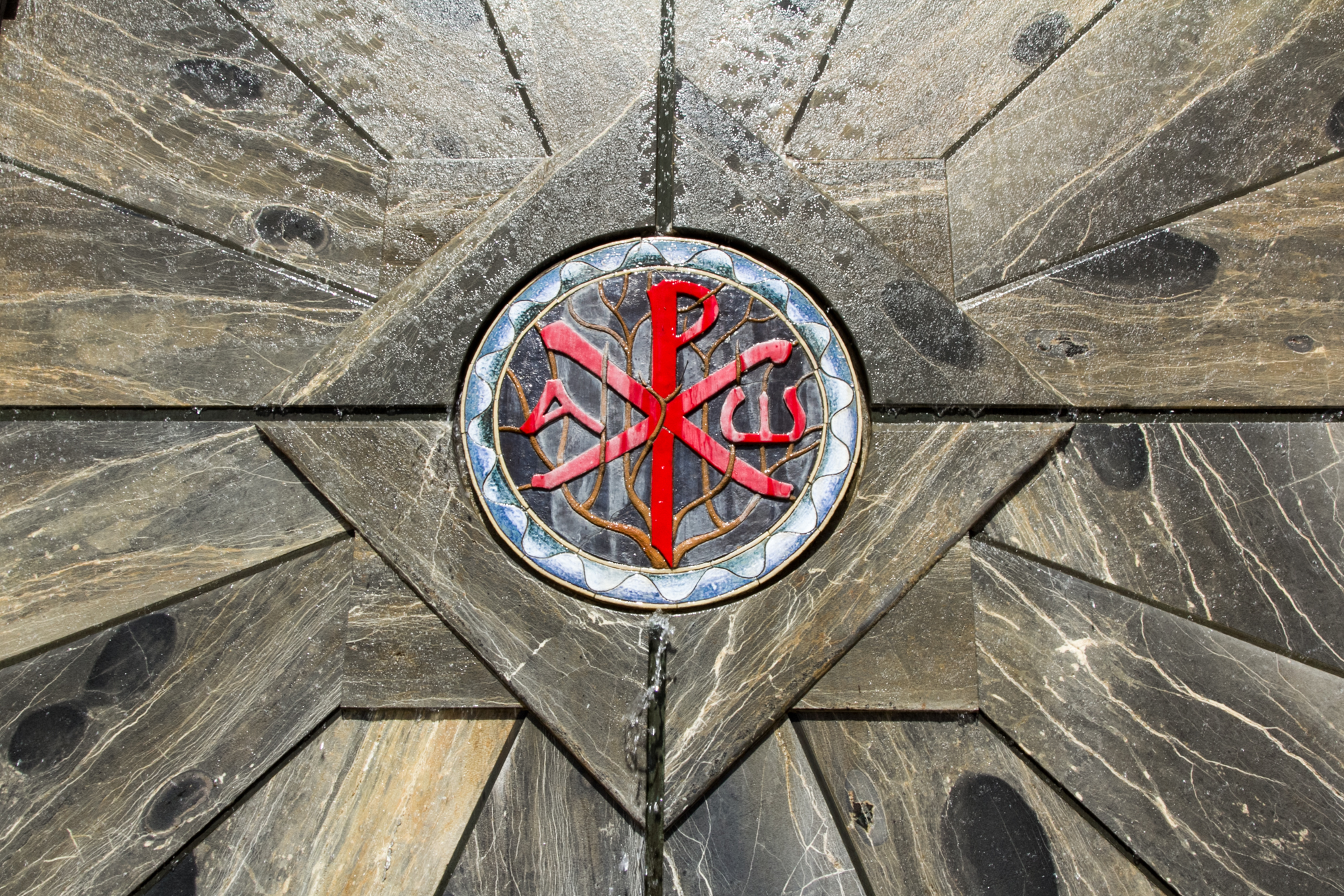
A Chi Rho with the Alpha and Omega near the Basilica of the Annunciation in Nazareth.

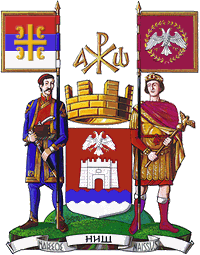
Chi-Rho on the coat of arms of Niš, Serbia, the birthplace of Constantine the Great

== See also ==
- Alpha and Omega
- Chi Rho (disambiguation)
- Christian symbolism
- Christogram
- Ichthys
- Labarum
- Merchant's mark
- Kyrios
- Xmas
