= Xi =

Xi is the 14th letter of the Greek alphabet.

Xi may refer to:

== Arts and entertainment ==
- Xi (alternate reality game), a console-based game
- Xi, Japanese name for the video game Devil Dice
- Saw XI, an upcoming film in the Saw franchise

== People ==
- Xi (surname), any of several Chinese surnames
  - Xi Jinping, General Secretary of the Chinese Communist Party since 2012

== Places ==
- Xi (state), an ancient Chinese state during the Shang and Zhou Dynasties
- Xi County, Henan, China
- Xi County, Shanxi, China
- Xi River, western tributary of the Pearl River in southern China

== Other uses ==
- Xi (business), a Chinese form of business organization
- Xi baryon, a range of baryons with one up or down quark and two heavier quarks
- Xi, a brand name for the 4G LTE mobile telecommunications service operated by NTT DoCoMo in Japan
- Xi (apartment), a brand name for some apartments constructed by GS Construction in Korea.
- The inactive X chromosome in therian female mammals.

== See also ==
- XI (disambiguation)
- 11 (disambiguation)
- Xi people
- Shuang Xi (双喜, written 囍), a Chinese calligraphic design
- Hsi (disambiguation) — "Xi" and "Hsi" are different transliterations of the same sound in Mandarin Chinese
- Xi, a Latin digraph used in British English to write the sound /kʃ/
