= Chi Rho (disambiguation) =

Chi Rho is the monogram ☧ representing "Christ".

Chi Rho may also refer to:

- ☧-bearing military banner labarum of fourth-century and later Roman emperors
- Chi Rho, chorus at Wake Forest University

== See also ==
- Cairo, the capital of Egypt
- Chiro (disambiguation)
