= Hoptasia =

Hoptasia is a word derived from the Greek ὀπτασία meaning "a vision, supernatural appearance, apparition". Its use in English is limited to a few specific contexts: in the Bible (Luke 24:23), it refers to the angels seen by the women visiting Christ's grave, and in Christian legend it is used to indicate the vision of the Chi-Rho (or True Cross, depending on the version) seen by Constantine I.
