= HS1 (disambiguation) =

HS1 or HS-1 may refer to:

== Transport ==
- High Speed 1, the Channel Tunnel Rail Link running from London to France
  - HS1 Limited, also called London St. Pancras Highspeed, the private company operating the High Speed 1
- HS1, Formula One racing car built by the German team ATS
- HS-1, designation of the Fox Chase Rapid Transit Line, an experimental rail line in Pennsylvania
- HS-1, a variant of the Mrigasheer, a glider built by the Indian Civil Aviation Department

== Military ==
- Curtiss HS-1, a US Navy flying boat of World War I
- HS-1, a former US Navy helicopter squadron known as the Seahorses, inactivated in 1997

== Science and technology ==
- HS-1 (satellite), Pakistani satellite for earth observation
- HS1, a Hypersonic Gun tunnel at Imperial College, London, part of the UK's National Wind Tunnel Facility
- HS1, an electrical stunning system produced by British company Ace Aquatec, used to ensure fish welfare at slaughter
- HS1, a multimedia headset manufactured by US company Plantronics
- HS1, a headset microphone manufactured by Australian company Røde Microphones
- HS1, a designation for a type of automotive light bulb for motorcycles
- HS-1, designation of one of the plutonium-gallium hemispheres used for the core in the first nuclear test detonation, codenamed Trinity
- HS-1, a model of the Weisscam digital high-speed camera, manufactured by German company P+S Technik
- HS-1, or Heteroscorpine, a polypeptide belonging to the Scorpine toxin family
- HS-1, or Hymenistatin, a cyclic peptide

== Music ==
- Harry Styles (album), the 2017 debut album by Harry Styles

== Other ==
- HS1, a part of the British HS postcode area

== See also ==
- HSI (disambiguation)
