= Number 11 =

Number 11, #11 or variations may refer to:

- Number 11 (novel), by Jonathan Coe
- Number 11, a 1952 painting by Jackson Pollock, later known as Blue Poles
- 11 (number), a natural number
- 11 Downing Street, the residence of the British Chancellor of the Exchequer
- In the batting order (cricket), the last batsman, sometimes referred to as the last man Jack

== See also ==
- Eleven (disambiguation)
