= 11:11 =

11:11, Eleven Eleven, or variations of the two, may refer to:

== Dates ==
- 1111
- Armistice of 11 November 1918 or "the eleventh of the eleventh"
- November 11
- November 1911
- November 2011

== Music ==
=== Albums ===
- 11:11, an album by Danny Romero (2018)
- 11:11 (Biig Piig album) (2025)
- 11:11 (Chris Brown album) (2023)
- 11:11 (Come album) (1992)
- 11:11 (Mac Lethal album) (2007)
- 11:11 (Maluma album) (2019)
- 11:11 (Maria Taylor album) (2005)
- 11:11 (Paula Fernandes album) (2023)
- 11:11 (Pinegrove album) (2022)
- 11:11 (Regina Spektor album) (2001)
- 11:11 (Rodrigo y Gabriela album) (2009)
- 11:11 (Sasha Sökol album) (1997)
- Eleven Eleven (Dave Alvin album)
- Eleven Eleven (Dinosaur Pile-Up album) (2016)

=== Songs ===
- "11:11", a single by Austin Mahone
- "11 eleven", a 2003 single credited to Cyber X feat. misono
- "11:11", a song by Hanzel Und Gretyl from the 2003 album Über Alles
- "11/11", a song by Team Sleep from the 2005 album Team Sleep
- "11:11", a song by Rufus Wainwright from the 2003 album Want One
- "11:11", a song by Andrew Bird's Bowl of Fire from the album The Swimming Hour
- "11:11", a song by Arkells from the 2014 album High Noon
- "11:11", a song by Kind of Like Spitting from the 2000 album $100 Room
- "11:11", a song by Dinosaur Pile-Up from the 2016 album Eleven Eleven
- "11:11" (Taeyeon song) (2016)
- "11:11 PM", a song by All-American Rejects from the 2005 album Move Along
- "11:11" (Megara song) (2024)
- "Condition 11:11", a song by Defiance, Ohio from the 2006 album The Great Depression
- "Eleven Eleven", a song by Conan Gray from the 2025 album Wishbone
- "11:11", a song by Ben Barnes, released as a single on 17. September 2021

=== Other uses in music ===
- Eleveneleven, record label founded by Ellen DeGeneres

== Film ==
- Eleven Eleven (2018 film), a 2018 American sci-fi comedy film
- 11:11 (film), a 2022 Egyptian drama film

== Other uses ==
- 11:11 (numerology)
- 11.11, also known as Singles Day, a day for unmarried people, popular among Chinese youth
- 1.1.1.1, a free Domain Name System (DNS) service by Cloudflare

== See also ==
- 11 (number)
- Chapter 11, Title 11, United States Code
