= Coptic (Unicode block) =

- Range: U+2C80..U+2CFF (128 code points)
- Plane: BMP
- Scripts: Coptic
- Major alphabets: Coptic
- Assigned: 123 code points
- Unused: 5 reserved code points

Unicode version history
- 4.1 (2005): 114 (+114)
- 5.2 (2009): 121 (+7)
- 6.1 (2012): 123 (+2)

Unicode documentation
- Code chart ∣ Web page

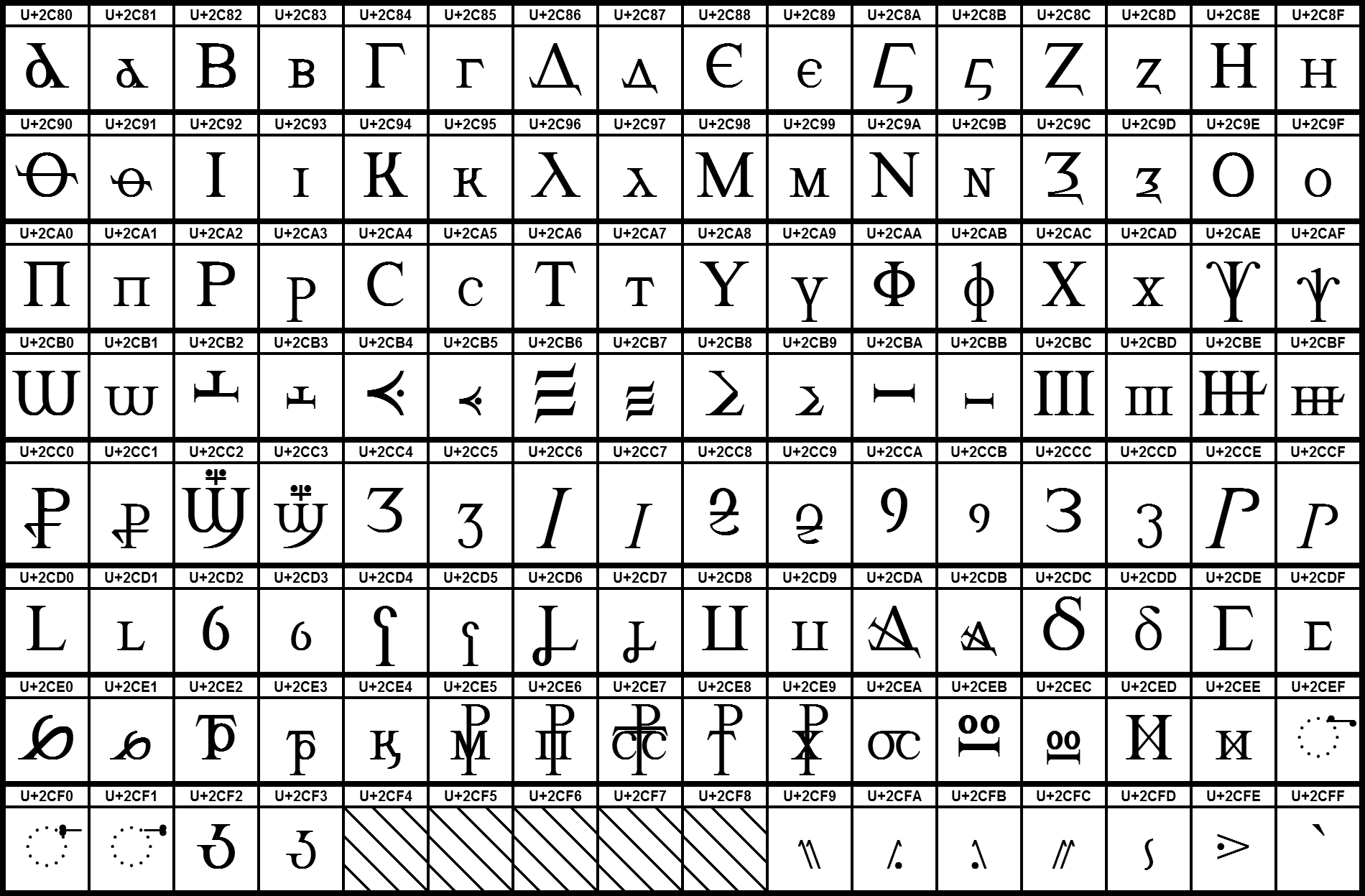
Graphical representation of the Coptic Unicode block

Coptic is a Unicode block used with the Greek and Coptic block to write the Coptic language. Prior to version 4.1 of the Unicode Standard, the "Greek and Coptic" block was used exclusively to write Coptic text, but Greek and Coptic letter forms are contrastive in many scholarly works, necessitating their disunification. Any specifically Coptic letters in the Greek and Coptic block are not reproduced in the Coptic Unicode block.

== Block ==
Coptic^{[1]}^{[2]} Official Unicode Consortium code chart (PDF)
	0	1	2	3	4	5	6	7	8	9	A	B	C	D	E	F
U+2C8x	Ⲁ	ⲁ	Ⲃ	ⲃ	Ⲅ	ⲅ	Ⲇ	ⲇ	Ⲉ	ⲉ	Ⲋ	ⲋ	Ⲍ	ⲍ	Ⲏ	ⲏ
U+2C9x	Ⲑ	ⲑ	Ⲓ	ⲓ	Ⲕ	ⲕ	Ⲗ	ⲗ	Ⲙ	ⲙ	Ⲛ	ⲛ	Ⲝ	ⲝ	Ⲟ	ⲟ
U+2CAx	Ⲡ	ⲡ	Ⲣ	ⲣ	Ⲥ	ⲥ	Ⲧ	ⲧ	Ⲩ	ⲩ	Ⲫ	ⲫ	Ⲭ	ⲭ	Ⲯ	ⲯ
U+2CBx	Ⲱ	ⲱ	Ⲳ	ⲳ	Ⲵ	ⲵ	Ⲷ	ⲷ	Ⲹ	ⲹ	Ⲻ	ⲻ	Ⲽ	ⲽ	Ⲿ	ⲿ
U+2CCx	Ⳁ	ⳁ	Ⳃ	ⳃ	Ⳅ	ⳅ	Ⳇ	ⳇ	Ⳉ	ⳉ	Ⳋ	ⳋ	Ⳍ	ⳍ	Ⳏ	ⳏ
U+2CDx	Ⳑ	ⳑ	Ⳓ	ⳓ	Ⳕ	ⳕ	Ⳗ	ⳗ	Ⳙ	ⳙ	Ⳛ	ⳛ	Ⳝ	ⳝ	Ⳟ	ⳟ
U+2CEx	Ⳡ	ⳡ	Ⳣ	ⳣ	ⳤ	⳥	⳦	⳧	⳨	⳩	⳪	Ⳬ	ⳬ	Ⳮ	ⳮ	⳯
U+2CFx	⳰	⳱	Ⳳ	ⳳ						⳹	⳺	⳻	⳼	⳽	⳾	⳿
Notes: 1. As of Unicode version 17.0; 2. Grey areas indicate non-assigned code points

== History ==
The following Unicode-related documents record the purpose and process of defining specific characters in the Coptic block:

Version	Final code points (Note: Proposed code points and characters names may differ from final code points and names)	Count	L2 ID	WG2 ID	Document
4.1	U+2C80..2CEA, 2CF9..2CFF	114	L2/98-022 (html, pdf)	N1658	Everson, Michael (1997-12-08), Proposal to encode Coptic in ISO/IEC 10646
4.1	U+2C80..2CEA, 2CF9..2CFF	114	L2/98-039		Aliprand, Joan; Winkler, Arnold (1998-02-24), "3.A.4.a. Disunificaiton of Coptic", Preliminary Minutes - UTC #74 & L2 #171, Mountain View, CA - December 5, 1997
4.1	U+2C80..2CEA, 2CF9..2CFF	114	L2/98-070		Aliprand, Joan; Winkler, Arnold, "3.A.2. item b. Coptic", Minutes of the joint UTC and L2 meeting from the meeting in Cupertino, February 25-27, 1998
4.1	U+2C80..2CEA, 2CF9..2CFF	114	L2/98-286	N1703	Umamaheswaran, V. S.; Ksar, Mike (1998-07-02), "8.9.2", Unconfirmed Meeting Minutes, WG 2 Meeting #34, Redmond, WA, USA; 1998-03-16--20
4.1	U+2C80..2CEA, 2CF9..2CFF	114	L2/00-128		Bunz, Carl-Martin (2000-03-01), Scripts from the Past in Future Versions of Unicode
4.1	U+2C80..2CEA, 2CF9..2CFF	114	L2/00-411		Emmel, Stephen (2000-10-05), Coptic -- resolutions from the meeting in Leiden, September 2, 2000
4.1	U+2C80..2CEA, 2CF9..2CFF	114	L2/02-051		McGowan, Rick (2002-02-03), Coptic Disunification
4.1	U+2C80..2CEA, 2CF9..2CFF	114	L2/02-205	N2444	Everson, Michael; Mansour, Kamal (2002-05-08), Coptic supplementation in the BMP
4.1	U+2C80..2CEA, 2CF9..2CFF	114	L2/02-166R2		Moore, Lisa (2002-08-09), "Consensus 91-C12", UTC #91 Minutes
4.1	U+2C80..2CEA, 2CF9..2CFF	114	L2/03-208		Constable, Peter (2003-06-13), Proposal to Encode Coptic Letter Eie for use in Textual Apparatus
4.1	U+2C80..2CEA, 2CF9..2CFF	114	L2/03-283	N2611	Everson, Michael (2003-08-24), Proposal to add the Coptic alphabet to the BMP of the UCS
4.1	U+2C80..2CEA, 2CF9..2CFF	114	L2/03-327	N2636	Everson, Michael (2003-10-01), Revised proposal to add the Coptic alphabet to the BMP of the UCS
4.1	U+2C80..2CEA, 2CF9..2CFF	114	L2/04-053		Emmel, Stephen (2004-01-26), Changes to ISO/IEC JTC1/SC2/WG2 N2636 and N2676 recommended by the International Association for Coptic Studies
4.1	U+2C80..2CEA, 2CF9..2CFF	114	L2/04-068		Mansour, Kamal (2004-02-02), Coptic Comments
4.1	U+2C80..2CEA, 2CF9..2CFF	114	L2/04-130	N2744	Everson, Michael; Emmel, Stephen (2004-04-20), Revision of the Coptic block under ballot for the BMP of the UCS
4.1	U+2C80..2CEA, 2CF9..2CFF	114		N2824	Updated charts for Coptic N2744, 2004-06-22
5.2	U+2CEB..2CF1	7	L2/07-085R	N3222R	Everson, Michael; Emmel, Stephen; Marjanen, Antti; Dunderberg, Ismo; Baines, John; Pedro, Susana; Emiliano, António (2007-03-15), Proposal to add additional characters for Coptic and Latin in the UCS
5.2	U+2CEB..2CF1	7	L2/07-118R2		Moore, Lisa (2007-05-23), "111-C17", UTC #111 Minutes
5.2	U+2CEB..2CF1	7	L2/07-268	N3253 (pdf, doc)	Umamaheswaran, V. S. (2007-07-26), "M50.30", Unconfirmed minutes of WG 2 meeting 50, Frankfurt-am-Main, Germany; 2007-04-24/27
6.1	U+2CF2..2CF3	2	L2/10-290	N3873R	Everson, Michael; Emmel, Stephen; Richter, Siegfried G.; Pedro, Susana; Emiliano, António (2010-08-05), Proposal to add additional characters for Greek, Latin, and Coptic
6.1	U+2CF2..2CF3	2	L2/10-221		Moore, Lisa (2010-08-23), "C.25", UTC #124 / L2 #221 Minutes
6.1	U+2CF2..2CF3	2	L2/10-348	N3912	Everson, Michael; Emmel, Stephen; Richter, Siegfried G.; Pedro, Susana; Emiliano, António (2010-09-21), Revised proposal to add additional characters for Greek, Latin, and Coptic to the UCS
6.1	U+2CF2..2CF3	2		N3903 (pdf, doc)	"M57.02e", Unconfirmed minutes of WG2 meeting 57, 2011-03-31
