= IX monogram =

Christian monogram

IX monogram

The IX monogram or XI monogram is a type of early Christian monogram, namely Christogram, looking like the Cyrillic letter Ж or the spokes of a wheel, sometimes within a circle.

The IX monogram is formed by the combination of the letter "I" or Iota for Iesous (Ιησους, Jesus in Greek) and "X" or Chi for Christos (Χριστος, Christ in Greek). The spokes can also be standalone, without the circle. These monograms can often be found as ancient burial inscriptions.

== Gallery ==
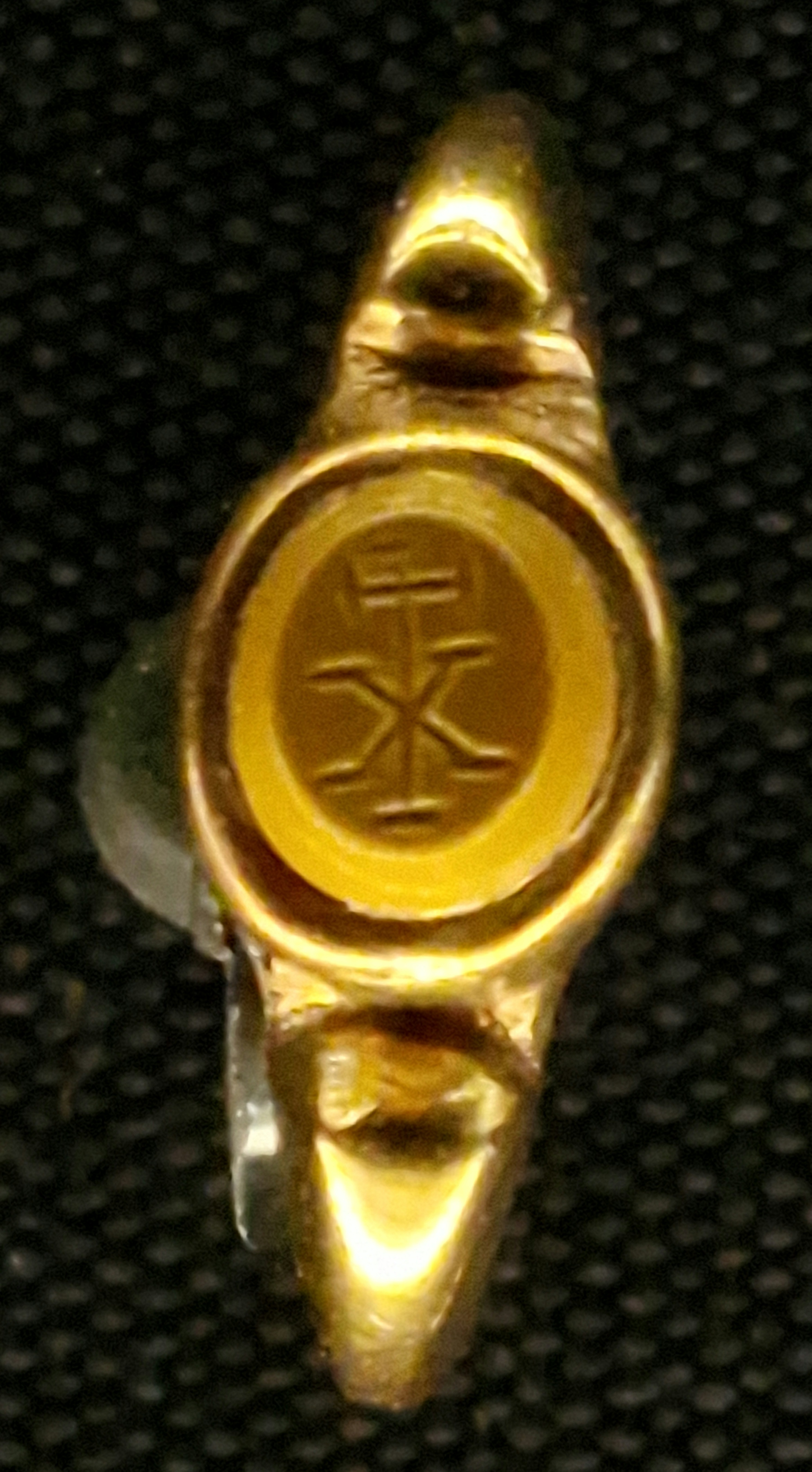
Intaglio with Chi and Iota, 190-300 AD, Swiss National Museum.

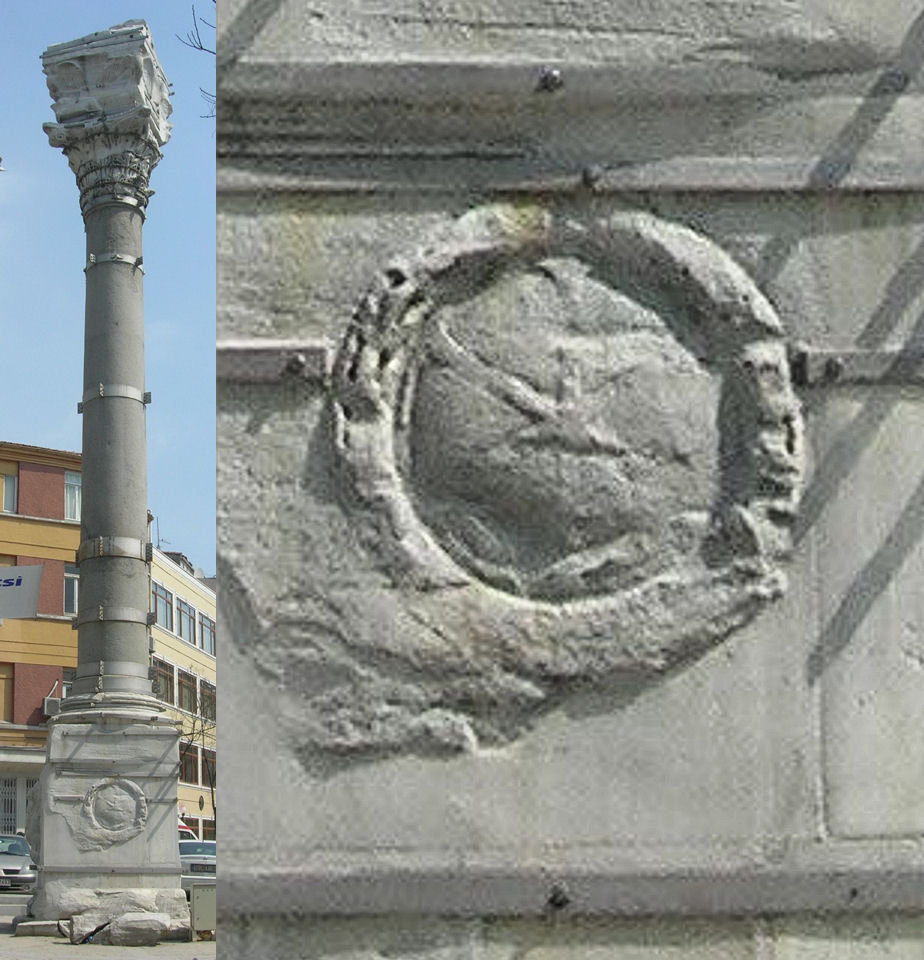
The 5th century Byzantine Column of Marcian displays the XI monogram inside a wreath.

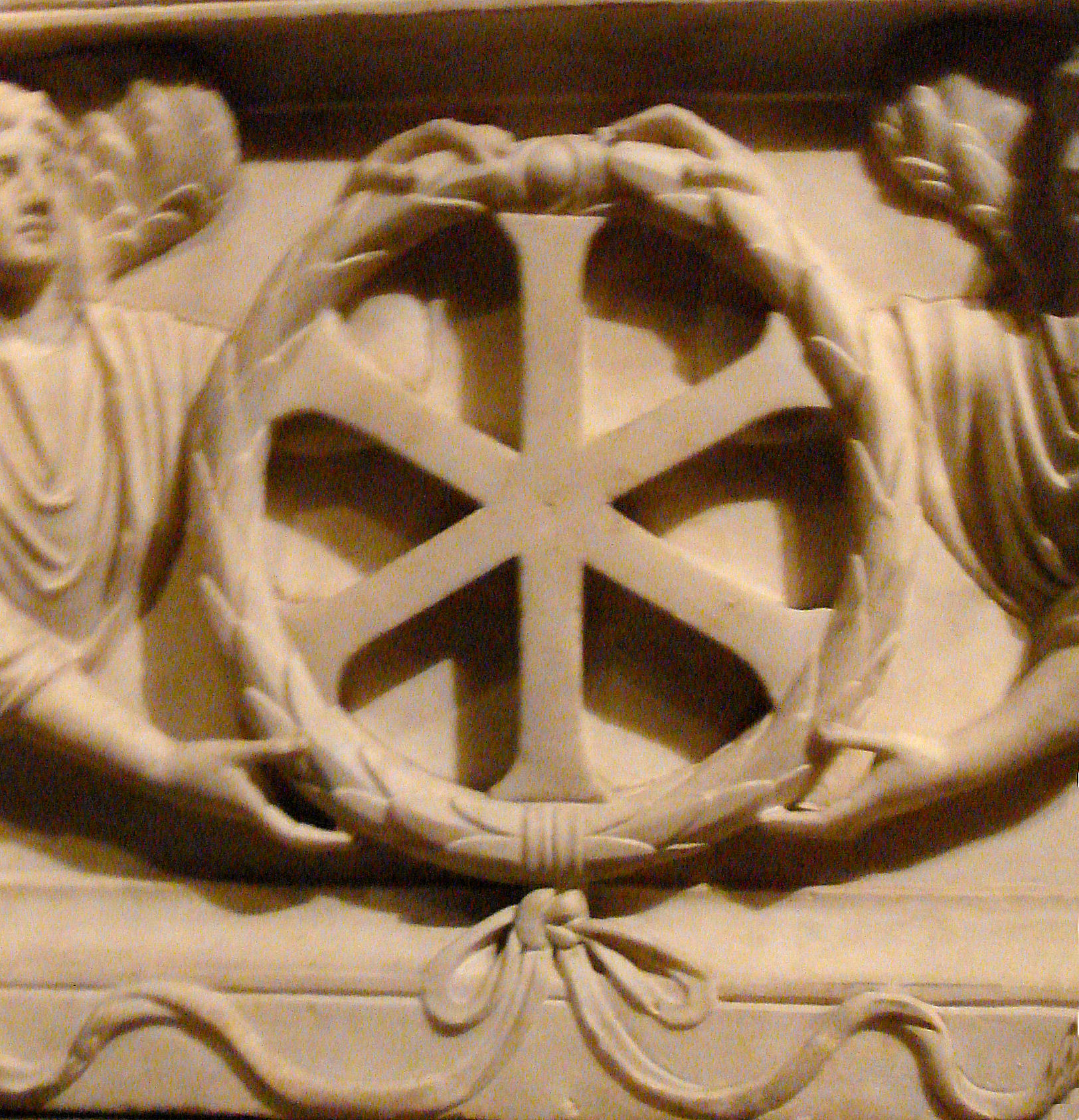
Detail of IX monogram on Constantinople sarcophagus, end of 3rd, early 4th century.

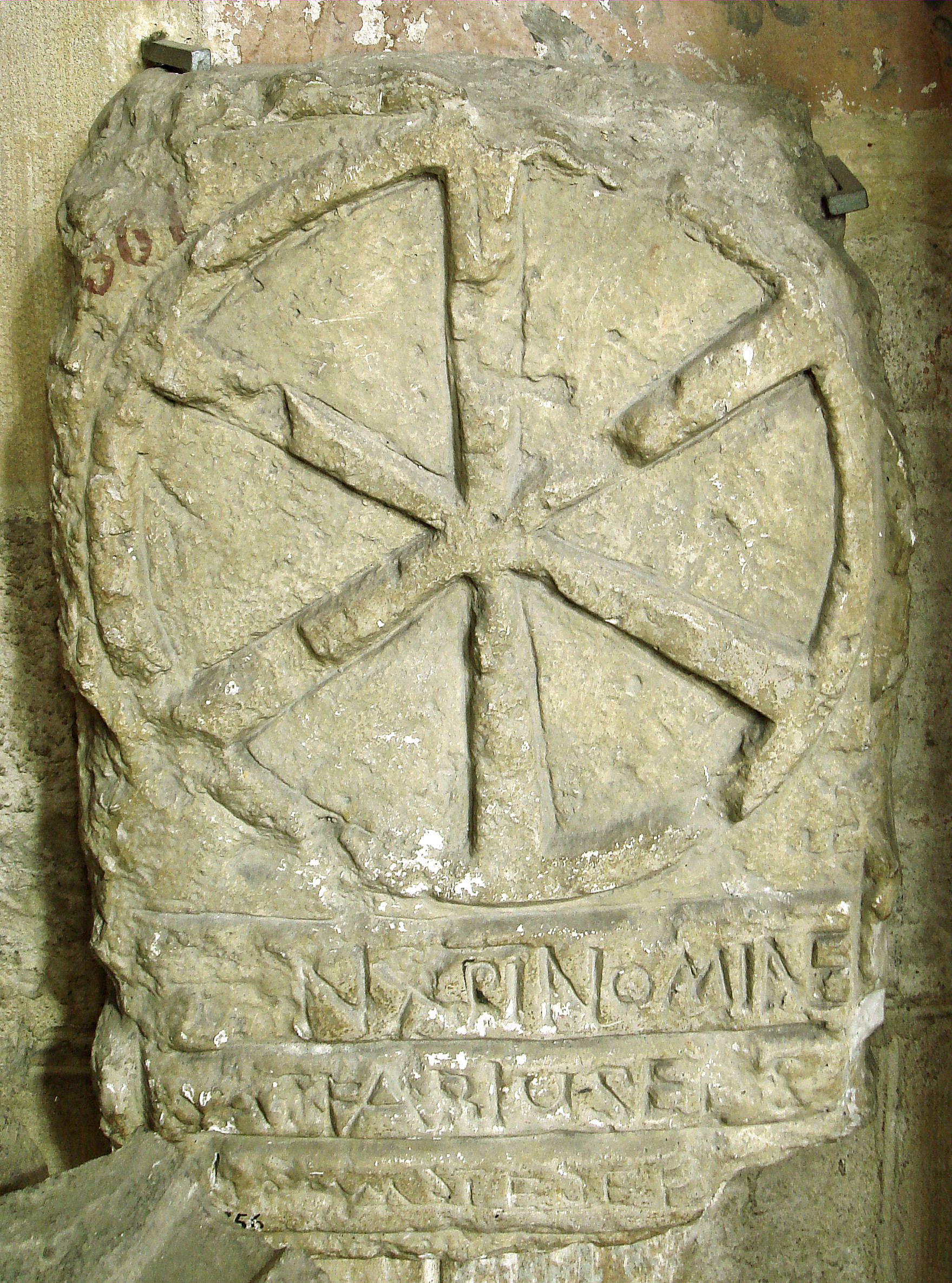
Cover of Merovingian sarcophagus, Musée de Saint-Germain-en-Laye.

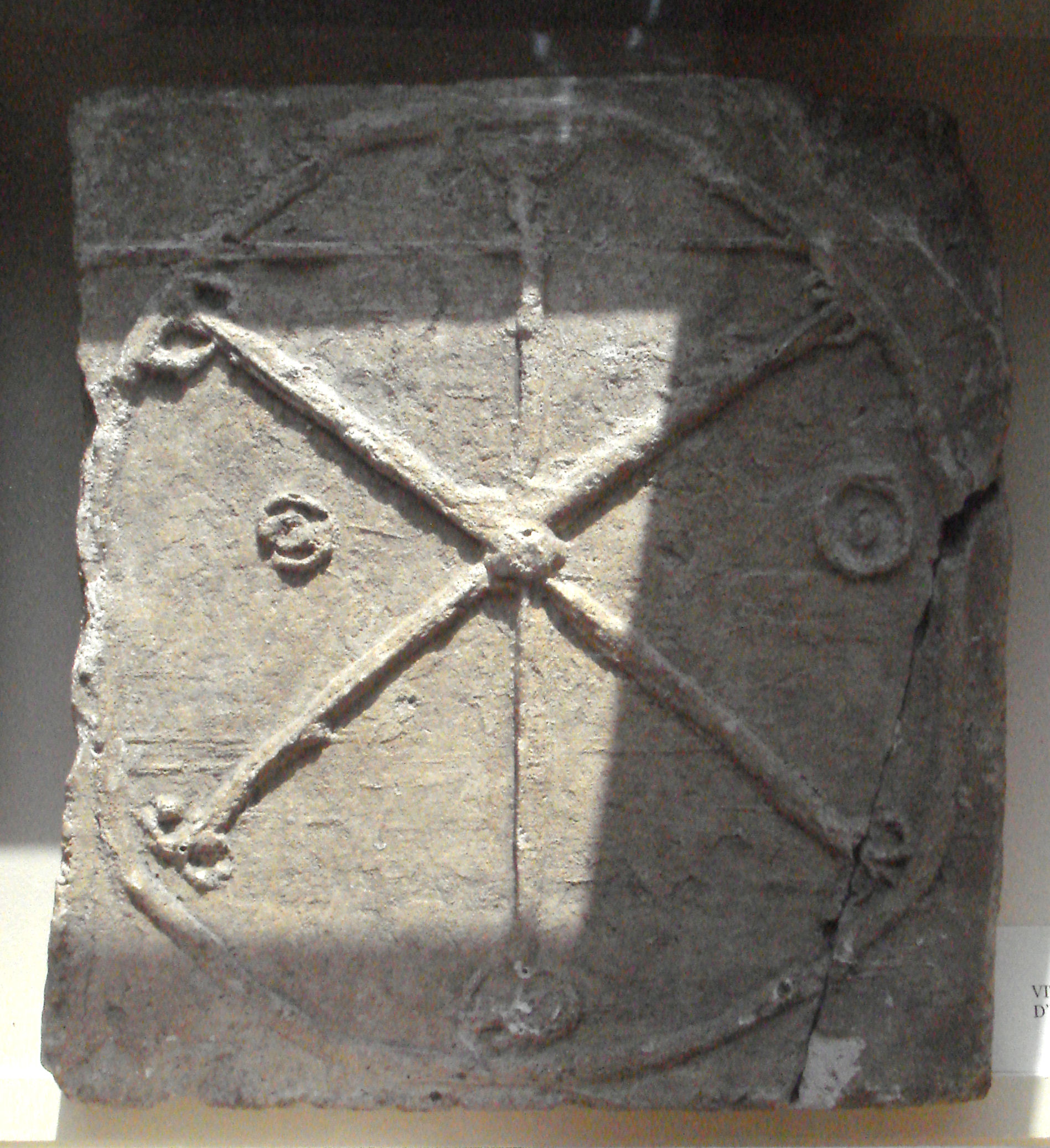
Merovingian sarcophagus symbol, 6-7th century, Paris. Musée Carnavalet

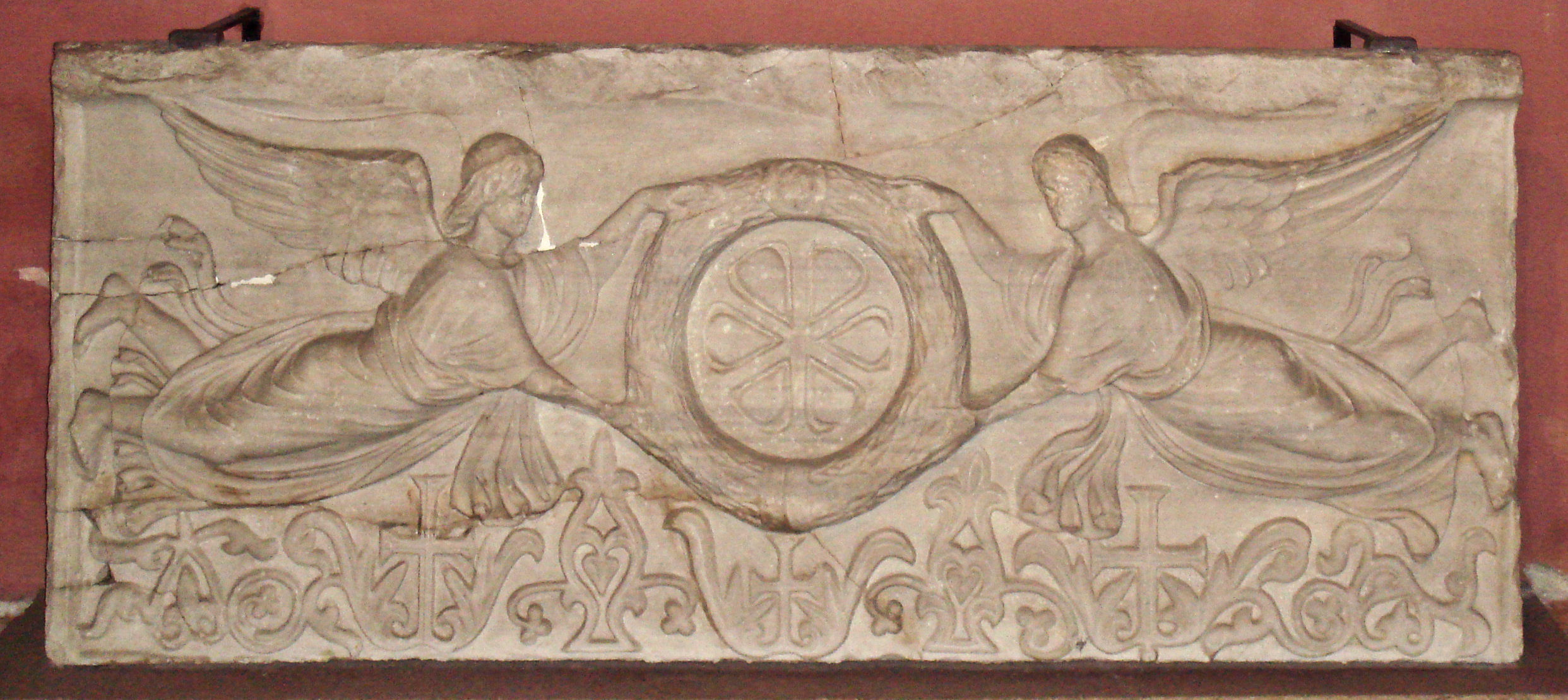
Slab sarcophagus, Beyazit, Constantinople, 5th century.

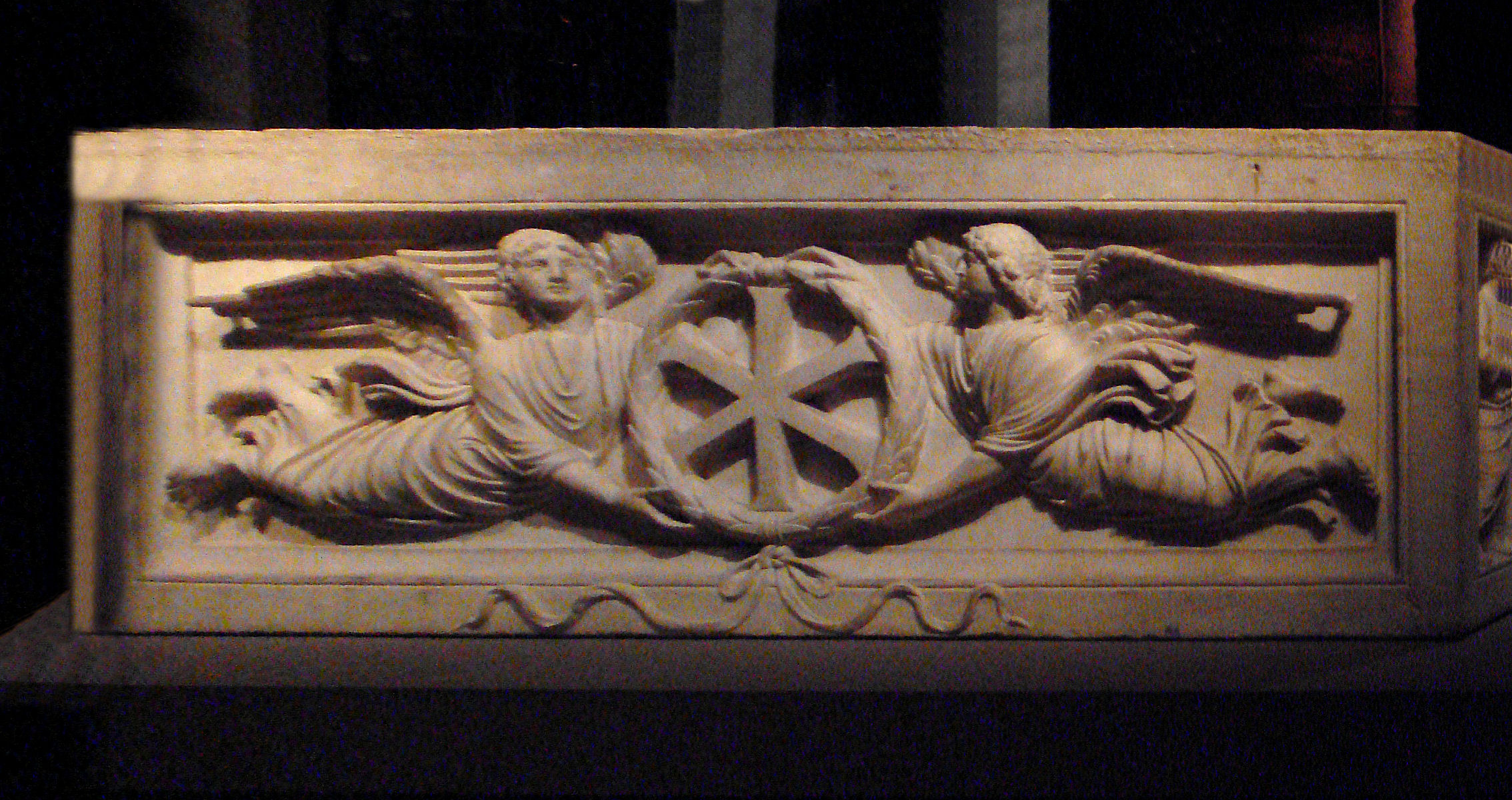
Constantinople Christian sarcophagus with XI monogram, circa 400.

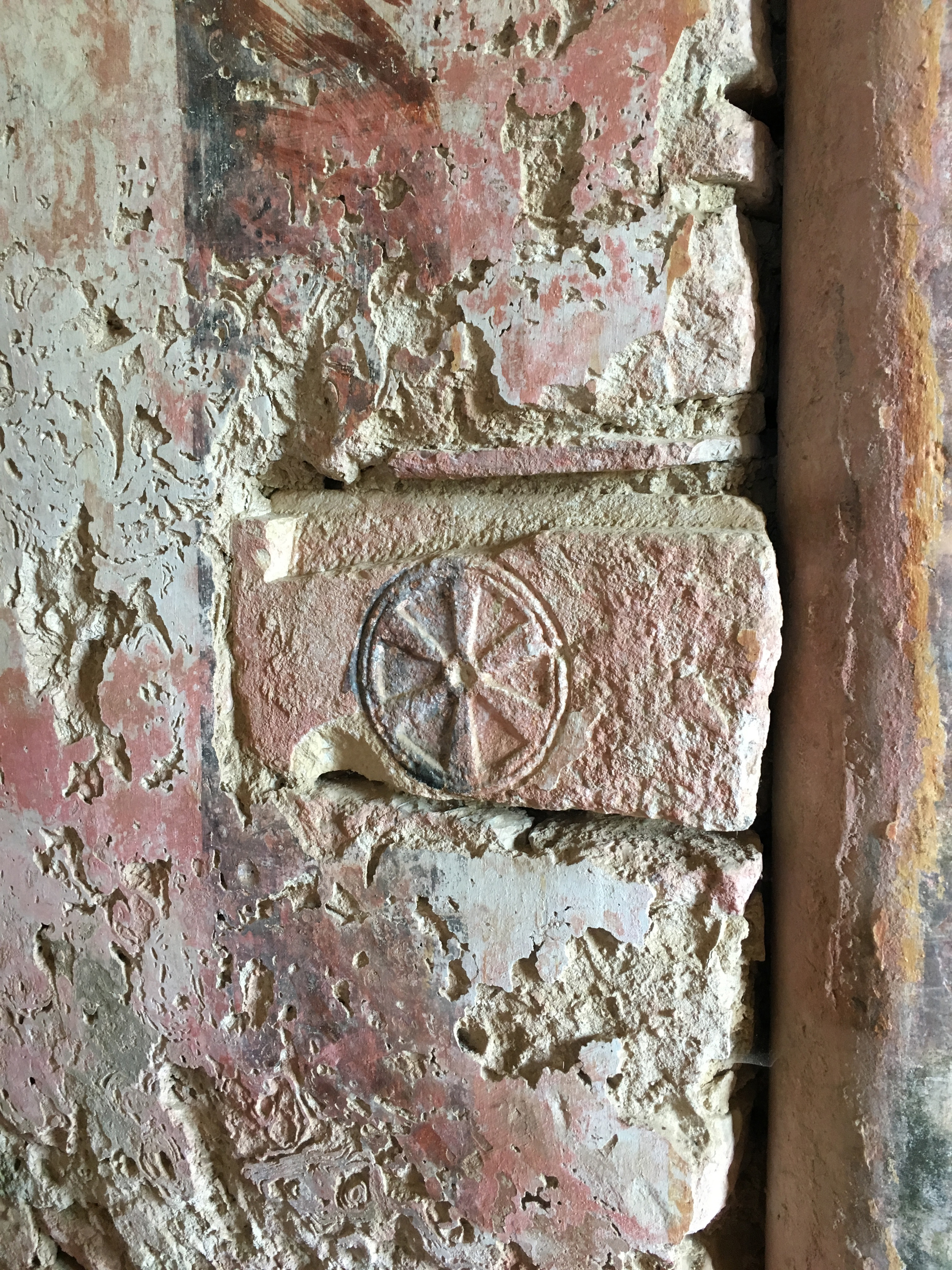
Detail of the early Christian IX monogram in the chapel of La Gayolle (La Celle, Var).

== See also ==
- Ichthys
- Chi Rho
- Christogram
