= General Order No. 11 =

General Order No. 11 may refer to:

- General Order No. 11 (1862), General Ulysses S. Grant's order during the American Civil War that all Jews in his district be expelled.
- General Order No. 11 (1863), Brigadier General Ewing's order that civilians living in several counties of Missouri be expelled and their lands burned.
