= Heterosubtypic immunity =

Cross-immunity for viral substrains

Heterosubtypic immunity (HSI) is "cross-protection to infection with an influenza A virus serotype other than the one used for primary infection." In layman's terms, an "infection with 'seasonal' influenza A viruses could induce immunity against unrelated sub-strains."
