= Xi (business) =

Chinese investment group

Xi (Chinese: 系) is a form of business organization in China where a group of companies are controlled by a private equity fund, forming an investment group.

== Definition ==
The term can be translated as business group or a conglomerate. However, there is a connotation in the term of bending the rules since the companies in the group while tracing to an owner are not affiliated as a neatly organized entity. In a dissertation on the subject a Xiamen University student described the arrangement as follows:

"Very often strings of dysfunctional subsidiaries or intricately affiliated companies in the form “business groups” perform no substantial business activities other than acting merely as financial vehicles for one another. Spin-offs, shell-structures, holding companies are created at rapid rate..."

Comparison can be made to another, more formal kind of network based group structure in corporate China, the qiyejituan (simplified Chinese: 企业集团; traditional Chinese: 企業集團; pinyin: Qǐ yè jí tuán) in which the group of companies is registered as affiliated firms of a parent firm.
