= Xi (surname) =

Xi or Hsi (Mandarin: [ɕi]) is the romanization of several different Chinese family names, including:

- 奚 (Xī; see Chinese Wikipedia article)
- 西 (Xī; see Chinese Wikipedia article)
- 席 (Xí; see Chinese Wikipedia article)
- 習/习 (Xí; see Chinese Wikipedia article) This is the most common surname romanized "Xi", making up approximately 0.01% of the population of Mainland China.
- 隰 (Xí)
- 郤 (Xì; see Chinese Wikipedia article)
- 郗 (Xī; see Chinese Wikipedia article)

== People ==
=== 奚 ===
It is the 45th name in the Hundred Family Surnames poem written during the Song dynasty, around 1000 years ago.

- Ming Xi (奚梦瑶; born 1990), Chinese fashion model
- Xi Aihua (奚爱华; born 1982), Chinese rower
- Xi Xiaoming (奚晓明; born 1954), Chinese judge

=== 席 ===
It is the 133rd name in the Hundred Family Surnames poem. During the Chu–Han Contention, many people surnamed Ji (籍) changed their surname to Xi (席) because of naming taboo of Xiang Yu, the Hegemon-King of Western Chu, whose given name was Ji (籍).

- Xi Murong (席慕容; born 1943), Chinese writer
- Xi Shengmo (席勝魔; 1836–1896), Chinese religious leader
- Xi Zezong (席泽宗; 1927–2008), Chinese astronomer

=== 習/习 ===
It is 332nd in the Hundred Family Surnames poem. However it is not among the 400 most common surnames, occupying 0.01% of the Han population.

- Xi Zuochi (习凿齿; 316–384), Chinese historian
- Xi Zhongxun (习仲勋; 1913–2002), Chinese politician, father of Xi Jinping
- Xi Jinping (习近平; born 1953), Chinese politician, CCP general secretary and 6th paramount leader of China
- Xi Mingze (习明泽; born 1992), only child and daughter of Xi Jinping

=== 郗 ===
It is 234th in the Hundred Family Surnames poem.

- Xiaoxing Xi (郗小星; born 1958), American physicist

=== Pen name ===
- Xi Xi (西西), pseudonym of Zhang Yan (張彥; 1937–2022), Chinese author and poet

== See also ==
- Xi (disambiguation)
- Ximen, a surname
