= Ram Chandra (Lalaji) =

Indian spiritual leader

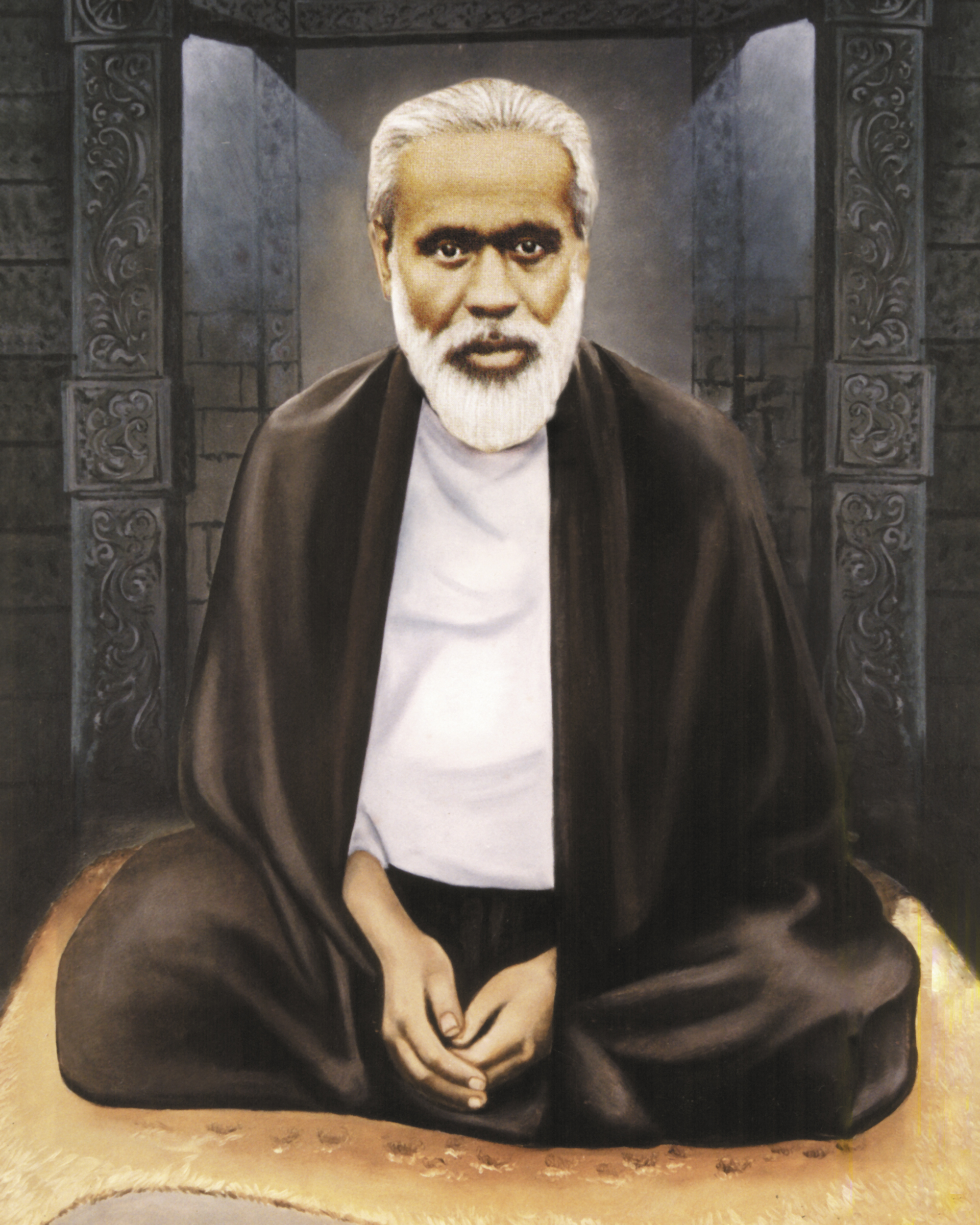

Personal life
- Born: Ram Chandra; 2 February 1873 Fatehgarh, Uttar Pradesh, India
- Died: 14 August 1931
- Notable work(s): “Truth Eternal”, "The path of Sufis & Saints (Tatva-Prabodhni)","Kamal-e-Insani"

Religious life
- Institute: Ramashram Satsang, Mathura, Shri Ram Chandra Mission, Akhil Bhartiya Santmat Satsang,Ramashram Satsang Ghaziabad
- Philosophy: Sahaj Marg, Heartfulness, Sant Mat

Senior posting
- Disciples: Chaturbhuj Sahay, Ram Chandra (Babuji), Bhavani Shankar of Orai, Harnarayan-saxena.com, Dr.Shri Krishna Lal Bhatnagar, Secundrabad, Dr.Shyam Lal Saxena, Ghaziabad

Ram Chandra (Lalaji) (2 February 1873 – 14 August 1931) was a spiritual leader from Fatehgarh, Uttar Pradesh, India. He was popularly known as "Lalaji" among his followers. He is said to have re-discovered the ancient Indian system of transmission called "Pranahuti" (offering of Prana) which is often referred to as “Pranasya Pranah” (Life of Life) in the practice of meditation. After he died his disciples started the organizations Shri Ram Chandra Mission and Ramashram Satsang.

== Early life, education and family ==
He was born on February 2, 1873, at Fatehgarh, Uttar Pradesh in North India on the day of "Basant Panchmi" (as per Hindu calendar). His father, Harbaksh Rai, was a tax superintendent at Farrukhabad. His mother, Durga Devi, was a religious lady, who influenced Ram Chandra towards spirituality in his childhood. His father belonged to a family of Jagirdars (landlords), but they lost most of their wealth in the post mutiny disturbances at that time, and in a legal battle. Later Ram Chandra worked with one of his father's associates in the collector's office at Fatehgarh for his livelihood. He was married and led a family life.

== Spiritual life ==
His interest in spirituality grew during his school days. He rediscovered the ancient technique of yogic transmission which is also called “Pranahuti” (Upanishadic “Pranasya Pranah”). Pranahuti involves transmitting divine energy from the original source into the heart of the practitioner to expedite his spiritual progress. When he began imparting spiritual training some school teachers experienced positive changes in their personalities. The word spread and more people were attracted to Ram Chandra. He started formal group meditation (Satsang) in 1914. He continued the work until his death on 14 August 1931.

== Following ==
His disciples started many spiritual organizations like: “SRCM (Shri Ram Chandra Mission)” started by his disciple with the same name as his – “Ram Chandra” of Shahjahanpur,“Ramashram Satsang” by “Chaturbhuj Sahay”, and “Ram Samadhi Ashram” by “Thakur Ram Singh Bhati”.

== Literary work ==
- Complete Works of Ram Chandra, Vol. 2, Vol. 3 and Vol. 4.

== 150th anniversary ==
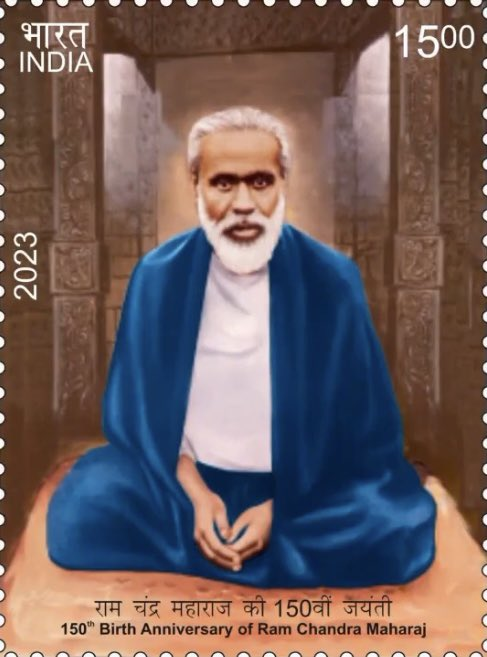
Postal Stamp released on LalaJi Maharaj in 2023

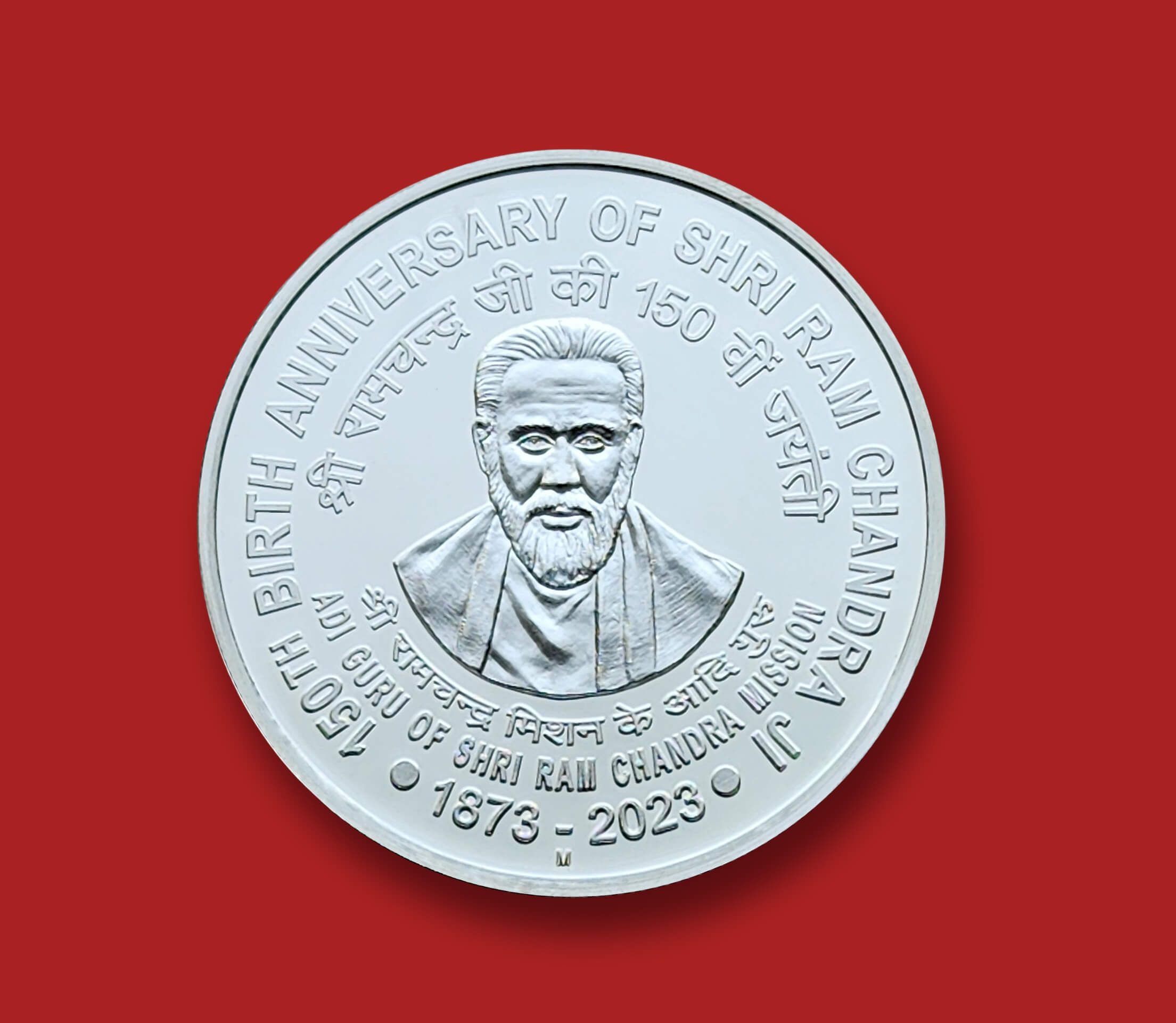
Commemorative coin of Rs 150 on150th Anniversary of Shri Ram Chandraji Maharaj of Fatehgarh

The Government of India released the commemorative coin of Rs 150 and postage stamp on 2 February 2023 at Kanha Shanti Vanam, Hyderabad. Ministry of Finance issued a gazette notification for the release of coin on 25 October 2022. Hon’ble Minister of State of Communications, Shri Devusingh Jesinghbhai Chuhan joined by Chief Post Master General, Telangana Circle, Shri K. Prakash released the commemorative postal stamp on 2 February 2023 in the presence of Daaji, the current global guide of Heartfulness.

The Government of India through a gazette notification by the Ministry of Finance on 25 October 2022, released the commemorative coin of Rs 150 along with the postage stamp on 2 February 2023 at Kanha Shanti Vanam, Hyderabad.

A 10 days long Music & Meditation festival was celebrated from 25 January till 3 February 2023 at Kanha Shanti Vanam, the world headquarters of Heartfulness. It was marked by the presence of several internationally renowned artists and attended by hundreds of thousands of seekers and visitors. An Inner Peace Museum was also inaugurated, showcasing artworks, paintings, sculptures, and other installations that depict the life and teachings of Lalaji Maharaj in his own handwriting.
