= Rajagopalachari (given name) =

Given name list

- Gender: Male

Origin
- Region of origin: Tamil Nadu, Karnataka

Rajagopalachari is a given name used amongst the Iyengar community of Tamil Nadu.

Notable people with the name include:

- C. Rajagopalachari (1878–1972), Indian statesman, writer, lawyer, and independence activist.
- Parthasarathi Rajagopalachari (1927–2014), Indian yoga master.
- Perungavur Rajagopalachari (1862–1927), Indian civil servant and administrator.
