= Chaturbhuj Sahay =

Indian religious figure (1883–1957)

Dr Chaturbhuj Sahay डॉ चतुर्भुज सहाय
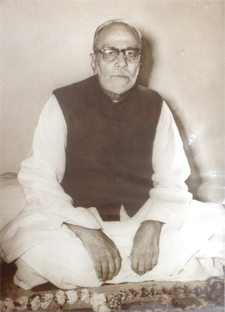
- Samarth Guru Dr Chaturbhuj Sahay

Personal life
- Born: 3 November 1883^{**} Etah, Uttar Pradesh, India
- Died: 24 September 1957 Mathura, Uttar Pradesh, India
- Spouse: Indira Devi
- Honors: Samarth Guru

Religious life
- Religion: Hinduism
- Founder of: Ramashram Satsang, Mathura
- Philosophy: Karma, Upasana, Bhakti, Gyaan with emphasis on Upasana

Religious career
- Teacher: Mahatma Ramchandra Ji a.k.a. Ram Chandra (Lalaji)
- Disciples: Bihari ji, Pandit Mihilal, Rajey bhaiya, and others
- ^** Dr Chaturbhuj Sahay's birthday is observed on 3 November as Jyoti Parva (Festival of Divine Light) in New Delhi.

Quotation

God (Ishwar) is one and the path to meet God also is one, and that path is concentration i.e. concentration of mind.

Dr Chaturbhuj Sahay (Hindi: चतुर्भुज सहाय ) (3 November 1883 – 24 September 1957), also known as Guru Maharaj, was an Indian mystic and capable master.

Due to the spiritual atmosphere at home, he started detaching from the world. From a very young age, he used to meet Saints and Yogiraj or learned ascetics (Sanyasi), and was influenced by several religious traditions.

He started spiritual organization Ramashram Satsang, Mathura in the name of his Guru Ram Chandra (Lalaji), where it is believed that the soul power is transferred. This organization has now acquired good influence in India as well as other countries.

The system of meditation he preached is a synthesis between Karma (action), Upasana (devotion) and Gyaan (knowledge), 'Love' is mingled in all its methods, central focus is on the Spiritual Master, who by Soul-Power uplifts the aspirants and makes them experience the higher stages of spirituality.

== Early life ==
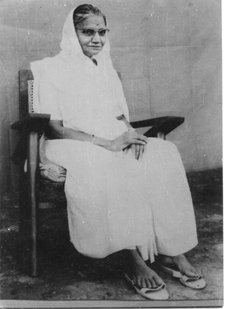
Indira Devi (1901–1985), wife and spiritual counterpart of Dr Chaturbhuj Sahay

Sahay was born to father Ramprasad on 3 November 1883 ( samvat 1940, Kartik (month), Shukla Paksha, Chaturthi ), in the village of Chamkari, in the Etah Province, of "North-Western Provinces" (of Agra) into a well to do, pious, and orthodox Kulshreshtha Kayastha family. His father was an ascetic and an accomplished astrologer, he wrote some books on astrology that are available today as manuscript.

He was taught Urdu and Persian language by a Mawlawi and Devanagari by a Pandit. Later he studied medicine and practiced in the medical field.

He was married to Indira Devi and had two daughters and three sons. His eldest son Dr Brijendra Kumar retired as Medical Superintendent of a Government Hospital in Mathura, his second son Hemendra Kumar helped him in his spiritual life, and the third and the youngest son Dr Narendra Kumar retired as a Professor from University of Rajasthan. His three sons treated their father as their Guru and whenever time permitted traveled India wide to spread their father's message. They lovingly called their father Chaachaa ji. His two daughters Shraddha and Sudha also were married into spiritually inclined families.

== Religious practices and teachers ==
At the age of eighteen he had to go to his maternal grandparents place at Fatehgarh, and there he remained for many years. The cleanser of sinners, the pure dark Bhagirathi Ganges flowed a furlong away from the house. For his recreation, at times in the evenings, he would go there. Ascetics (Sadhus) and Mahatmas were also there at the shores of Ganges. Out of them most were materialistic and hypocrites, but even then, at times, good Saints and Yogi or learned ascetics (practitioners of Sannyasa) too came there. He liked to serve such saints, and to keep their company (Satsang) and to converse with them. He learned from them many types of Pranayama, many methods of Rajyoga and Hatha yoga, and to some extent he also practiced them, but he could not be satisfied by these people. Their methods were not favorable for him. Therefore, he could neither connect with any of them, nor make anyone his Guru.

== Arya Samaj ==
Many of his friends followed Arya Samaj. In their association the views of Arya Samaj impressed him, and he too became a follower of Arya Samaj. Its members were straight forward, honest, and simple, and followed Karmakand (Karmakanda (Sanskrit) is that part of the Śruti or Vedas writings which relates to ceremonial acts and sacrificial rites). The inclination to work was there also within him; therefore, he too joined Arya Samaj. He worked for many years in Fatehgarh and Agra within Arya Samaj.

However, he resigned and separated from them after some time due to internal fights.

== Guru ==
Sahay met his Guru Ram Chandra (Lalaji) around the year 1910 or 1911. At that time, wife of Ramchandra was unwell. In that connection, Sahay first met with him in the capacity of a medical practitioner. Sahay continued to meet him for two years regularly. Lalaji had put a garb of service and householder around him and his real form was not visible. Lalaji's neighbors, relatives, and friends those who sat near him day and night, all of them only knew him as a good person and that is all.

Sahay was one of the senior-most disciple of Lalaji. His life was devoted towards spiritual upliftment of mankind. He has a number of spiritual publications for the benefit of the common people. Acting on the wishes of Lalaji, he translated the core principles of Pujya Lalaji’s mission in hindi which was originally in Urdu so that it could be accessible to common people.

== Principles ==
1. God is energy, has no name or form, whatever name one keeps is alright.
2. To seek God one need not renounce household and wander in the forest; one can live at home and still reach God.
3. You have not seen God, hence first meet that person who has seen God. Only that person can enable you to see God.
4. Infuse inner happiness into your life, it is a divine virtue.
5. Peace is in the knowledge, you will not get it from outside. Knowledge is within you. For this you will have to make internal efforts.
6. Devote more time to worldly activities, give some time to these efforts. But for this much time forget the world.
7. Two activities are very important for spiritual seeker – first, earn an honest living and second, keep busy with work.
8. Knowledge is infinite. If one Guru could not complete it then seek the guidance of another Guru. However, after finding a fully self-realized Guru one should not seek another Guru.
9. Do all worldly work but with a spirit of service, not as owner.
10. Live in this world as a guest. Think of everything as belonging to someone else. Leave "me and mine," and learn the lesson of "you and yours".

== See also ==
- Mahatma Ramchandra
- Surat Shabd Yoga
