= Omega =

Last letter of the Greek alphabet

Omega (US: /oʊˈmeɪɡə, -ˈmɛɡə/, UK: /ˈoʊmɪɡə, oʊˈmiːɡə/;uppercase Ω, lowercase ω) is the twenty-fourth and last letter of the Greek alphabet. In the Greek numeric system/isopsephy, it has a value of 800. The name of the letter was originally ὦ (ō̂ [ɔ̂ː]), but it was later changed to ὦ μέγα (ō̂ méga 'big o') to distinguish it from omicron ⟨ο⟩, whose name means 'small o', as both letters had come to be pronounced [o]. In modern Greek, its name has fused into ωμέγα (oméga).

In phonetic terms, the Ancient Greek Ω represented a long open-mid back rounded vowel [ɔː], in contrast to omicron, which represented the close-mid back rounded vowel [o], and the digraph ⟨ου⟩, which represented the long close back rounded vowel [uː]. In modern Greek, both omega and omicron represent the mid back rounded vowel [o̞]. The letter omega is transliterated into a Latin-script alphabet as ō or o.

As the final letter in the Greek alphabet, omega is often used to denote the last, the end, or the ultimate limit of a set, in contrast to alpha, the first letter of the Greek alphabet, as in the phrase Alpha and Omega.

== History ==
The letter Ω was not part of the early Greek alphabets in the 8th century BC. It was introduced in the late 7th century BC in the Ionian cities of Asia Minor to denote a long open-mid back rounded vowel [ɔː]. It is a variant of omicron (Ο), broken up at the side, with the edges subsequently turned outward. The Dorian city of Knidos as well as a few Aegean islands, namely Paros, Thasos and Melos, chose the exact opposite innovation, using a broken-up circle for the short and a closed circle for the long /o/.

The name Ωμέγα is Byzantine; in Classical Greek, the letter was called ō (ὦ) (pronounced /ɔ̂ː/), whereas the omicron was called ou (οὖ) (pronounced /ôː/). The modern lowercase shape goes back to the uncial form, a form that developed during the 3rd century BC in ancient handwriting on papyrus, from a flattened-out form of the letter that had its edges curved even further upward.

In addition to the Greek alphabet, Omega was also adopted into the early Cyrillic alphabet (see Cyrillic omega (Ѡ, ѡ)). A Raetic variant is conjectured to be at the origin or parallel evolution of the Elder Futhark ᛟ.

Omega was also adopted into the Latin alphabet, as the Latin omega, as a letter of the 1982 revision to the African reference alphabet, and is in sparse use.

== Uses ==
=== Uppercase ===
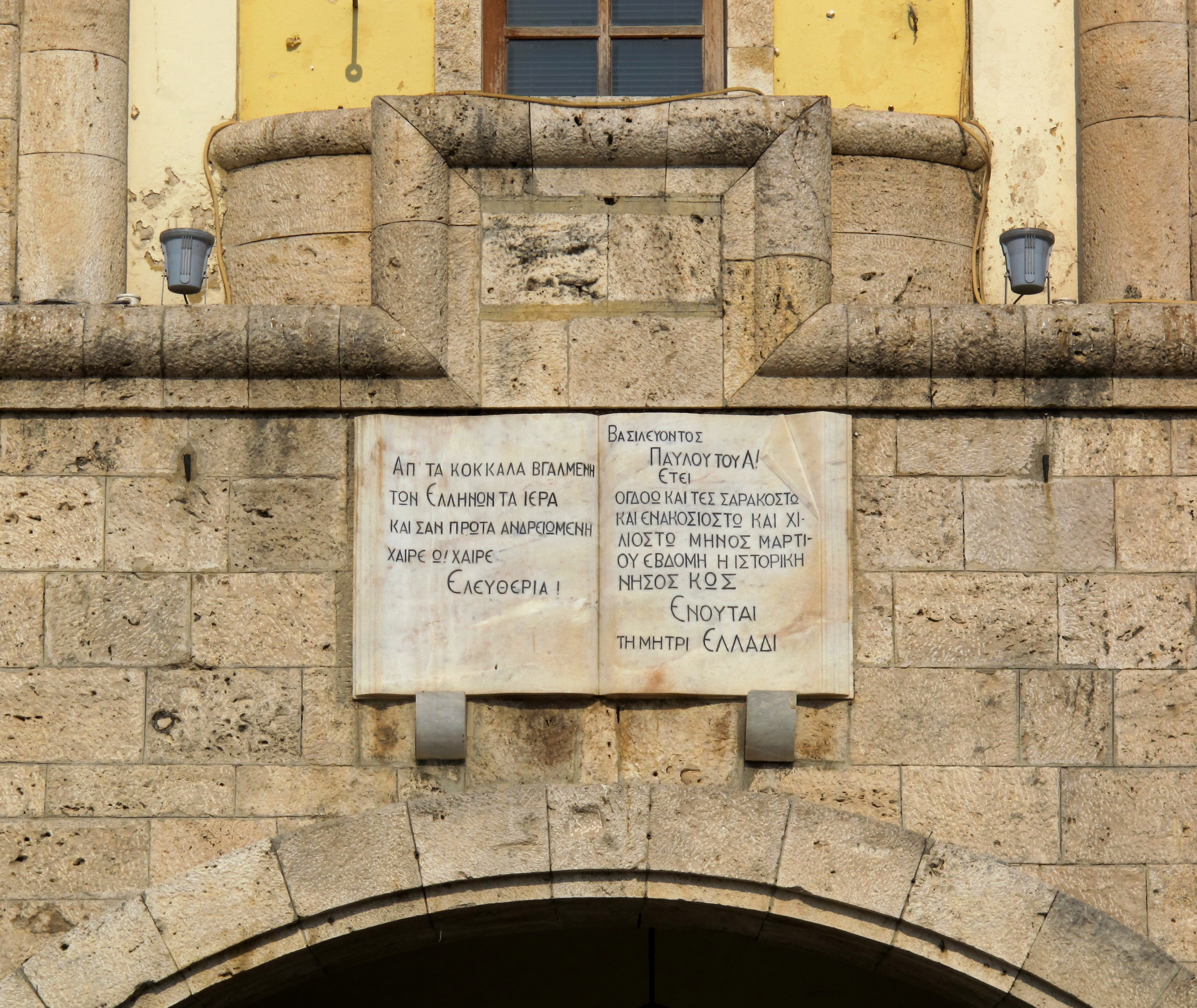
Plaque on the Greek island of Kos with "underlined O" form of omega

The uppercase letter Ω is used as a symbol:

- In chemistry:
  - For oxygen-18, a natural, stable isotope of oxygen.
  - For omega loop, a protein structural motif consisting of a loop of six or more amino acid residues in any sequence, a structure named for its resemblance to the Greek letter.
- In physics:
  - For ohm – SI unit of electrical resistance. Unicode has a separate code point U+2126 Ω OHM SIGN (HTML entity &ohm;), but it is included only for backward compatibility, and the canonically equivalent code point U+03A9 Ω GREEK CAPITAL LETTER OMEGA (&Omega;) is preferred. Also formerly also used upside down (U+2127 ℧ INVERTED OHM SIGN) to represent mho, the old name for the inverse of an ohm (now siemens with symbol S), the SI unit of electrical conductance.
  - In statistical mechanics, Ω refers to the multiplicity (number of microstates) in a system.
  - The solid angle or the rate of precession in a gyroscope.
  - In particle physics to represent the Omega baryons.
  - In astronomy (cosmology), Ω refers to the average density of the universe, also called the density parameter.
  - In astronomy (orbital mechanics), Ω refers to the longitude of the ascending node of an orbit.
- In mathematics and computer science:
  - In complex analysis, the Omega constant, a solution of Lambert's W function.
  - In differential geometry, the space of differential forms on a manifold (of a certain degree, usually with a superscript).
  - A variable for a 2-dimensional region in calculus, usually corresponding to the domain of a double integral.
  - In topos theory, the (codomain of the) subobject classifier of an elementary topos.
  - In combinatory logic, the looping combinator, (S I I (S I I)).
  - In group theory, the omega and agemo subgroups of a p-group, Ω(G) and ℧(G).
  - In group theory, Cayley's Ω process as a partial differential operator.
  - In statistics, it is used as the symbol for the sample space, or total set of possible outcomes.
  - In triangle geometry, Brocard points.
  - In number theory, Ω(n) is the number of prime divisors of n (counting multiplicity).
  - In notation related to Big O notation to describe the asymptotic behavior of functions.
  - Chaitin's constant.
  - In set theory, the first uncountable ordinal number, ω_{1} or Ω.
  - The absolute infinite proposed by Georg Cantor.
- As part of a logo or trademark:
  - The logo of Omega Watches SA.
  - Part of the original Pioneer logo.
  - Part of the Badge of the Supreme Court of the United Kingdom.
  - Part of the mission patch for STS-135, as it was the last mission of the Space Shuttle program.
  - The logo of the God of War video game series based on Greek mythology. In God of War (2018), it is revealed it stands as the symbol of war in Greece.
  - The logo of E-123 Omega, a Sonic the Hedgehog character.
  - The logo of the Heroes of Olympus series, based on Greek mythology.
  - The logo of the Ultramarines in Warhammer 40,000.
  - The logo of Primal Groudon, the version mascot of Pokémon Omega Ruby.
  - The logo of Darkseid in DC comics.
  - One of the logos of professional wrestler Kenny Omega.
  - The logo for Meow Wolf's Omega Mart in Area15, Las Vegas, Nevada.
  - The logo of Lalaji Memorial Omega International School.

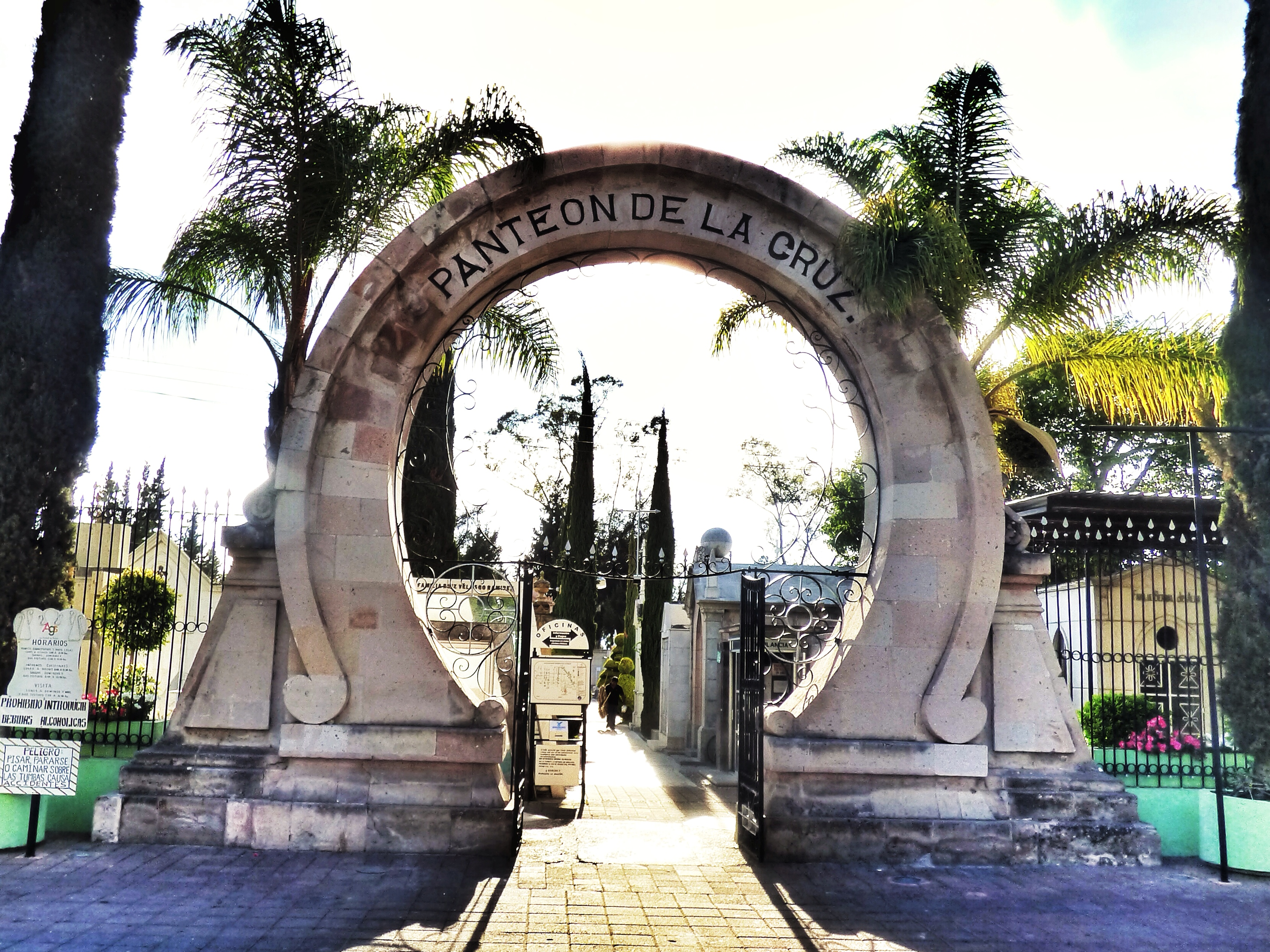
Omega-shaped entrance to the Panteón de la Cruz in Aguascalientes, representing the end of life

- Other:
  - In eschatology, the symbol for the end of everything.
  - In molecular biology, the symbol is used as shorthand to signify a genetic construct introduced by a two-point crossover.
  - Omega Particle in the Star Trek universe.
  - The final form of NetNavi bosses in some of the Mega Man Battle Network games.
  - A secret boss in the Final Fantasy series called Omega ( Ω ) Weapon.
  - A character from the series Doctor Who called Omega, believed to be one of the creators of the Time Lords of Gallifrey.
  - The symbol for the highest power level of a PSI attack in the Mother/EarthBound games.
  - A symbol used by U.S. citizens in the 1960s & 1970s to denote resistance to the U.S. war in Viet Nam. Adapted from the SI unit for electrical resistance.
  - It is used along with Alpha in the Alpha and Omega, a Christian symbol.
  - Used as the highest tier of equipment in the flash game, Learn to Fly.
  - Appears in galaxy quest as the Omega 13 device.
  - In the name of the subgenre of erotic fiction, the Omegaverse.

=== Lowercase ===
The minuscule letter ω is used as a symbol:

- Biology, biochemistry and chemistry:
  - In biochemistry, for one of the RNA polymerase subunits
  - In biology, for fitness
  - In chemistry, for denoting the carbon atom furthest from the carboxyl group of a fatty acid
  - In genomics, as a measure of molecular evolution in protein-coding genes (also denoted as d_{N}/d_{S} or K_{a}/K_{s} ratio)
- Physics:
  - Angular velocity or angular frequency
  - Rotation velocity (bold), rotational speed or frequency
  - In computational fluid dynamics, the specific turbulence dissipation rate
  - In meteorology, the change of pressure with respect to time of a parcel of air
  - In circuit analysis and signal processing to represent angular frequency, related to frequency f by ω = 2πf
  - In astronomy, as a ranking of a star's brightness within a constellation
  - In orbital mechanics, as designation of the argument of periapsis of an orbit
  - In particle physics to represent the omega meson
- Computer science:
  - In notation related to Big O notation, the asymptotically dominant nature of functions
  - In relational database theory to represent NULL, a missing or inapplicable value
  - In APL, to represent the right parameter to a function
- Mathematics:
  - The smallest transfinite ordinal number, often identified with the set of natural numbers including 0 (sometimes written $\omega_0$)
  - A primitive root of unity, like the complex cube roots of 1
  - The Wright Omega function
  - A generic differential form
  - In number theory, ω(n) is the number of distinct prime divisors of n
  - In number theory, an arithmetic function
  - In combinatory logic, the self-application combinator, (λ x. x x)
  - In triangle geometry, a Brocard angle
  - Clique number in Graph theory
- Finance:
  - In finance, the elasticity of options
  - In analytical investment management, the tracking error of an investment manager
- Other:
  - Used in place of ん in Japanese typing shorthand.
  - In linguistics, the phonological word
  - In textual criticism, the archetype of a manuscript tradition
  - In sociology, used to refer to the lowest ranking member of a group
  - In economics (specifically like in general equilibrium theory), the endowments of agents
  - In shift_JIS art, used to represent the cat's mouth. (e.g. (´･ω･`) ｼｮﾎﾞｰﾝ)
  - In actuarial sciences, used to represent the maximum life span that characterizes a mortality table

== Unicode ==
- U+0277 ɷ LATIN SMALL LETTER CLOSED OMEGA
- U+03A9 Ω GREEK CAPITAL LETTER OMEGA (&ohm;, &Omega;)
- U+03C9 ω GREEK SMALL LETTER OMEGA (&omega;)
- U+03D6 ϖ GREEK PI SYMBOL (&piv;, &varpi;)
- U+0460 Ѡ CYRILLIC CAPITAL LETTER OMEGA
- U+0461 ѡ CYRILLIC SMALL LETTER OMEGA
- U+047A Ѻ CYRILLIC CAPITAL LETTER ROUND OMEGA
- U+047B ѻ CYRILLIC SMALL LETTER ROUND OMEGA
- U+2375 ⍵ APL FUNCTIONAL SYMBOL OMEGA
- U+2379 ⍹ APL FUNCTIONAL SYMBOL OMEGA UNDERBAR
- U+2CB0 Ⲱ COPTIC CAPITAL LETTER OOU
- U+2CB1 ⲱ COPTIC SMALL LETTER OOU
- U+2CBE Ⲿ COPTIC CAPITAL LETTER OLD COPTIC OOU
- U+2CBF ⲿ COPTIC SMALL LETTER OLD COPTIC OOU
- U+A64C Ꙍ CYRILLIC CAPITAL LETTER BROAD OMEGA
- U+A64D ꙍ CYRILLIC SMALL LETTER BROAD OMEGA
- U+A67B ◌ꙻ COMBINING CYRILLIC LETTER OMEGA
- U+A7B6 Ꞷ LATIN CAPITAL LETTER OMEGA
- U+A7B7 ꞷ LATIN SMALL LETTER OMEGA
- U+A7DD ꟝ LATIN CAPITAL LETTER CLOSED OMEGA
- U+AB65 ꭥ GREEK LETTER SMALL CAPITAL OMEGA
- U+107A4 𐞤 MODIFIER LETTER SMALL CLOSED OMEGA
- U+1D6C0 𝛀 MATHEMATICAL BOLD CAPITAL OMEGA (Note: The mathematical characters are used only in math. Stylized Greek text should be encoded using the normal Greek letters, with markup and formatting to indicate the style of the text.)
- U+1D6DA 𝛚 MATHEMATICAL BOLD SMALL OMEGA
- U+1D6FA 𝛺 MATHEMATICAL ITALIC CAPITAL OMEGA
- U+1D714 𝜔 MATHEMATICAL ITALIC SMALL OMEGA
- U+1D734 𝜴 MATHEMATICAL BOLD ITALIC CAPITAL OMEGA
- U+1D74E 𝝎 MATHEMATICAL BOLD ITALIC SMALL OMEGA
- U+1D76E 𝝮 MATHEMATICAL SANS-SERIF BOLD CAPITAL OMEGA
- U+1D788 𝞈 MATHEMATICAL SANS-SERIF BOLD SMALL OMEGA
- U+1D7A8 𝞨 MATHEMATICAL SANS-SERIF BOLD ITALIC CAPITAL OMEGA
- U+1D7C2 𝟂 MATHEMATICAL SANS-SERIF BOLD ITALIC SMALL OMEGA
- U+1DF53 𝽓 LATIN SMALL LETTER BARRED CLOSED OMEGA
- U+1DF60 𝽠 LATIN SMALL LETTER OMEGA WITH LOOP
- U+1DF74 𝽴 LATIN CAPITAL LETTER CLOSED OMEGA WITH LONG STEM
- U+1DF75 𝽵 LATIN SMALL LETTER CLOSED OMEGA WITH LONG STEM
- U+1DF76 𝽶 LATIN CAPITAL LETTER TURNED CLOSED OMEGA
- U+1DF77 𝽷 LATIN SMALL LETTER TURNED CLOSED OMEGA
- U+1DFF4 𝿴 MODIFIER LETTER SMALL GREEK OMEGA
