= The Heartfulness Way =

2018 book by Kamlesh D. Patel and Joshua Pollock

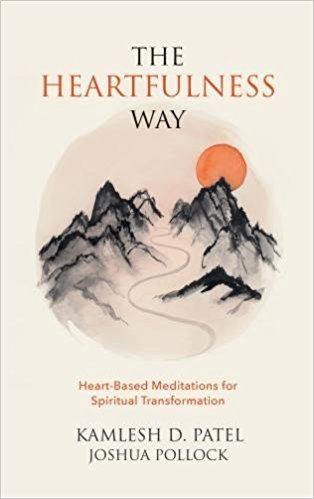
- Author: Kamlesh D. Patel; Joshua Pollock
- Language: English, Hindi, Tamil, Malayalam, Gujarati, Kannada, Marathi
- Subject: Meditation, Rāja yoga, Self-help, Spirituality, Yoga
- Genre: Non-fiction
- Publisher: Westland Publications, Reveal Press (New Harbinger Publications)
- Publication date: January 2018
- Publication place: India, United States
- Media type: Print (hardcover / paperback)
- Pages: 196 pp
- ISBN: 978-1684031344; Other ISBNs: 9789386850560, 9781684031351, 9781684031368
- OCLC: 1038721299
- Website: TheHeartfulnessWay.com

The Heartfulness Way is a book from 2018 about heart-based meditation, written by Kamlesh D. Patel and Joshua Pollock.

== About the book ==
In the book, Kamlesh D. Patel, also known as Daaji, describes the principles of the so-called heartfulness practice and philosophy to Joshua Pollock, a heartfulness practitioner and trainer.

The book is available in English, Hindi, Tamil, Telugu, Malayalam, Gujarati, Kannada and Marathi.

== Publication and release ==
The Heartfulness Way was published by Westland Publications Pvt. Ltd. in India and by Reveal Press (New Harbinger Publications) in the US in 2018, with its text copyrights belonging to Heartfulness Institute, Texas, US. Ram Nath Kovind, the President of India, was present for the book's release on January 4, 2018.

== Reception ==
The book was reviewed in the journal Prabuddha Bharata which called it a step by step guide to the theory and practice of meditation told in an easy to understand manner, and Moin Qazi, writing for Asian Age, gave it a favourable review. It was ranked 1st in Hindustan Times' Nielsen top 10 lists of the Best non-fiction books chart for India.
