= Lalaji Memorial Omega International School =

Location
- Omega School Road, 79, Pallavaram Road, Kovur, Kolapakkam, Chennai, Tamil Nadu 600128.Phone-044 6624 1117; Chennai; India; 13.0032°N 80.1484°E

Information
- Type: Public School
- Motto: सह वीर्यं करवावहै। (Let's Endeavour Together)
- Established: c.2005
- Founder: Shri. Parthasarathi Rajagopalachari
- Chairman: Shri. Rajesh Rathod
- Director: Dr. S. Bhavanishankar
- Principal, CBSE Senior School: Dr. P. Muthiah
- Principal, NIOS: Ms. Priya Susan Satish
- Principal, CBSE Junior School: Ms. Sujatha Kumar
- Head of School - CIS & IB: Ms. Divya Samvit Rajagopalan
- Faculty: Fulltime
- Area: 22 acres (89,000 m^{2})
- Affiliations: Central Board of Secondary Education, Cambridge International Education, National Institute of Open Schooling, IB Diploma Programme
- Website: www.omegaschools.org

Lalaji Memorial Omega International School is a co-educational International day and boarding school situated on in Chennai, India, with more than 7300 students. The foundation stone of the school building was laid in 2005 by its promoter, Sri Parthasarathi Rajagopalachari, one of the respected saints from Tamil Nadu.

== History ==
Lalaji Memorial Omega International School was started in 2005 in Kolapakkam, Chennai.

In the year 2025, The School completed its process of name change to 'Heartfulness International School, Omega Branch,'.

== Education system ==
The school primarily follows the Central Board of Secondary Education (CBSE) system, and also follows other systems such as National Institute of Open Schooling (NIOS), International Baccalaureate (IB), Council of International Schools (CIS), and International General Certificate of Secondary Education (IGCSE) or Cambridge . The school with a capacity of more than 5000 students offers curriculum in National and International Syllabus.

It was rated as one of the top ten schools in India in year 2019, in the International Day cum Boarding school category as per the rankings of Education World.

One of the students of the school, Kaustav Mehta, was named in the merit list of global science video contest. The school also organises co-curricular activities in various streams.

== Initiatives ==
- The school had adopted Government High school, Kolapakkam.
- The school follows natural methods like Organic farming and Solar Power.

== Sports ==
- The school has its cricket ground with state of the art facilities. For Coaching in Cricket the school has tied up with the training centre operated by leading Indian cricketer R.Ashwin.
- In 2020, world famous badminton shuttler PV Sindhu opened her Badminton court and training centre.
- School organises domestic cricket tournaments for different age categories of boys.

== See also ==
- Education in India.
- Shri Ram Chandra Mission (SRCM)
