= Global Spirituality Mahotsav =

Global Spirituality Mahotsav with the theme “Inner Peace to World Peace” was organised by Ministry of Culture, Government of India, in association with Heartfulness Institute and held from 14 to 17 March 2024 at Kanha Shanti Vanam and emerged as a significant platform for encouraging dialogue and understanding across various spiritual traditions prevalent worldwide. The event considered as World's largest spiritual conference and one of a kind four-day event was inaugurated by President of India, Smt Droupadi Murmu and closed with a valedictory address by the Vice-President of India, Jagdeep Dhankar. Representatives of various religious and spiritual organisations connected to Buddhism, Christianity, Islam, Hinduism, and many other institutions participated in the event. Secretary of Commonwealth, Patricia Scotland, graced the occasion with her presence and awarded Kamlesh Patel, President, Shri Ram Chandra Mission with ‘Global Ambassador of Peacebuilding and Faith in the Commonwealth’.

== Objective ==
Global Spirituality Mahotsav, the world's largest spiritual conference, was one of a kind four day event, organised by Ministry of Culture, India in association with Heartfulness Institute at Kanha Shanti Vanam, the world's largest meditation centre, with the theme “Inner Peace to World Peace”. The basic objective of the seminar was to unite all spiritual leaders from different religious and spiritual Institutions of the world. Spiritual heads of various organisations and Institutions participated in the event. The event featured the presence of President of India, Smt Droupadi Murmu, Vice President Shri Mr Jagdeep Dhankar and representation from religious organisations of Buddhism, Christianity, Islam, Hinduism in addition to other religious organisations.

== Speakers ==
Global Spirituality Mahotsav was addressed by Abhijit Halder from International Buddhist Confederation, head of All India Imam Organization, Dr. Imam Umer Ahmed Ilyasi, President of Mahabodhi International Meditation Centre (Ladakh), Venerable Bhikku Sanghasena, head of Anandam Dham Vrindavan, Shri Riteshwar Maharaj, Archbishop of Hyderabad Archbishop Anthony Poola ji, filmmaker Shekhar Kapur, actor Kabir Bedi and many other famous personalities from various walks of life.

== Events ==
Global Spirituality Mahotsav featured various cultural activities, interfaith discussions, and connecting the general public in various age groups from different walks of life to spiritual values in day-to-day life.

The event with the first day attendance of 30,000 members were thrilled with the music performance of Shankar Mahadevan, Kumaresh Rajagopalan and Shashank Subramanyam.

At the end of the event, president of Shri Ram Chandra Mission, Kamlesh D Patel, also known as Daaji, was awarded ‘Global Ambassador of Peacebuilding and Faith in the Commonwealth’ by Secretary of Commonwealth, Rt Hon Patricia Scotland.

== Conclusion ==
Global Spirituality Mahotsav event attended by 300 plus organisations and Institutions concluded with the goal of fostering universal brotherhood among all religious and spiritual organisations and creating spiritual awareness among all sections of public.

== See also ==
- Religion
