= Ramashram Satsang, Mathura =

Ramashram Satsang, Mathura (RSM) is a spiritual organization established by Guru Maharaj (Chaturbhuj Sahay) in the northern Indian town of Mathura.

Guru Chaturbhuj Sahay established RSM in 1930 in Etah in Uttar Pradesh, India, and named it after his guru Shri Ram Chandra. At the behest of his guru, he laid out the secrets of methods of spiritual evolution kept closely guarded by the saints since time immemorial. The main methodology is transfer of Soul Power.

Breaking away from the centuries-old norm, He openly propagated the teachings of his Guru to all, and these methods and principles are applicable to and adaptable by people of any and all religions. Love is the objective of all Spiritual Methods. In this school 'Love' is mingled in all its methods. The central focus is on the Spiritual Master, who is looked upon as a father/ mother figure by all and who by Soul -Power uplifts the aspirants and makes them experience the higher stages of spirituality without aspirants having to make effort for it on their own. Periodic dosage of this transfer of power brings about an altered state within an aspirant. The mind must achieve a centered state before higher states can be experienced. Therefore, this school has developed its own meditation system, crafted not only to elevate aspirants to the level of receiving and experiencing Soul Power (the pinnacle of spiritual evolution and the primary objective of every religion) but also to facilitate the seamless progression of higher states, ensuring that they unfold automatically and consistently, thereby keeping the aspirant on the path.

This is probably the only school of its kind, where the method of transfer of Soul Power has evolved to such an extent that power is transferred not only on one to one basis but from one to many. At the tri-monthly meets known as 'Bhandara', organized by this Satsang, thousands of aspirants receive this power at the same time. Overtly, all are seen only to practice meditation, but each one notices and experiences the altered state upon leaving the Bhandara.

This system of Sadhana/Satsang is a synthesis between action Karma (duty), Upasana (devotion) and Gyan (knowledge). Aspirants are required to keep in touch with the Master and to meet with the Master at the least once in every three months and to do Dhyan (meditate) every morning and evening for 15–20 minutes when not in company of the Master till they achieve the desired goal.

Ramashram Satsang Mathura publishes a Monthly Spiritual Magazine in Hindi, called "Sadhan" Authentic and Official literature about the teachings and messages of Ramashram Satsang is published by Sadhan Press, Dampier Nagar, Mathura. It also organises spiritual satsang ceremonies in different places.

== History ==
The journey began back in around 1873, the year when Param Sant Mahatma Sri Ramchandra Ji Maharaj was born in the north Indian province of Mainpuri.
