= Parthasarathi Rajagopalachari =

Indian spiritualist

Parthasarathi Rajagopalachari "Chariji"
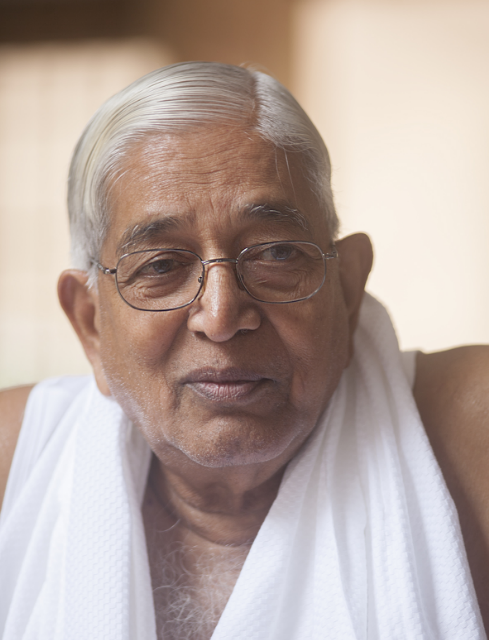
- Shri Parthasarathi Rajagopalachari, India, 2008.
- Born: 24 July 1927; Vayalur near Trichy, Tamil Nadu, India
- Died: 20 December 2014
- Organization: Shri Ram Chandra Mission
- Notable work: My Master, Yatra: India in the West & Sahaj Marg in Europe, Heart to Heart (5 Volumes), Down Memory Lane (2 Volumes), In His Footsteps (4 Volumes), Spider's Web (3 Volumes), Fruit of the Tree, What is Sahaj Marg?, Religion and Spirituality, Principles of Sahaj Marg, Love and Death, Guru and The Goal, Revealing the Personality, Role of the Master in Human Evolution, Sahaj Marg Meanderings, HeartSpeak Series (14 Volumes), Diaries of Chariji (1983–1985), वे कहते हैं (Ve Kehthe Hein, 4 Volumes in Hindi), Heart of the Lion, Messages Universal (Volume II) and Call of Spirituality (Volume I & II)
- Title: President of Shri Ram Chandra Mission (1983-2014), Founder of Sahaj Marg Spirituality Foundation (2003), Founder of Lalaji Memorial Omega International School (2005)
- Predecessor: Shri Ram Chandra of Shahjahanpur
- Successor: Kamlesh Patel (Daaji)
- Spouse: Sulochana Rajagopalachari
- Children: P. R. Krishna
- Website: Chariji

Shri Parthasarathi Rajagopalachari (24 July 1927 – 20 December 2014) better known as Chariji, was the third in the line of Raja Yoga Masters in the Sahaj Marg System of Spiritual Practice of Shri Ram Chandra Mission (SRCM).

== Early life ==
Chariji was born in a South Indian family. The eldest of four children, his father Shri C. A. Rajagopalachari served in the Indian Railways and his mother, Srimathi R. Janaki, was an amateur violinist who died when Chariji was only five years old. He had two brothers Kothandraman and Srininvasan (Seena). He also had one younger sister named Vasantha.

== Education ==
Chariji Studied Bachelor's Degree in Science in Banaras Hindu University in Varanasi. During his time, Dr.Sarvapalli Radhakrishnan was the Vice Chancellor of the University. He also Joined in U.O.T.C (University Officers' Training Corps). He was Admitted into 1st UP Battalion UOTC..ITF as a Cadet.

== Family life ==
Chariji was married to Smt. Sulochana and he had one son named P.R. Krishna. Krishna (Chariji's Son) was married to Smt. Priya and they had two Children named Bargav (Son) and Madhuri (Daughter).

== Professional life ==
After graduating from Banaras Hindu University with a B.Sc., Chariji worked for Indian Plastics Ltd. and T.T. Krishnamachari & Co., retiring from employment in 1985 as a corporate executive director in the TTK Group

== Sahaj Marg and spirituality ==
In 1964, Chariji met and became the disciple of Shri Ram Chandra of Shahjahanpur, also known as Babuji, who was the founder President of the Shri Ram Chandra Mission. As Babuji's health was deteriorating, he nominated Chariji as his successor, and after his death in 1983, Chariji became the President of the Shri Ram Chandra Mission and the third Raja Yoga Master of Sahaj Marg. He oversaw the growth and expansion of Sahaj Marg into more than 100 countries. He founded the Lalaji Memorial Omega International School in Chennai. He traveled extensively around the world giving talks and conducting seminars on Raja Yoga up until 2008.

== Final years and death ==
Chariji's health deteriorated from July 2012 until his Mahasamadhi on 20 December 2014. He was succeeded as president of the Shri Ram Chandra Mission by Kamlesh Patel, also known as Daaji.

== Sources ==
- Rajagopalachari, Parthasarathi (2014), Down Memory Lane, vol. 1 (Second ed.), ISBN 978-93-81281-06-2
- Rajagopalachari, Parthasarathi (1999), Thus Speaks Chariji (Babuji Maharaj Birth Centenary ed.), Shri Ram Chandra Mission, ISBN 0-945242-46-8
- Vasu, Prashant (2014), At the Feet of the Master - The becoming of a Disciple, A Biography of Shri Parthasarathi Rajagopalachari, vol. 1 (First ed.), Spiritual Hierarchy Publication Trust, ISBN 978-93-83516-89-6
- Rajagopalachari, Parthasarathi (2010), My Master (Second ed.), Shri Ram Chandra Mission, ISBN 978-93-80335-48-3
- Hughes, Kim (2015), Journey Beyond, Lexingford, ISBN 978-0-9859480-0-9
- Hughes, Kim (2014), The Journey Within, Lexingford, ISBN 978-0-9863343-0-6
- Callahan, Daren (2007), Yoga: An Annotated Bibliography of Works in English, 1981-2005 (First ed.), McFarland, ISBN 978-0-7864-3162-5
