= Shri Ram Chandra Mission =

Spiritual organization from India

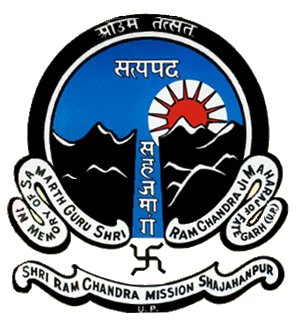
- Founded: 1945
- Founder: Ram Chandra (Babuji)
- Type: Non-profit organization
- Purpose: Yoga, Spirituality
- Region served: Worldwide
- Method: Sahaj Marg, Meditation
- Key people: Kamlesh D. Patel
- Website: www.srcm.org

Shri Ram Chandra Mission (SRCM) is an Indian non-profit organization and a spiritual movement originating. It teaches the practice of "Sahaj Marg" or "Heartfulness Meditation", was registered in 1945 by Ram Chandra of Shahjahanpur, Uttar Pradesh, and it has its current headquarters at Kanha Shanti Vanam, Kanha village, Ranga Reddy District near Hyderabad, Telangana.

== Purpose and practice ==
Shri Ram Chandra Mission teaches the "heart based" Raj Yoga meditation system known as Sahaj Marg or Heartfulness meditation.

== Organization ==
Shri Ram Chandra Mission was registered in India in the year 1945 by Ram Chandra of Shahjahanpur, also known as "Babuji". He had adopted the name Ram Chandra after his teacher Ram Chandra of Fatehgarh, also known as "Lalaji". Babuji was succeeded as president and spiritual Master of SRCM by Parthasarathi Rajagopalachari. Following his death on 20 December 2014, Kamlesh D. Patel became president of SRCM and the fourth spiritual Master of the Sahaj Marg system. The organization was also registered as SRCM USA in California in 1997.

Shri Ram Chandra Mission claims to have spread this system of meditation amongst millions of people across 160 countries worldwide. Books published by SRCM have been translated to over twenty languages and are read widely across the world. The Spiritual Hierarchy Publication Trust (SHPT) was registered on 8 April 2009, with its headquarters at Kolkata, India. The SHPT undertakes all publication activities under license from the Shri Ram Chandra Mission (SRCM) and the Sahaj Marg Spirituality Foundation (SMSF).

Shri Ram Chandra Mission is an NGO recognized by the United Nations Department of Public Information (UNDPI) as a "non-profit organization" in Denmark, the United States and India.

== Kanha Shanti Vanam ==
Kanha Shanti Vanam is a spiritual centre with integrated township located 25 kms from Rajiv Gandhi International Airport in Kanha Village, Ranga Reddy District, Hyderabad, spanning 1,200 acres. It supports extended spiritual training and mentorship programmes. The centre also supports environmental initiatives including water conservation and saving endangered plant species.

=== Activities ===
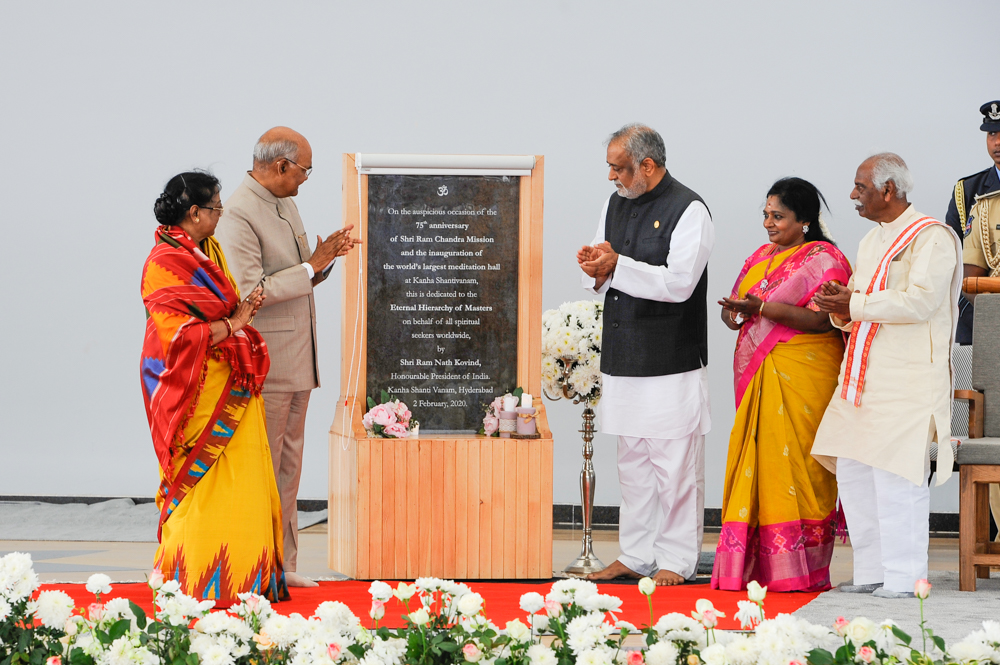
President of India unveils the World's largest meditation hall at Kanha Shanti Vanam

In February 2020 Ram Nath Kovind, the President of India, visited Kanha Shanti Vanam, the global headquarters of Shri Ram Chandra Mission, and unveiled the meditation center, which the organization claims is the largest in the world. In connection with the center there is a learning center for children between the ages of 3 and 18, and a cricket stadium.

SRCM in collaboration with the United Nations Information Centre for India and Bhutan hosts the "All India Essay Writing Event", an annual essay writing event for school and college students across the country. Prizes are awarded for national and state level winners. In 2014, a total of 185,751 students from 11,857 schools and colleges across India took part in this annual contest. In 2017, the event was hosted with participants writing essays in English, Hindi, Bengali, Gujarati, Kannada, Marathi, Malayalam, Oriya, Punjabi, Tamil and Telugu.

Shri Ram Chandra Mission, Kanha Shanti Vanam, was awarded the "Haritha Mitra" (Green Friend) Award by the Telangana government in 2016, in recognition of exemplary contribution to the greening movement undertaken by the Government of Telangana by Deputy Chief Minister Mahmood Ali of Telangana State, India.

In December 2017, Ram Nath Kovind, the then President of India, E.S.L. Narasimhan, Governor of Andhra Pradesh and Telangana, visited SRCM's Kanha Shanti Vanam Ashram and planted the 100,000th tree with Kamlesh Patel under the Green Kanha initiative.

=== Environmental Initiative ===
==== Tree Conservation ====
At Kanha Shanti Vanam, the Tree Conservation Center's project was launched by Union Agriculture Minister Mr. Narendra Singh Tomar. The centre undertook plantation of 50,000 plants over the years. A contemporary tissue culture laboratory has been built to aid in the propagation of critically endangered plant and tree species. Tissue culture is used in addition to the traditional methods of seed propagation, cutting, and layering.

==== Rainforest ====
The Rainforest in Kanha Shanti Vanam, which is grown in the formerly arid Nandigama Mandal, covers five to six acres, claims to have increased the area's green cover and has become home to vulnerable and endangered species in the past four to five years.

==== Water Conservation ====
There are twelve water harvesting ponds built to replenish the groundwater surrounding the site. The year 2017 saw the first significant rainfall in the area after 120 years of drought-like conditions. The increased green cover is claimed to be the reason for this change in climate.

=== Facilities ===
==== Meditation Hall ====
Kanha Shanti Vanam claims to have the largest meditation centre in the world, accommodating 100,000 people at a time for meditation.

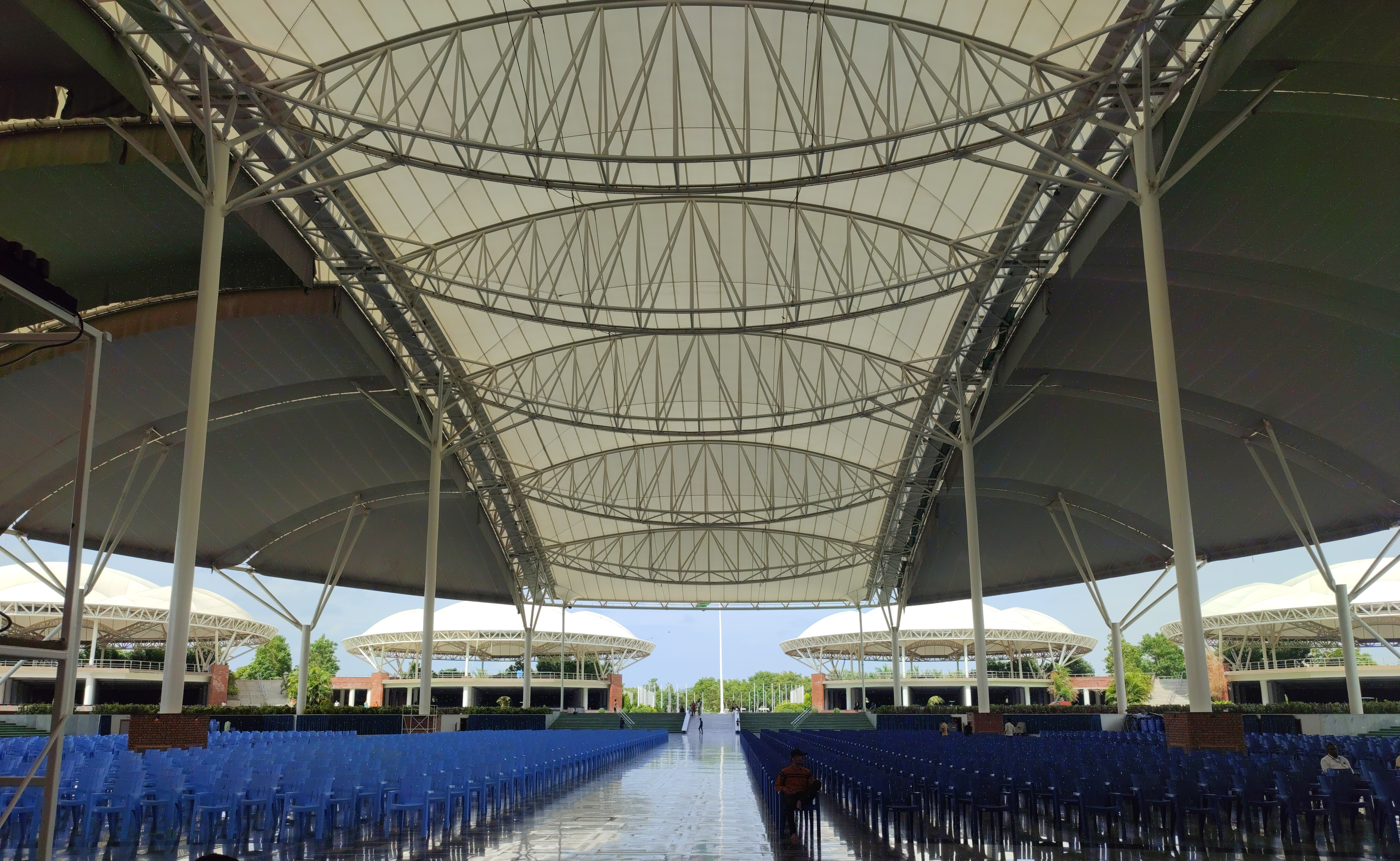
Kanha Shanti Vanam meditation centre

==== Medical Center ====
The medical center has adequate medical facilities to assist the local populations and visitors. Shri Thaneeru Harish Rao, the Telangana government's honourable minister of finance, health, medical care, and family welfare, officially inaugurated the Kanha Medical Centre.

==== Heartfulness Learning Center ====
As part of its educational activities, the Heartfulness Institute has established the "Heartfulness Learning Center," which intends to offer children from Pre-KG through Grade 8. Mr. Suresh Prabhu, Union Minister for Commerce and Civil Aviation, and his wife Mrs. Uma Prabhu attended the inauguration of the Learning Center.

=== Events ===
A conference for "Rising with Kindness" took place between 12 and 14 August 2022. As per Heartfulness Institute, the goal of the conference was to promote acts of kindness for oneself, others, and the environment. In addition to raising understanding of Indian culture and heritage amongst youth, the programme aimed to connect young leaders for sustainable development and offer more possibilities with Heartfulness through yoga, meditation, and interfaith conversation.

The first ever international conference on integrative health and wellbeing (IHW), took place in Kanha Shanti Vanam between 16 and 18 December 2022. The conference combined traditional with integrative holistic approaches to health and wellness that are supported by research. Several prestigious national and international institutions provided support for the conference. Dr. Mansukh Mandaviya, the then Union Minister for Health, Family Welfare, and Chemicals and Fertilisers, delivered the conference's keynote address alongside Shri Kamlesh Patel, the Global Guide of Heartfulness Meditation.

In 2024, Kanha Shanti Vanam hosted several interfaith and cultural events, including the Global Spirituality Mahotsav held from 14 to 17 March 2024, organized in collaboration with the Ministry of Culture, Government of India, which featured participants from diverse spiritual backgrounds.
