= Kamlesh Patel (Daaji) =

Spiritual Master and Leader from India

Kamlesh D. Patel (Daaji)
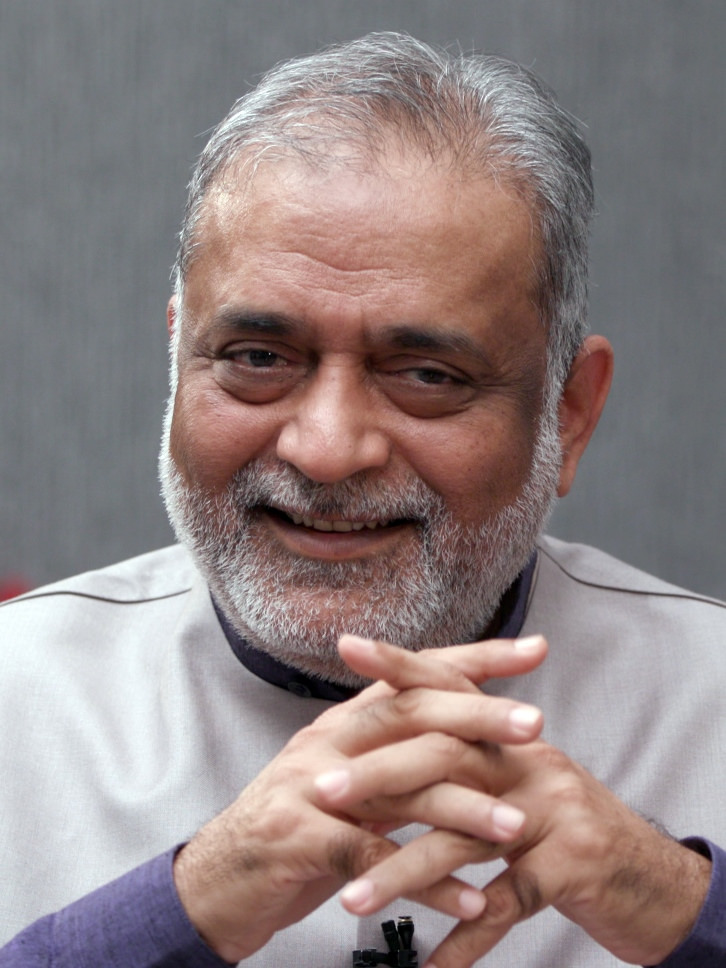
- Born: Kamlesh Desaibhai Patel; 28 September 1956 (age 70); Kala, Gujarat, India
- Organization(s): Shri Ram Chandra Mission, Heartfulness Institute, Heartfulness Education Trust
- Notable work: The Heartfulness Way (2018)
- Title: President of Shri Ram Chandra Mission, Global Guide of Heartfulness Institute, Founder of Heartfulness Education Trust, Managing Trustee of Sahaj Marg Spirituality Foundation
- Predecessor: Shri Parthasarathi Rajagopalachari
- Awards: Padma Bhushan
- Website: Daaji.org

Kamlesh D. Patel (born 1956) also known as Daaji among his followers, is a spiritual leader, author and the fourth in the line of Rāja yoga masters in the Sahaj Marg system of spiritual practice. He has been the president of Shri Ram Chandra Mission, a non-profit organization founded in 1945 and associated with the United Nations Department of Public Information, since 2014.

== Early life ==
Kamlesh Patel was born in Gujarat in 1956. He trained as a pharmacist in Ahmedabad, and as a pharmacy student he started practising the Sahaj Marg system of Raja Yoga meditation in 1976 under the guidance of Ram Chandra of Shahjahanpur.

== Professional life ==
He moved to New York City after graduating with honours from L M College of Pharmacy, Ahmedabad. In America, he did his post graduate degree and built a pharmaceutical business while being married and raising two sons.

== Sahaj Marg ==
Kamlesh Patel started practising Sahaj Marg in 1976, when he was a pharmacology student, under the guidance of a trainer. He subsequently received training from Ram Chandra. After Ram Chandra’s passing in 1983, Patel became a disciple of Parthasarathi Rajagopalachari (Chariji), the second president of Shri Ram Chandra Mission. In October 2011, he was nominated as Chariji's successor and after Chariji's death in December 2014, he became the spiritual guide of Sahaj Marg system and third president of Shri Ram Chandra Mission. He has conducted various workshops on spirituality across India, USA and many different parts of the world.

== Awards and recognition ==
In 2018, Kamlesh Patel was conferred an honorary doctorate from Sri Venkateswara University. In 2020, he received the Ramkrishna Bajaj Memorial Global Award from the Priyadarshini Academy. In 2023, he was awarded the Padma Bhushan, a civilian award given for "distinguished service of a high order" in India as well as the UK-India Triumph Awards from the ABPL Group. In 2024, Kamlesh Patel was recognized as the Global Ambassador of Peacebuilding and Faith by the Commonwealth and granted the Freedom of the City of London by the City of London Corporation.

== Books ==
Patel co-authored a book called The Heartfulness Way with Joshua Pollock in 2018. A sequel was published in 2025.

His book Designing Destiny was released in February 2019.

A book named The Wisdom Bridge was released in 2022.

His fourth book, Spiritual Anatomy: Meditation, Chakras, and the Journey to the Center, was released in US and Canada in October 2023 and later at other places including India.

He has also written a book called The Power of Paradox. It was released in late 2024.

A book - Holy Tirthankars In the Light of Heartfulness, which he has co-authored with B. Rathinasabapathy was released in 2025.

The Heart of Lord Ram Reflected in Yoga Vasishtha, Five Prescriptions for the Soul from the Ashtavakra Mahagita, The Heart of Jainism : Where Soul Meets Science, Antaryamin : Rediscovering the Temple Within are also the books written by him.

Tales from the Vedas and Upanishads and Timeless Tales from the Puranas and Itihaas are the story books authored by him.
