= Upasana =

Hindu philosophical concept

Upasana (Sanskrit: उपासना upāsanā) literally means "worship" and "sitting near, attend to". It refers to the worship of, or meditation on, formless things, such as Absolute Self, the Holy, the Atman (Soul) Principle, distinguishing meditative reverence for an internalized and intellectual concept from earlier forms of physical worship, actual sacrifices and offerings to Vedic deities.

The term also refers to one of three khaṇḍa (खण्ड, parts) of Vedas, one that focuses on worship or meditation. The other two parts of Vedas are called Aranyakas and Upanishads, sometimes identified as karma-khaṇḍa (कर्म खण्ड, ritualistic sacrifice section) and jñāna-khaṇḍa (ज्ञान खण्ड, knowledge, spirituality section).

== Etymology ==
The root of the Sanskrit word Upasana is up and asana (from as), which means "to sit close to someone, waiting on someone with reverence". Oldenberg explained Upasana from its root Upās-, in German as Verehren, or "to worship, adore, revere", with the clarification that in Vedic texts this adoration and reverence is at formless things, such as Absolute Self, the Holy, the Atman (Soul) Principle. These texts offer the concept of Upasana to distinguish meditative reverence for an internalized and intellectual concept from earlier forms of physical worship, actual sacrifices and offerings to Vedic deities. Schayer offered a different perspective, stating Upasana in Vedic context is closer to the German word Umwerben or Bedrängen, or courting and pressing on metaphysical Soul, the Absolute Self (the Brahman) with hopes and petitions. Schayer further states that Upasana was a psychological act as well as a procedure, which etymologically was further developed by Renou.

== Meditation and identification ==
In one contemporary context, Upasana means methods of worship (Bhakti), usually of meditative kind. Werner translates it as "meditation", while Murty translates it as "steadfastness of mind in the thing meditated upon". Upasana is also sometimes referred to as Puja. However, a formal Puja is just one type of worship in Indian philosophy. Paul Deussen translates upasana as "meditation" and "worship", depending on the context.

The concept of Upasana developed a large tradition in Vedanta era. Edward Crangle, in his review, states that Upasana in Vedic text initially developed as a form of "substitute sacrifice", where symbolic meditation of the Aranyakas practice, instead of actual sacrifice ritual, offered a means to gain the same merit without the sacrifice. Over time, this idea shifted from meditating about the ritual, to internalization and meditation of the ideas and concepts associated. This may have marked a key evolution in Vedic era, one from ritual sacrifices to one contemplating spiritual ideas.

It flowered into the meaning of an intense kind of systematic meditation and identification. Adi Shankara described Upasana as a kind of dhyana -- meditation "about someone or something, consisting of continuous succession of comparable basic concepts, without interspersing it with dissimilar concepts, that proceeds according to the scriptures and on idea enjoined in the scriptures." It is a state of concentration where "whatever is meditated upon" is completely identified, absorbed with self, and unified with as one identifies self consciousness with one's body. The two become one, "you are that". The "someone or something" in Upasana can be a symbolic deity or an abstract concept, states Shankara. Upasana entails more than mere concentration or sitting in dhyana; it is being one with god, which manifests as "be a god", and by "being a god, he attains the god," living this identity with god in daily life.

== Classification of texts ==
In other contexts, Upasana refers to a part of the Vedic era texts relating to worship or meditation. The first parts of Vedas, composed the earliest, relate to sacrificial rituals. The second parts are Upasana-kanda, and the last parts relate to abstract philosophy and spirituality which are popularly called the Upanishads.

Vedic literature, including Upasana Karunakar, is neither homogeneous in content nor in structure. Multiple classifications have been proposed. For example, the early part of Vedas with mantras and prayers called Samhitas along with the commentary on rituals called the Brahmanas together are identified as the ceremonial karma-khaṇḍa, while rituals and metaphoric-rituals part called Aranyakas and knowledge/spirituality part Upanishads are referred to as the jñāna-khaṇḍa.

In some cases, the Upasana chapters are embedded inside the Aranyakas. For example, in Rig Veda, the first five of its books are called Aitareya Aranyaka. The 2nd and 3rd books are theosophical, and the first three sections of the 2nd book are called Prana Upasana (literally meaning, "worship of the vital energy"). The last three sections of the 2nd book constitute the Aitareya Upanishad. The 3rd book of Rig Veda refers to Samhita Upasana (literally meaning, "unified form of worship"). Rig Veda has many books, and it includes many more Upasanas and Upanishads. Other Vedas follow a similar structure where they offer sections on rituals and action (Aranyakas), worship and deity oriented bhakti (Upasanas), as well as philosophical and abstract spirituality sections (Upanishads).
