= Sahaj Marg =

Form of Raja Yoga meditation

Sahaj Marg or Heartfulness Meditation is a set of meditative practices first developed at the turn of the twentieth century and formalized into teaching through Shri Ram Chandra Mission in 1945. It is a form of Raja Yoga meditation system. Use of pranahuti or yogic transmission and the cleaning of impressions (called samskaras) are claimed to be unique to this method.

The Heartfulness Movement's headquarters is located in Kanha Shanti Vanam near Hyderabad in Telangana, India. The current global guide of the organization is Kamlesh Patel (Daaji).

== History ==
The organizational body Shri Ram Chandra Mission was formally registered in 1945 by Ram Chandra (1899-1983). As part of the Sahaj Marg spiritual practice, Ram Chandra adopted a technique called pranahuti as taught by his spiritual master bearing the same name Ram Chandra of Fatehgarh in India (popularly called "Lalaji" by his followers).

== Practice ==
The system involves daily and weekly practices including solitary and group meditation. Heartfulness practices include relaxation, meditation, cleaning (or rejuvenation) and prayer.

== See also ==
- Spirituality
- Raja Yoga
