= Ram Chandra (Babuji) =

Indian spiritual leader

Shri Ram Chandraji Maharaj (Babuji)
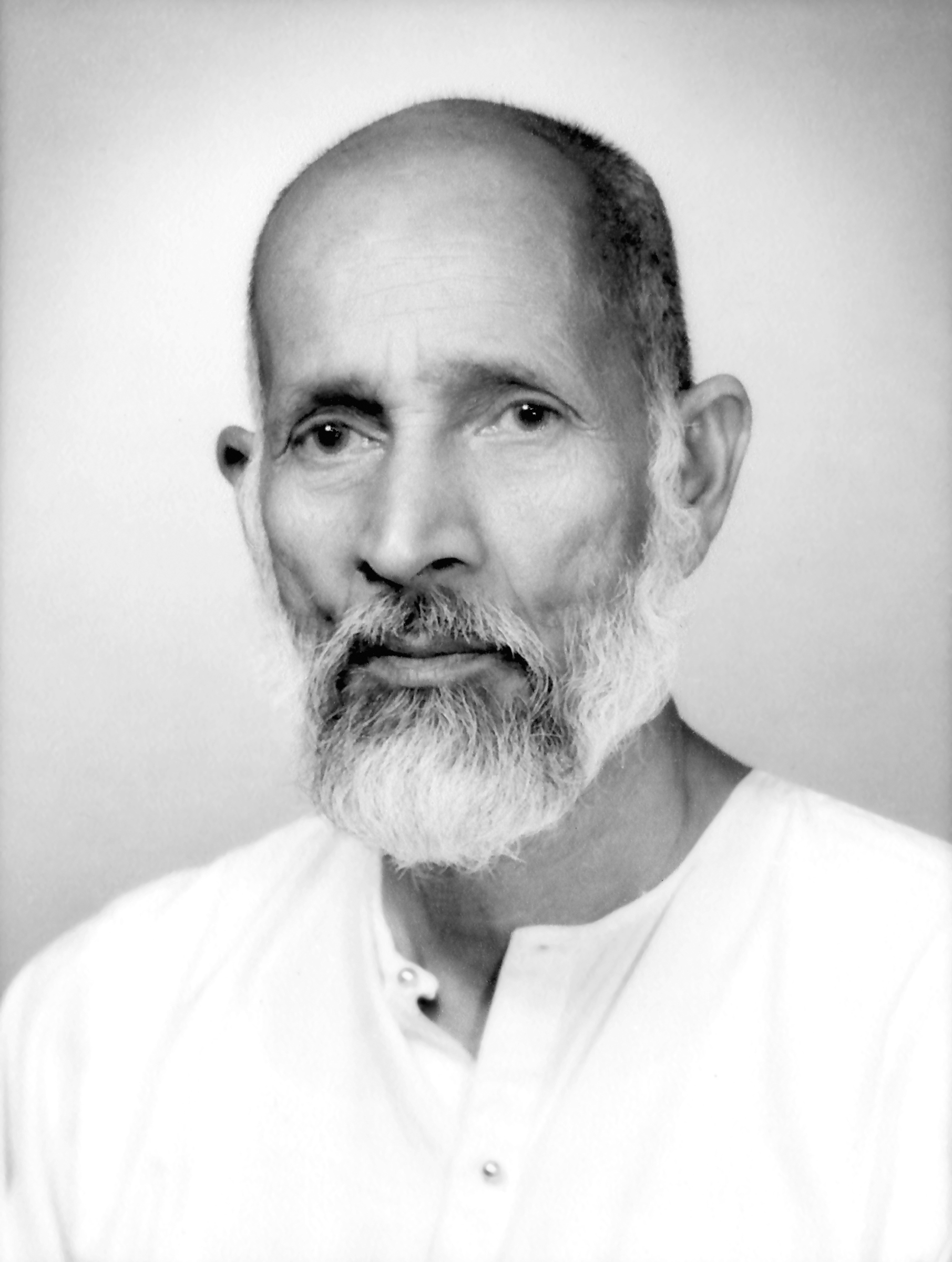
- Title: Founder, Shri Ram Chandra Mission

Personal life
- Born: Ram Chandra; 30 April 1899 Shahjahanpur, Uttar Pradesh, India
- Died: 19 April 1983
- Spouse: Bhagwati

Religious life
- Institute: Shri Ram Chandra Mission
- Founder of: Shri Ram Chandra Mission (1945)
- Philosophy: Sahaj Marg, Raja Yoga

Shri Ram Chandra of Shahjahanpur (1899-1983), also known as Babuji, was a yogi from Uttar Pradesh in northern India. He spent most of his life developing a method of Raja Yoga meditation called Sahaj Marg. He founded an organization called Shri Ram Chandra Mission in 1945, dedicated and named after his teacher, who was also called Ram Chandra.

== Early life ==
Ram Chandra was born on 30 April 1899 in Shahjahanpur, Uttar Pradesh, India. His family was well off. His father Rai Bahadur Shri Badri Prasad held the position of Honorary Special Magistrate 1st Class.His mother Shrimati Jashodadevi was a pious lady.

He left school after his matriculation, and worked in the local court for thirty-one years as a record keeper. In June 1922, at the age of twenty-three, he met the spiritual teacher Ram Chandra, who lived in Fatehgarh.

== Spiritual life ==
He learnt the Raja Yoga meditation practice from Ram Chandra of Fatehgarh. He developed the method with the intention of making it more applicable in the contemporary world. He founded and registered a non-profit organization called Shri Ram Chandra Mission in 1945 to teach this new method, which he called Sahaj Marg.

== Bibliography ==
- Reality at Dawn (1954) ISBN 9789388095624
- Efficacy of Raja Yoga in the Light of Sahaj Marg ISBN 9789388095594
- Commentary on the Ten Maxims of Sahaj Marg (1946) ISBN 9789388095617
- Towards Infinity (1957)
- Sahaj Marg Philosophy (1978) ISBN 9789388095655
- Voice Real - The First Selection (1970)
- Voice Real - The Second Selection
- Autobiography of Ram Chandra (Volume 1 and 2) (1974)
