= Sopater (disambiguation) =

Sopater (Ancient Greek: Σώπατρος) may refer to:

- Sopater, New Testament figure, the son of Pyrhus
- Sopater of Paphos, a writer of parody and burlesque, who flourished from 323 B.C. to 283 B.C.
- Sopater (poet), author of at least 12 books of Eclogues, see Callixenus of Rhodes
- Sopater of Apamea, 4th century sophist
- Sopater (mythology), a legendary man from Athens
