= Olympian 10 =

Ode by Pindar

- by Pindar
- Country: Ancient Greece
- Series: Olympian
- Genre(s): Epinikion
- Publication date: 476 B.C.

Olympian 10 is an ode by Pindar that celebrates the victory of Locrian boxer Hagesidamus at the Olympian games of 476 B.C.

== History ==
Hagesidamus was raised in Epizephyrian Locris (now Locri), a city located in modern-day Southern Italy. He was the son of Archestratos. He was trained by Ilas, who Pindar described as having helped him succeed in the Olympic games similar to how Achilles helped Patroklos in warfare. Pindar also stated in the poem that Hagesidamus shared the youth and beauty of Ganymede, for which reason he would be similarly spared from living a mortal life and thus be "immortalized" in his poem.
