= Phlyax play =

Type of Ancient Greek play

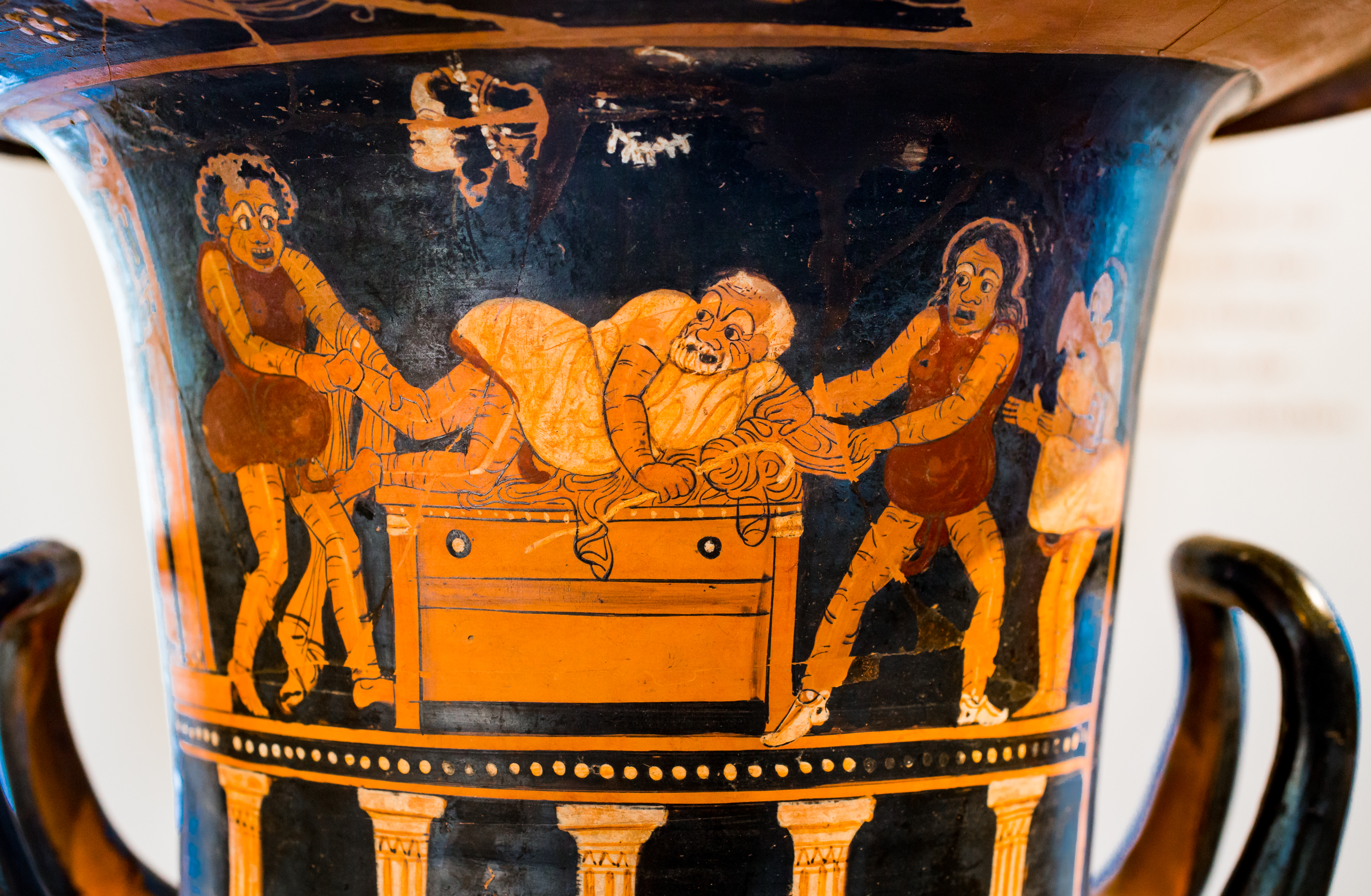
Three men robbing a miser in his house, in a scene from a phlyax play painted by Asteas; c. 350–340 BC

A phlyax play (Ancient Greek: φλύαξ, pl: φλύακες, phlyakes), also known as a hilarotragedy (Ἱλαροτραγῳδία lit. 'cheerful tragedy'), was a burlesque dramatic form that developed in the Greek colonies of Magna Graecia in the 4th century BC. From the surviving fragments and titles of the plays, they appear to have been a form of mythological burlesque, which mixed figures from the Greek pantheon with the stock characters and situations of Attic Comedy.

While the plays themselves survive only as titles and a few fragments, a substantial body of South Italian vases which survive today are generally thought to represent phlyax-related imagery. These vases depict lively and entertaining theatrical scenes of contemporary Athenian comedies as well as lesser known local productions. Distinct phlyax plays, blending tragic and comic elements, became well defined only in the late 4th century BC onwards by the dramatist Rhinthon. Five authors of this genre are known by name; Rhinthon and Sciras of Taranto, Blaesus of Capri, Sopater of Paphos and Heraclides.

== Name ==
The name 'Phlyax' came to designate both the actors in the play as well as the performances as a whole. There are two possible origins of the name: the Greek verb φλυαρεῖν (phlyarein) ('to talk nonsense'), or the verb φλέω (phleo) ('to swell'), these words being etymologically related. The latter is sometimes regarded as more likely given the actors' well-padded costumes that were typical for phlyax plays and also appeared frequently on Corinthian vases. Additionally, the adjective φλέος (phleos) or φλεών (phleon) ('tumid') was attributed to Dionysus who is often portrayed as company of phlyax actors, while such performances were typically given in his honor.

== Characteristics ==
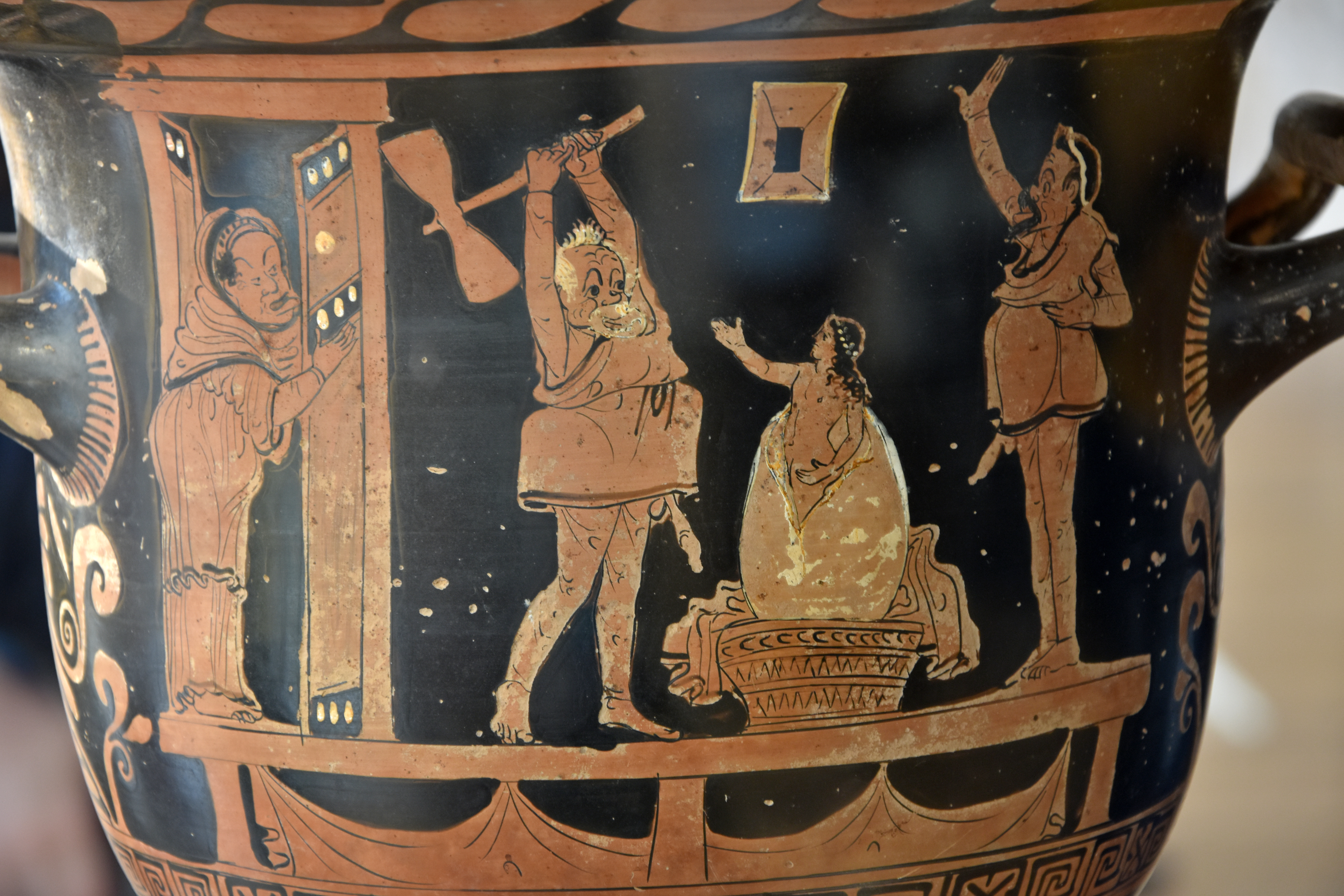
Phlyax scene parodying the birth of Helen out the egg which was laid by Leda. The events take place on a stage with elements of set design such as a usable door; c. 380–370 BC

Nossis of Locri provides the closest contemporary explanation of the genre in her epitaph for Rhinthon:

Pass by with a loud laugh and a kindly word
For me: Rhinthon of Syracuse am I,
The Muses' little nightingale; and yet
For tragic farce I plucked an ivy wreath.

Textual and archaeological evidence give a partial picture of these burlesques of mythology and daily life. The absence of any surviving script has led some to conjecture that the plays were largely improvised. On the other hand, others have argued that it is more likely for the phlyax plays to have been in fact performed by itinerant actors who carried with them their own stage, necessary props, and costumes. Those actors would have had their own repertory of plays which they performed and might have adapted their plays, either Athenian and local productions, in order to better fit each occasion.

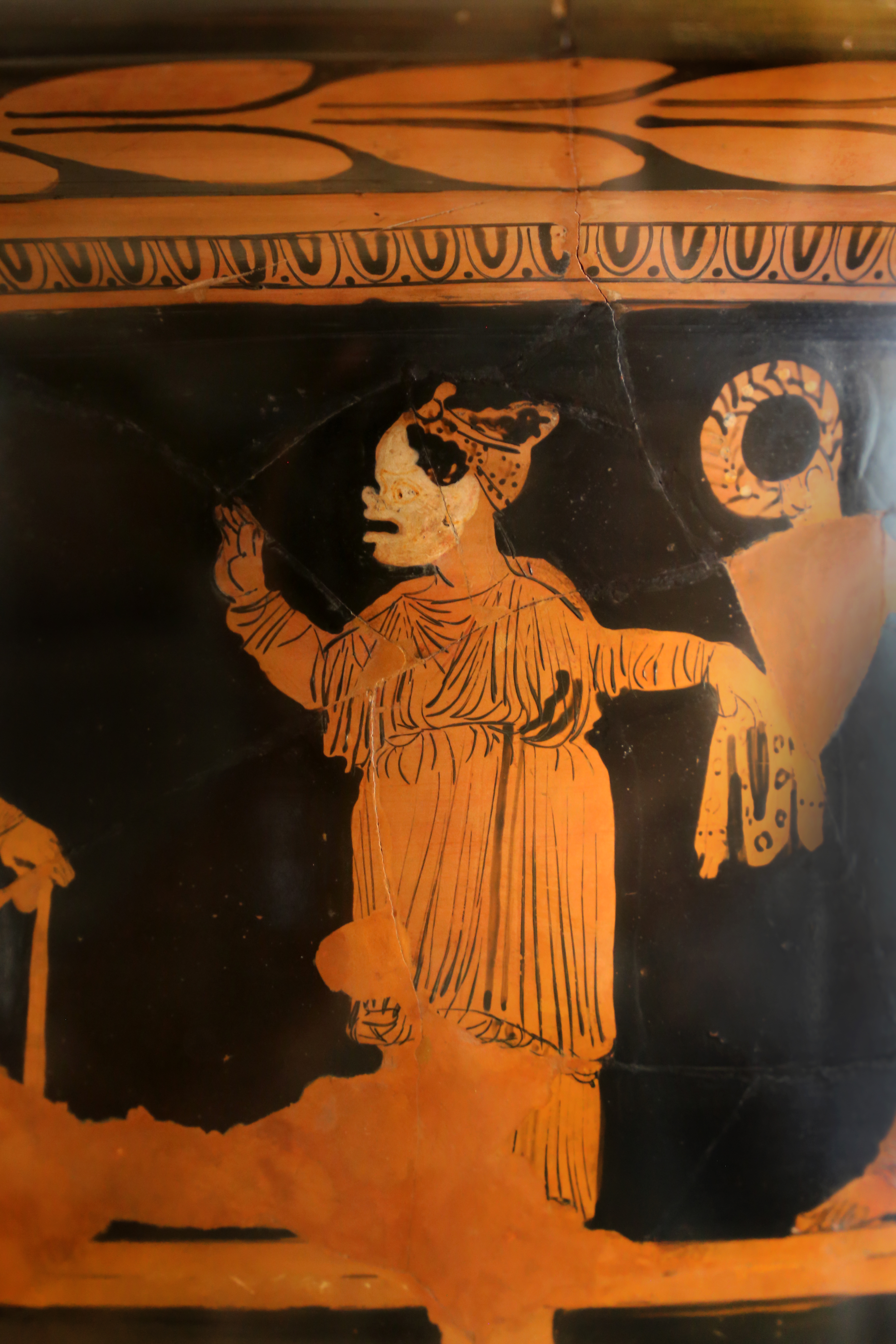
Portrayal of a female phlyax character with a typical burlesque white mask, c. 380–370 BC

The vase paintings indicate that they were performed on a raised wooden stage with an upper gallery, and that the actors wore grotesque costumes and masks similar to those of Attic Old Comedy. Acrobatics and farcical scenes were major features of the phlyax. The standard costume of the phlyax actors was made of tight fits that represented nudity and a large padding on the back and front, on which a phallus was attached. The actors could wear additional clothes, such as cloaks, which are sometimes shown painted with various colors, while their faces were covered with masks. For female roles in particular, the actors wore typical long dresses, while their masks were often painted in white.

The phlyakes seems to die out by the late 3rd century, but the Oscan inhabitants of Campania subsequently developed a tradition of farces, parodies, and satires influenced by late Greek models, which became popular in Rome during the 3rd century BCE. This genre was known as Atellan farce, Atella being the name of a Campanian town. Atellan farce introduced a set of stock characters such as Maccus and Bucco to Latin comedy; even in antiquity, these were thought to be the ancestors of the characters found in Plautus, and perhaps distantly of those of commedia dell'arte. Although an older view held that Attic comedy was the only source of Roman comedy, it has been argued that Rhinthon in particular influenced Plautus's Amphitruo.

== Vase paintings ==
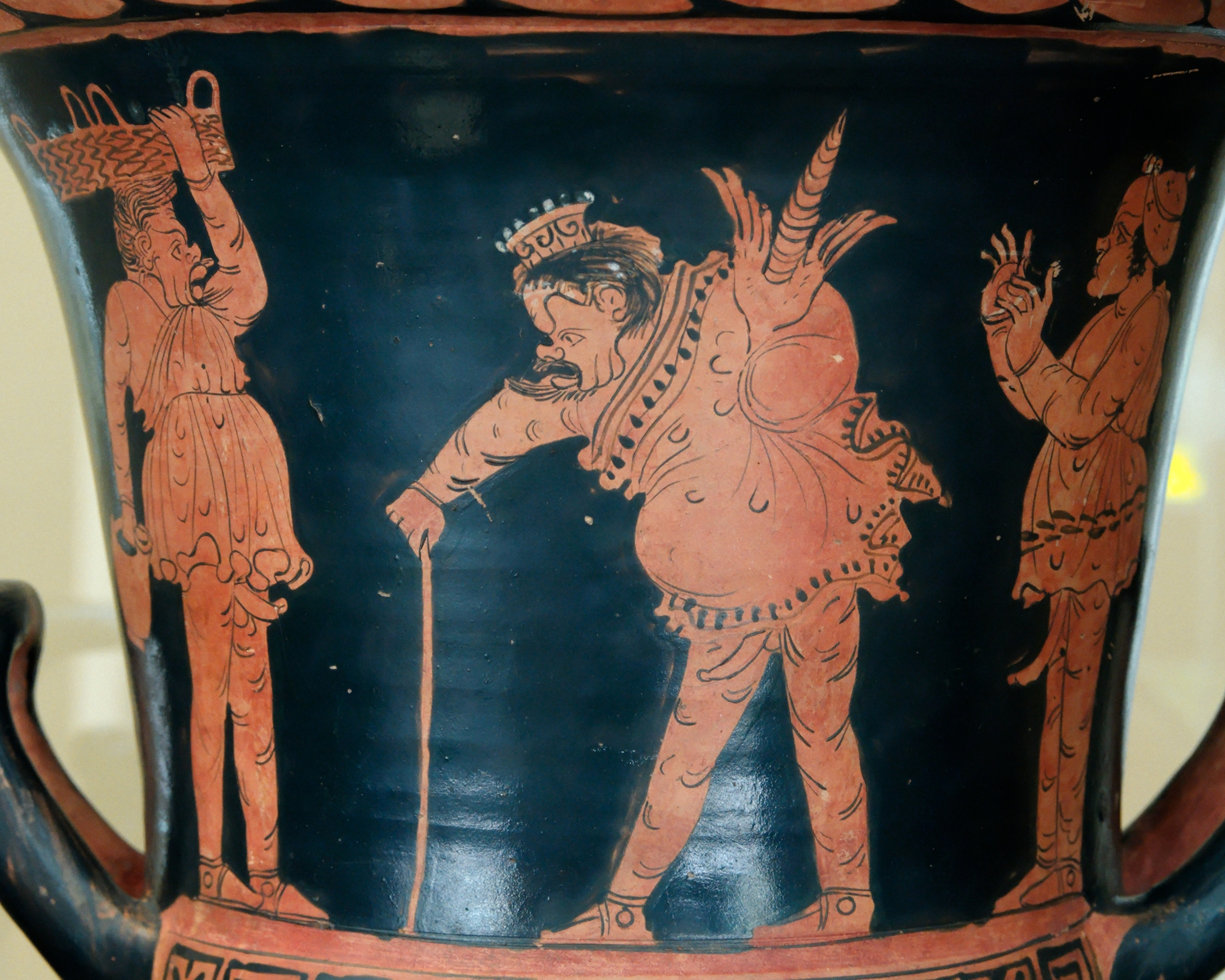
Zeus (middle) walking with a cane and holding a thunderbolt while an aulos-player (right) marks the rhythm; a bystander watches with a basket on his head. Red-figure calyx-krater, 380–360 BC.

The so-called phlyax vases are a principal source of information on the genre. By 1967, 185 of these vases had been identified. Since depictions of theatre and especially comedy are rare in fabrics other than the South Italian, these have been thought to portray the distinctly local theatre tradition. The vases first appeared at the end of the 5th century BCE, but most are 4th century. They represent grotesque characters, the masks of comedy, and the props of comic performance such as ladders, baskets, and open windows. About a quarter of them depict a low wooden temporary stage, but whether this was used in reality is a point of contention.

More recent scholarship views the early fourth-century BC phlyax vases as depicting scenes from Attic Old Comedy, rather than distinct phlyax plays, which would not become well defined until the time of Rhinthon. The Wurzburg Telephus Travestitus vase (bell krater, H5697) was identified in 1980 as a phlyax vase, but Csapo and Taplin independently have argued that it actually represents the Thesmophoriazousai of Aristophanes.

== Gallery ==
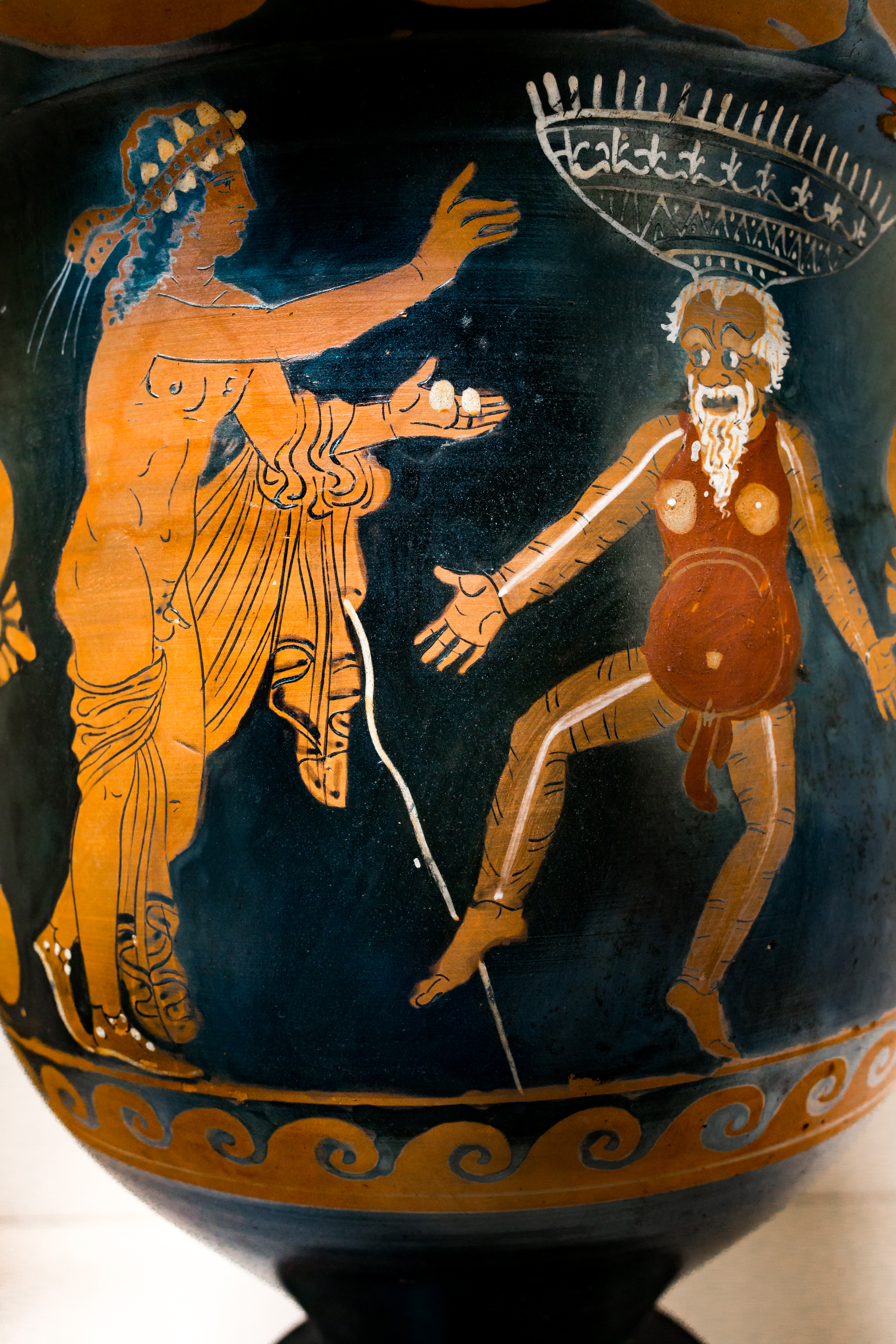
Dionysus offering two eggs or fruits to a dancing Phlyax while he balances a basket on his head, c. 360–340 BC

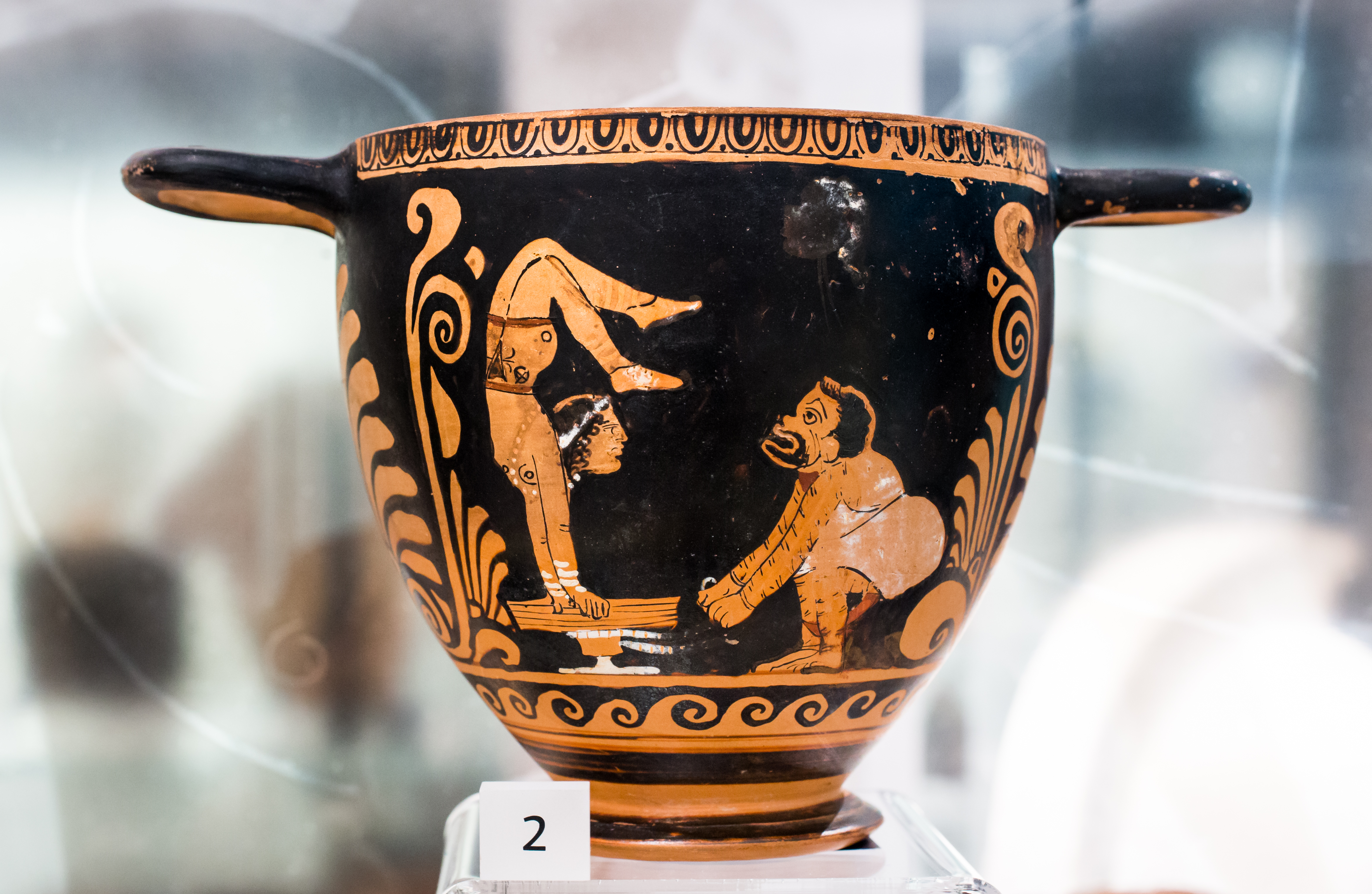
Female acrobat on a turn-table and a Phlyax, c. 360–340 BC

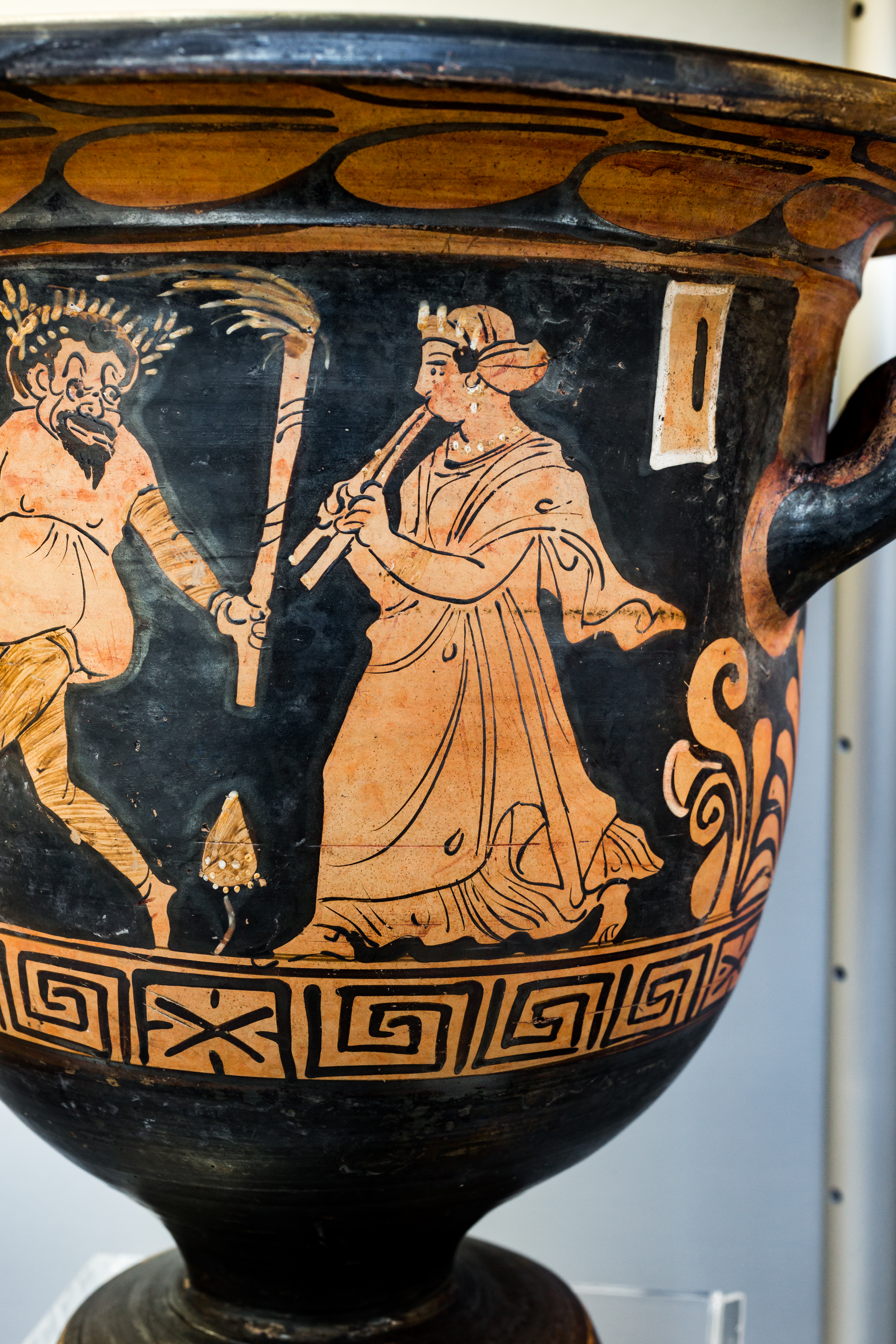
A wreathed Phlyax with torches dances to a woman playing the aulos, c. 340–320 BC

== Bibliography ==
- Trendall, Arthur Dale (1991). "Farce and Tragedy in South Italian Vase Painting". In Spivey, Nigel; Rasmussen, Tom (eds.). Looking at Greek Vases. Cambridge: Cambridge University Press. pp. 151–182. ISBN 9780521376792.
- Jendza, Craig (2020). Paracomedy, Appropriations of Comedy in Greek Tragedy. Cambridge University Press. ISBN 9780190090937.
- Rudolf Kassel and Colin Austin. Poetae Comici Graeci, 2001.
- Klaus Neiiendam. Art of Acting Antiquity: Iconographical Studies in Classical, Hellenistic and Byzantine Theatre.
- Oliver Taplin. Comic Angels: And Other Approaches to Greek Drama Through Vase-Paintings.
- Trendall, Arthur Dale (1967). Phlyax Vases (2 ed.). London: Institute of Classical Studies.
- AD Trendall and TBL Webster. Monuments Illustrating Greek Drama, 1971.
