= Nossis =

Ancient Greek poet

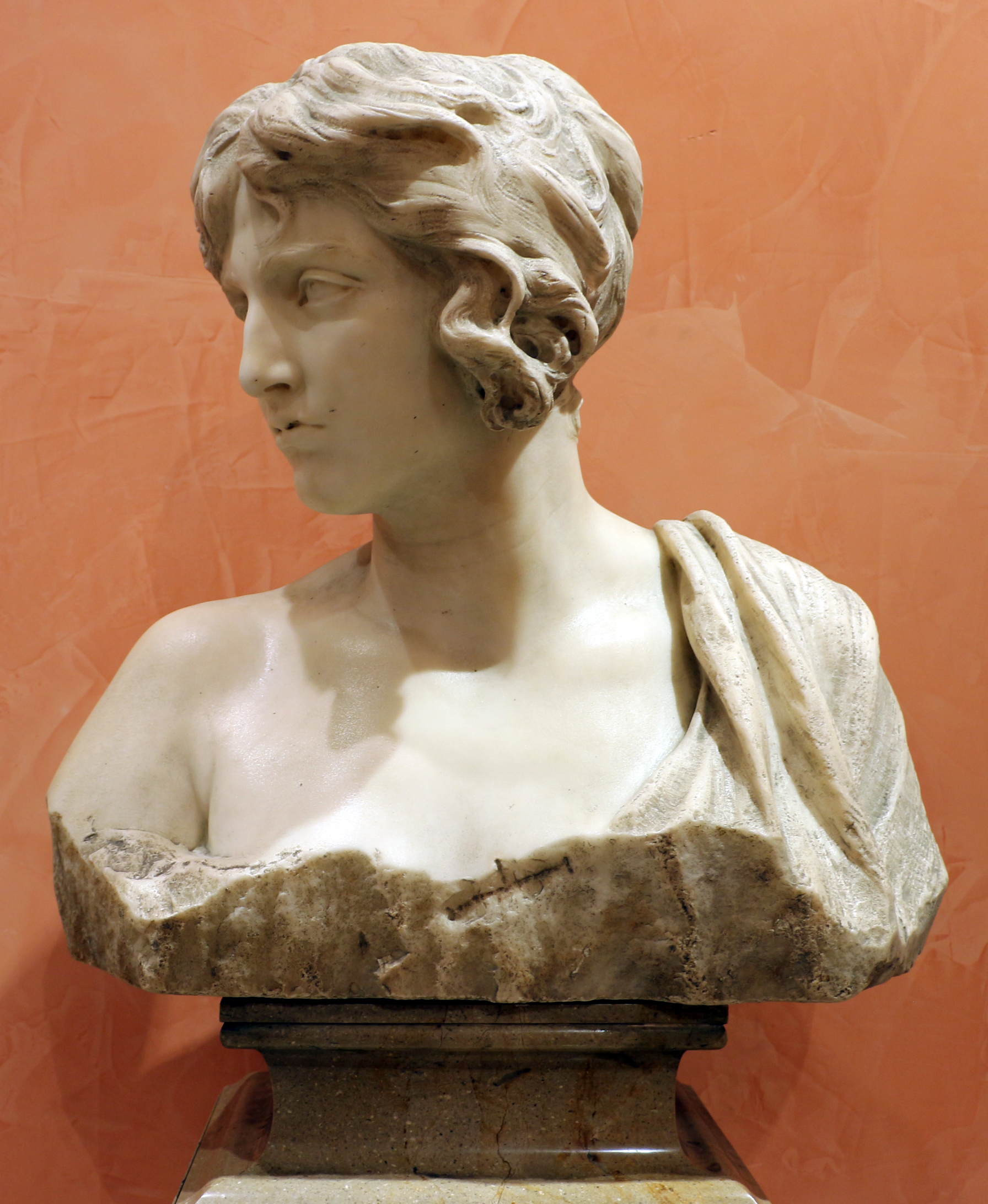
Marble bust of Nossis by Francesco Jerace

Nossis (Ancient Greek: Νοσσίς, fl. c. 300 BC) was a Hellenistic poet from Epizephyrian Locris in Magna Graecia. Probably well-educated and from a noble family, Nossis was influenced by and claimed to rival Sappho. Eleven or twelve of her epigrams, mostly religious dedications and epitaphs, survive in the Greek Anthology. Her work is known for its focus on women, their lives and world; modern scholars such as Marilyn B. Skinner have argued that Nossis consciously positioned herself as part of a female literary tradition, in contrast to that of male poets such as Pindar.

Though she is one of the best-preserved ancient Greek women poets, her work does not seem to have entered the Greek literary canon. In the twentieth century, the imagist poet H. D. was influenced by Nossis, as was Renée Vivien in her French translation of the ancient Greek women poets.

== Life ==
Nossis was from Epizephyrian Locris in Magna Graecia (modern Locri in Calabria, southern Italy). She was probably from a noble family. According to one of her surviving epigrams, her mother was called Theuphilis and her grandmother was Cleocha. She was probably active in the early third century BC, as she wrote an epitaph for the dramatist Rhinthon. The sophistication of her poetry suggests that she was relatively well-educated.

== Work ==
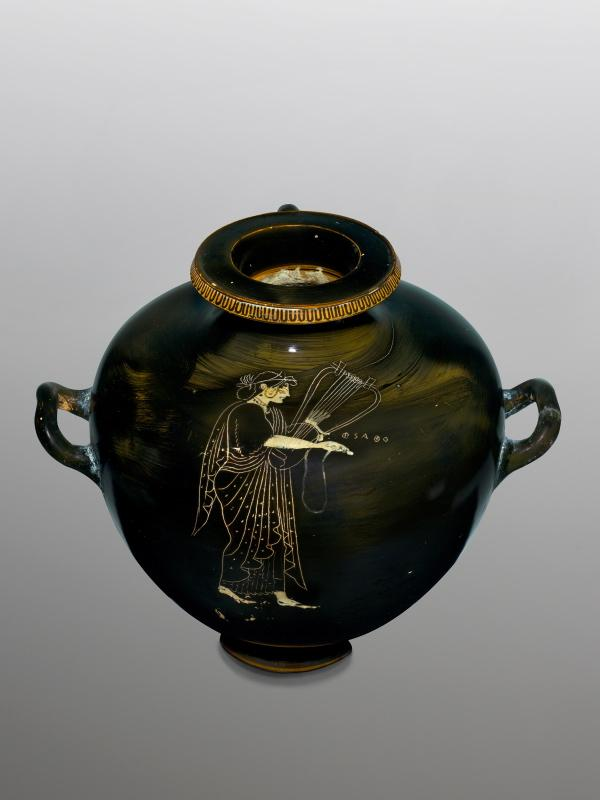
Sappho, shown here on a sixth-century BC vase, was a significant influence on Nossis

Nossis is one of the best preserved Greek women poets, with twelve four-line epigrams attributed to her included in the Greek Anthology. The authorship of one of these is uncertain – the heading it is given in the Anthology may mean "in the style of Nossis" or "allegedly by Nossis". It is stylistically and metrically similar to Nossis' other poetry, but may be a later imitation. Like other Hellenistic poets, Nossis probably published her epigrams; it is disputed whether they were also inscribed, or were purely literary productions. Two of Nossis' epigrams preserved in the Greek Anthology may have originally been the opening and closing poems of her own collection; these are not inscriptional and would have been composed for the book.

Nossis' poetry is composed in a literary Doric dialect. The majority of her epigrams are about women. She primarily wrote epigrams for religious dedications and epitaphs; four are dedications of women's portraits. Unlike other Hellenistic dedicatory epigrams, which are commonly written from the point of view of a neutral observer, the narrative voice in her dedications is that of someone with a personal connection to the dedicant.

Nossis' poetry is known for its focus on women, their world, and subjects relevant to them. Two-thirds of her surviving poetry is about women. Marilyn B. Skinner suggests that it was originally written for an audience of close female companions, and identifies Nossis as an early example of the "recognizably female literary voice". In antiquity, Antipater of Thessalonica described her as "female-tongued" in his epigram about women poets; Laurel Bowman suggests that this is evidence that the focus on women in Nossis' surviving work is representative of her entire poetic output.

In her poetry Nossis claims her place in a lineage of female poets following Sappho and Erinna, as well as being concerned with biological female relationships such as her descent from her mother Theuphilis and grandmother Cleocha. Her epigrams were inspired by Sappho, whom she claims to rival; several of her poems contain linguistic allusions to Sappho. One (A. P. 5.170, possibly the opening poem to her collection) is modeled after Sappho's fragment 16; it may also allude to Sappho fr. 55. Marilyn B. Skinner argues that as well as laying claim to the legacy of Sappho, this poem also rejects the male tradition of lyric poetry represented by Pindar. In another poem (A. P. 7.718, the closing poem), Nossis portrays herself as one of Sappho's companions, separated from her like the absent woman in Sappho 96.

ὦ ξειν', εἰ τύ γε πλεῖς ποτί καλλίχοραν Μιτυλήναν
τᾶν Σαπφοῦς χαρίτων ἄνθος ἐναυσόμενος,
εἰπεῖν ὡς Μούσαισι †φίλαν τήνᾳ τε Λόκρις γᾶ
τίκτε μ' ἴσαις δ' ὅτι μοι† τοὔνομα Νοσσὶς ἴθι.

Translation:

Wayfarer, if you sail to Mitylene, city of beautiful choral dances,
to draw inspiration from the bloom of Sappho's graces,
say that the Locrian earth bore me,
dear to the Muses and to her. Having learned that my name is Nossis, go.

As well as Sappho, Nossis also references Homer and Hesiod, and perhaps Alcaeus and Anacreon; she may have also been influenced by Erinna and Anyte. Meleager of Gadara describes Nossis as a love poet in his Garland, though only one of her surviving epigrams is about love.

== Reception ==
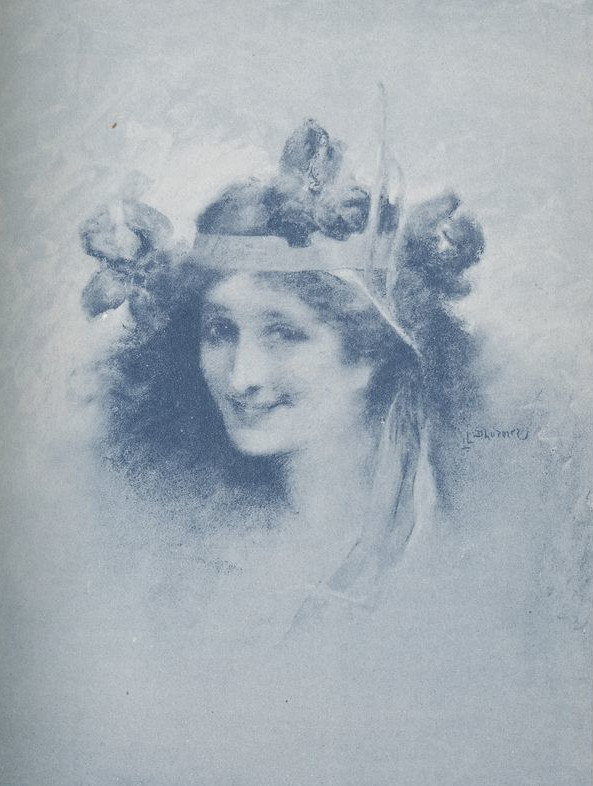
Illustration of Nossis by Lucien Lévy-Dhurmer, from Renée Vivien's Les Kitharèdes

Nossis is not mentioned by later commentators or lexicographers, and does not seem to have entered the Greek literary canon. In the third century BC, Theocritus and Posidippus reference her. She was still known in the first century BC, when Meleager of Gadara included her in his Garland, and in the Augustan period she is one of nine female poets named in an epigram by Antipater of Thessalonica. One of her epigrams is parodied by Cillactor, and two of Herodas' Mimes, the sixth and seventh, refer to her. Marilyn B. Skinner has argued that Herodas' fourth Mime also specifically alludes to the work of Nossis as part of an attack on women poets. Mary Maxwell argues that the style of the Augustan poet Sulpicia imitates the Hellenistic women poets, including Nossis.

At the beginning of the twentieth century, Renée Vivien translated the poems of several ancient Greek women into French in Les Kitharèdes, including Nossis; Tama Lea Engelking argues that Vivien was particularly influenced by Nossis' epigram AP 7.718. The imagist poet H. D. was influenced by Nossis, translating her first epigram as part of the poem "Nossis". Judy Chicago included her in the Heritage Floor, associated with the place-setting for Sappho in The Dinner Party. Modern scholarship on Nossis has primarily been concerned with her relationship to Sappho and her engagement in a women's tradition of Greek poetry.

== Works cited ==
- Balmer, Josephine (2013). Piecing Together the Fragments: Translating Classical Verse, Creating Contemporary Poetry. Oxford University Press. ISBN 978-0-19-958509-0.
- Barnard, Sylvia (1978). "Hellenistic Women Poets". The Classical Journal. 73 (3).
- Bowman, Laurel (1998). "Nossis, Sappho and Hellenistic Poetry". Ramus. 27 (1): 39–59. doi:10.1017/S0048671X00001934.
- Bowman, Laurel (2004). "The 'Women's Tradition' in Greek Poetry". Phoenix. 58 (1). doi:10.2307/4135194. JSTOR 4135194.
- "Nossis". Brooklyn Museum. Archived from the original on 3 June 2023.
- Coughlan, Taylor S. (2020). "The Poetics of Dialect in the Self-Epitaphs of Nossis and Leonidas of Tarentum". Classical Philology. 115 (4): 607–629. doi:10.1086/710798.
- de Vos, Mieke (2014). "From Lesbos She Took Her Honeycomb: Sappho and the 'Female Tradition' in Hellenistic Poetry". In Pieper, Christoph; Ker, James (eds.). Valuing the Past in the Greco-Roman World.
- Engelking, Tama Lea (1992). "Renée Vivien's Sapphic Legacy: Remembering the "House of Muses"". Atlantis. 18.
- Gow, A. S. F.; Page, D. L., eds. (1965). The Greek Anthology: Hellenistic Epigrams. Cambridge University Press.
- Greene, Ellen (2005). "Introduction". In Greene, Ellen (ed.). Women Poets in Ancient Greece and Rome. University of Oklahoma Press. ISBN 9780806136639.
- Hauser, Emily (2023). How Women Became Poets: A Gender History of Greek Literature. Princeton University Press. ISBN 9780691239286.
- Maxwell, Mary (2002). "H.D.: Pound's Sulpicia". Arion: A Journal of Humanities and the Classics. 10 (2): 15–48. JSTOR 20163884.
- Natoli, Bartolo A.; Pitts, Angela; Hallett, Judith P. (2022). Ancient Women Writers of Greece and Rome. Routledge.
- Plant, I.M. (2004). Women Writers of Ancient Greece and Rome: An Anthology. Norman: University of Oklahoma Press.
- Skinner, Marilyn B. (1989). "Sapphic Nossis". Arethusa. 22.
- Skinner, Marilyn B. (2001). "Ladies' Day at the Art Institute: Theocritus, Herodas, and the Gendered Gaze". In Lardinois, André; McClure, Laura (eds.). Making Silence Speak: Women's Voices in Greek Literature and Society. Princeton, N.J.: Princeton University Press.
- Skinner, Marilyn B. (2005). "Nossis Thêlyglôssos: The Private Text and the Public Book". In Greene, Ellen (ed.). Women Poets in Ancient Greece and Rome. University of Oklahoma Press. ISBN 9780806136639.
- Snyder, Jane McIntosh (1991). The Women and the Lyre. Carbondale: Southern Illinois University Press.
