= Epizephyrian Locris =

Ancient city on the Ionian Sea

Coordinates: 38°12′39″N 16°14′25″E

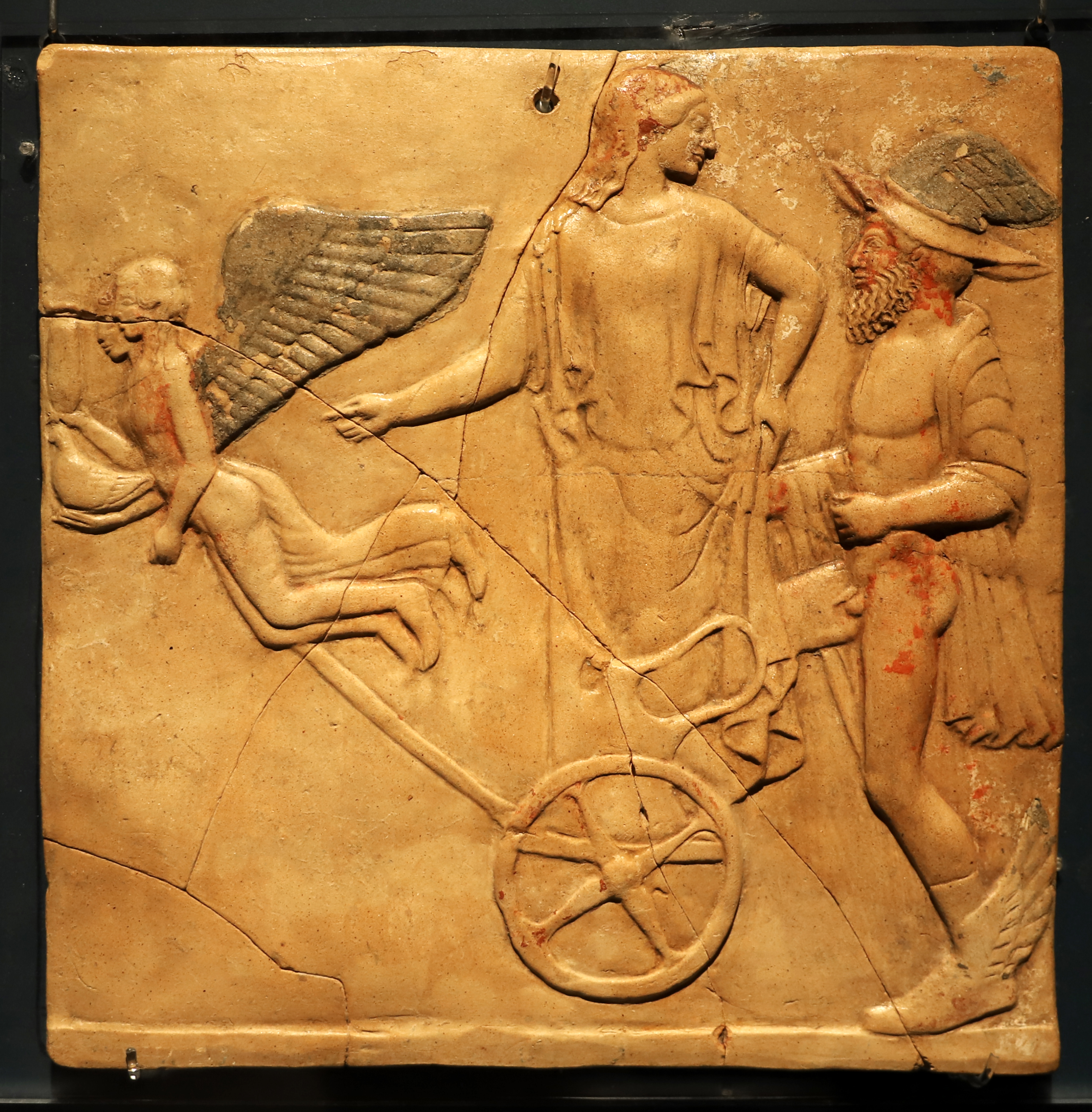
Pinax of Hermes and Aphrodite, 470–460 BC

Epizephyrian Locris (Ancient Greek: Λοκροὶ Ἐπιζεφύριοι, romanized: Lokroì Epizephúrioi, lit. 'Western Locrians'), also known as Locri Epizephyrii or simply Locri, was an ancient Greek city in Southern Italy, located in Calabria on the Ionian Sea. The city was established as a Greek colony at the beginning of the 7th century BC by settlers from Locris in central Greece. The modern town of Locri derives its name from this ancient settlement.

The city was a center of Magna Graecia during the Classical and Hellenistic periods. Locri was home to athletes who achieved distinction in the Panhellenic Games.

Ancient authors who referred to Locri include Strabo, Pausanias, Eusebius of Caesarea, Plutarch, Polybius, and Diodorus Siculus. Additional references to the city were identified in documents discovered at Olympia, Greece in 2018.

== Site location ==
The Locri Epizephyrii archaeological site is in Mandorleto, a frazione of the modern town of Locri, approximately 3 km southwest of the town centre. It is located between the Portigliola and Gerace rivers, between the Ionian Sea and the hills of Castellace, Abbadessa, and Manella.

== History ==
=== Foundation ===
Ancient Greek colonies and their dialect groupings in Magna Graecia.

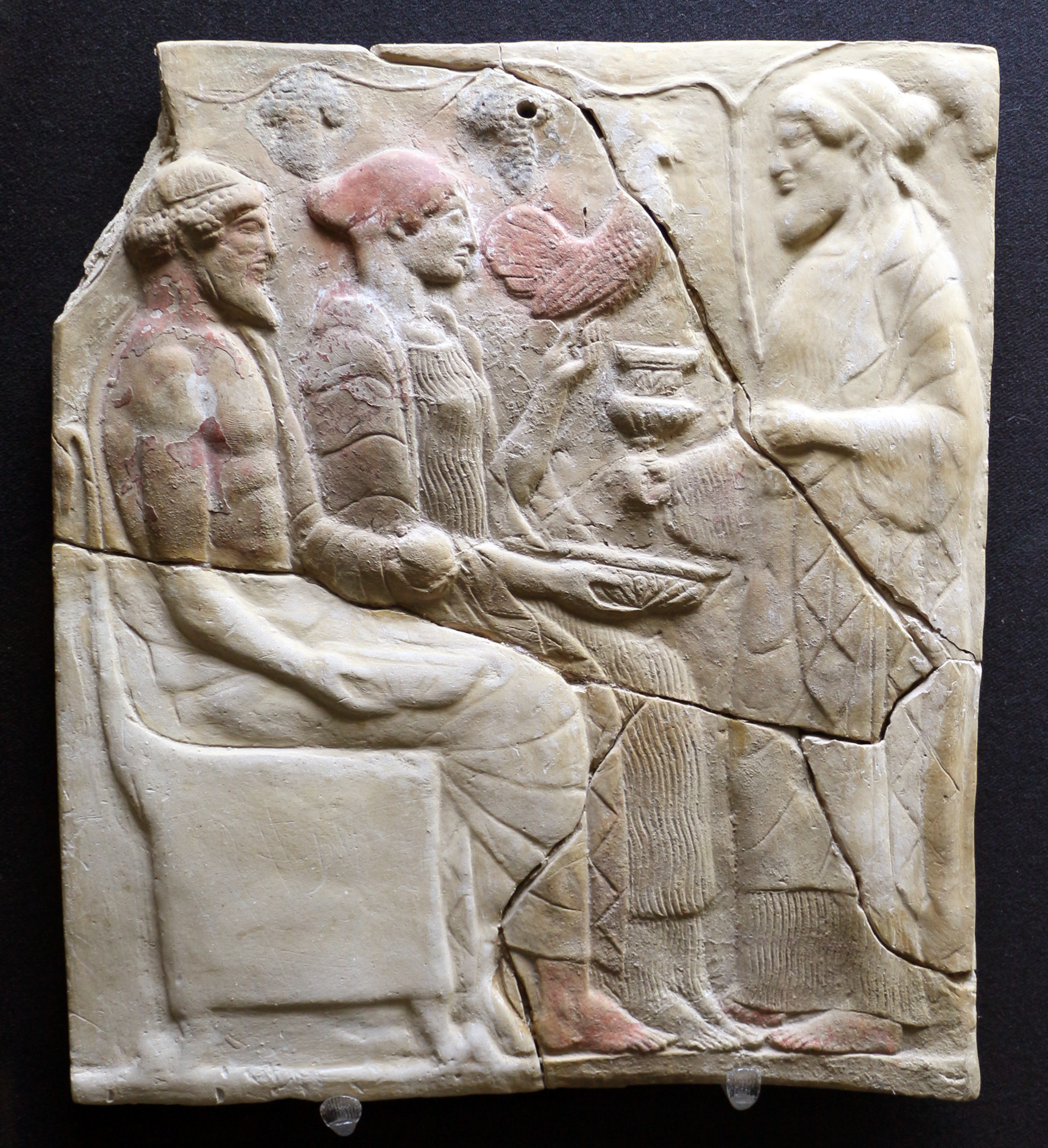
Pinax from Locri with offering of Dionysus to Hades and Persephone (Reggio Museum).

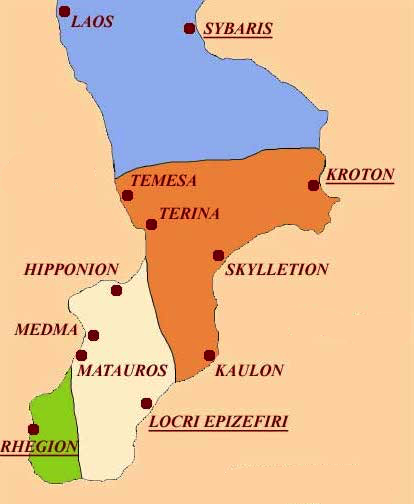
Greek City-states (underlined) of Calabria c. 6th century BC.

Locri was the last of the Greek colonies founded in Calabria, following a wave of colonization by Achaeans from the Ionian coast (Metapontion, Poseidonia, Sybaris, Kroton) shortly before 720 BC. The first settlement was founded near Cape Zefirio (the current Cape Bruzzano).

Later, the colonists moved north, close to the Epopis hill, where they founded a city named "Epizephyrioi". The indigenous populations of the Sicels were driven out.

==== Disputes in origin ====
Scholars hold contrasting views of the colonists' origins. Some argue that they might have come from Opuntian Locris, while others believe they originated in Ozolian Locris in whole or in part. Many believe that the settlers were Helots. The dispute is based on different ancient sources.

=== Government and organisation ===
Locri functioned under a political model similar to that of Locris. A conservative militarist aristocracy exercised power through the so-called "Assembly of a Thousand", which was probably composed of citizens enjoying full political rights. The population was organised into three tribes and thirty-six phratries.

The Epizephyrian Locris legal system was based on the legislation of Zaleucus, c. 660 BC and used a written, codified set of laws.

The system used the law of retaliation (Latin: lex talionis), imposing specific penalties for each crime committed in an attempt to prevent serial family feuds and private vengeance, which was customary at the time. The system also placed a much higher value on the role and social prestige of women within Epizephyrian Locrian society. This is seen in their role in the city's cults and their right to perpetuate inheritance and the name of a family over time, even in the absence of male heirs. The nobility also used matrilineality to trace its lineage.

In 7th century BC, the development of the city was underway, expanding from the hills onto the plain closer to the sea, based on an organized urban plan. Its sanctuaries and cults became well-known across the Greek world, particularly two sanctuary estates: one dedicated to Persephone (who was worshipped as the protector of fertile marriage, a role typically associated with Hera), and one to Aphrodite.

=== Expansion ===
The city's stability led to an expansion of control over the territory through the establishment of sub-colonies. This was driven by a desire for greater control of the area and a need to counter the threat of expansion of their enemy in Kroton. This was made possible by the city's notable demographic growth, which risked disrupting the existing fragile balance. Thus, it extended its control from the Ionian coast to the Tyrrhenian side of present-day Calabria; founding the two colonies of Medma (today Rosarno) and Hipponion (modern-day Vibo Valentia) between 650 and 600 BC. This was likely built on existing settlements, occupying Metauros (modern-day Gioia Tauro), previously established as a colony of Zancle (Messina) or Rhegion (Reggio Calabria).

=== War with Kroton ===
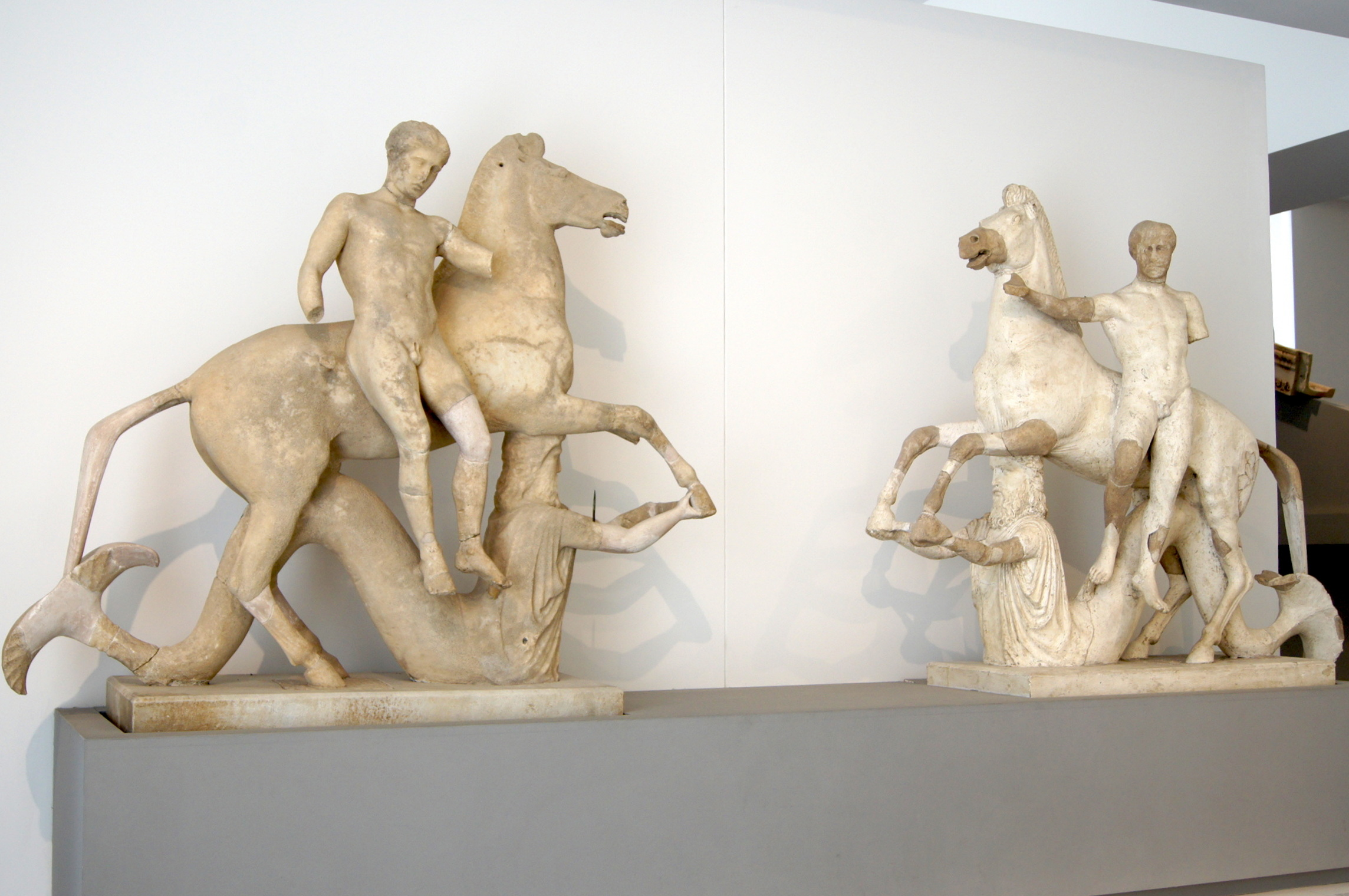
The Dioscuri, sanctuary of Marasà, 450–400 BC (Reggio museum).

At the Battle of the Sagra (560–550 BC), Locri emerged victorious, halting Kroton's territorial expansions, and establishing Locri as a new power in the region. Following this victory, the cult of the Dioscuri began to be observed in both Rhegion and Locri. During excavations of the Ionic temple of Marasà in Locri Epizephyrii, two marble acroteria statues were found, which may represent the twin sons of Zeus; these are now housed in the National Museum of Magna Graecia, Reggio.

Locri expanded its control further north than ever before. It incorporated Kaulon, and likely Skylletion on the Ionian coast, as well as probably Terina, and Temesa on the Tyrrhenian coast, thereby gaining control over the territory between the Gulfs of Squillace and Sant’Eufemia. This led to a period of significant prosperity in the second half of the 6th century BC.

=== Alliance with Syracuse ===
Locri established alliances with the Deinomenids (485–465 BC) of Syracuse and later with Dionysius I and his son Dionysius II. In 477 BC, Anaxilas of Rhegion (modern day Reggio Calabria) prepared to attack Locri. Locri turned to Hieron I of Syracuse for help and successfully dissuaded Anaxilas.

The 4th century BC was a period of artistic, economic, and cultural splendor for Locri. Inhabitants of note included the poet Nossis and the philosophers Echecrates, Timaeus, and Acrion, founders of a flourishing Pythagorean school (introduced to Locri at the time of Dionysius I). Plato visited Locri.

=== Roman conquest ===
The weakness of Syracuse left the Greek cities of southern Italy particularly vulnerable, as they were unprepared for the threat of the Bruttii, Samnites, and Lucanians. Fearing for their survival and distrusting the Italiote League, the Greek cities asked for help from Rome, which exploited this opportunity to extend its control southward by sending military garrisons. Locri received such a Roman garrison before 282 BC.

In 280 BC, Pyrrhus invaded southern Italy to honour an alliance with Tarentum from the earlier Roman-Semite war. The shifting balance of power led Locri to ally with Pyrrhus, expelling the Roman garrison in protest of its dependence on Rome. However, the failure of Pyrrhus’s campaign, coupled with the growing unpopularity of his rule due to increasingly tyrannical behaviour, led Locri to surrender once again to Rome in 277 BC.

In 272 BC, Rome established a new garrison in Locri and, in return for their military support, made only moderate demands from the cities of Magna Graecia—exempting them from providing men for the legions and only requesting the supply of ships when needed. Therefore, Locri became a socia navalis of Rome, remaining independent, while retaining its Greek characteristics, and continuing to mint its own money. In 264 BC, Locri provided several transport ships for Rome in the First Punic War, honouring their treaty.

=== Second Punic War ===
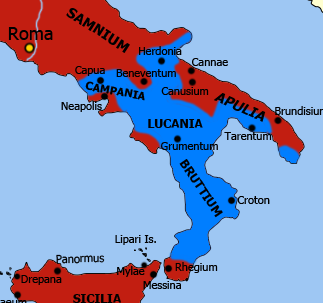
The maximum extent of Carthaginian control c. 213 BC (blue).

After the defeat of the Romans at Cannae (216 BC), Locri sided with the Carthaginians, swayed by Hannibal's promises of freedom and independence. Hannibal's priority was to conquer an outlet to the sea in Bruttium and, in the winter of 216/215 BC after abandoning plans to capture Rhegium, ordered Hanno to seize Locri.

Hanno sent cavalry forward under Hamilcar to capture the population outside the city walls, and thus a large number of prisoners were used to secure the unconditional surrender of the city. At the same time, the Locrians secretly allowed the Roman garrison, commanded by Lucius Atilius, to board ships to escape the city and go to Rhegium. Locri was thus granted significant autonomy, maintaining the port under its control, and being able to govern itself provided that it supported the Carthaginian forces.

The cities of southern Italy were gradually retaken by the Romans and, after the Battle of the Metaurus, Locri was the last great city still in the hands of Hannibal. However, the army sent in 208 BC to support a naval expedition to recover Locri, led by Lucius Cincius Alimentus, was annihilated near Petelia. The two Roman consuls, Marcellus and Titus Quinctius Crispinus, were killed near the Carthaginian camps. The naval expedition reached Locri, and besieged it, but fled on the arrival of Hannibal.

In 205 BC, the consul Scipio Africanus devised another plan to reconquer Locri when some inhabitants of Locri fell into the hands of the Romans. Having been informed that a large portion of the population could no longer endure the Carthaginian occupation (an account corroborated by Locrian exiles residing in Rhegium), Scipio returned the prisoners to Locri. Once within the city walls, they conspired to eliminate the Carthaginian garrison during the night and admitted 3,000 Roman soldiers into the lower quarter of the city. The Carthaginian forces, taken by surprise, retreated to the citadel where prolonged skirmishes broke out between the opposing garrisons within the city. Hannibal immediately marched his army toward Locri, and was on the verge of reaching it when the Locrians joined forces with the Romans on the battlefield, decisively altering the course of the conflict.

=== Aftermath ===
Control of the city fell to Quintus Pleminius, and the military tribunes Marcus Sergius and Publius Mazienus. Pleminius took advantage of the ongoing war to commit atrocities, violence and theft on the Locrian population. He also orchestrated the sacking of the sanctuary of Persephone (as Pyrrhus had done decades earlier). There are different versions of what happened next, but the discontent resulted in increasingly frequent clashes between factions within the garrison.

Pleminius had the military tribunes beaten, whose supporters pounced on Pleminius, seriously wounding him. Pleminius retaliated in turn by having Sergius and Matienus tortured, and finally killed. Scipio returned to restore order and arrested Pleminius. Eventually, on direct appeal of the Locrians, the Senate had Pleminius sent to Rome (where he soon died in prison), restored the losses of the treasury of Persephone from public funds, and made the Roman soldiers return their loot while the Locrians were given their freedom.

In 204 BC, the restoration of the foedus amicitiae and the extensive autonomy that Rome granted it, allowed Locria to keep its ancient laws and customs. But the vicissitudes of the 3rd century BC caused a notable depression of the city. Large areas of the city were abandoned (e.g. the Centocamere area), and agricultural settlements began to be developed in the surrounding areas.

=== Further Romanisation ===
Around the end of the 3rd or beginning of the 2nd century BC, another desecration of the Persephoneion by the Bruttii prompted a new and decisive intervention by the Roman Senate in favor of Locri. This response was motivated by Rome’s desire to honour its oath of loyalty, mutual aid with Locri, and by the Senate's interpretation of the temple desecration as a bad omen. As a result, Quintus Minucius conducted swift investigations, which soon led to the capture of the culprits and the restitution of the funds stolen from the temple treasury.

Following this, Locri was called upon to fulfill its military obligations as civitas foederata to provide triremes for the Roman fleet in 191 BC during the war against Antiochus III the Great, and again in 171 BC during the conflict against Perseus of Macedonia. But the economic crisis in Locri left the city unable to provide the ships required in 156 BC against the Dalmatians in the Iberian Peninsula. In this case, it was the historian Polybius, who enjoyed great favor in Rome, who intervened to exempt Locri from sanctions.

=== Imperial era ===
Locri remained an important centre known by personalities such as Cicero, but its importance was more local: confined to a provincial area that was increasingly distant from Roman political interests, and the great economic traffic of the empire. It therefore became a smaller administrative centre, but numerous other agricultural centres, and opulent villas developed, which took over from the city from an economic and residential point of view.

== Architecture ==
Archaeological excavations conducted by Orsi (1908–1912), Arias (1940–1941), and Jacopi (1951) showed that the town was laid out on a rectangular plan organised around a broad main street. This street, which still preserves the Greek name dromo (from dromos), marked the point at which the city rose into the surrounding hills.

The discovery of important inscriptions halfway up Mannella Hill, related to the city's later administration, suggests the agora was located at its base.

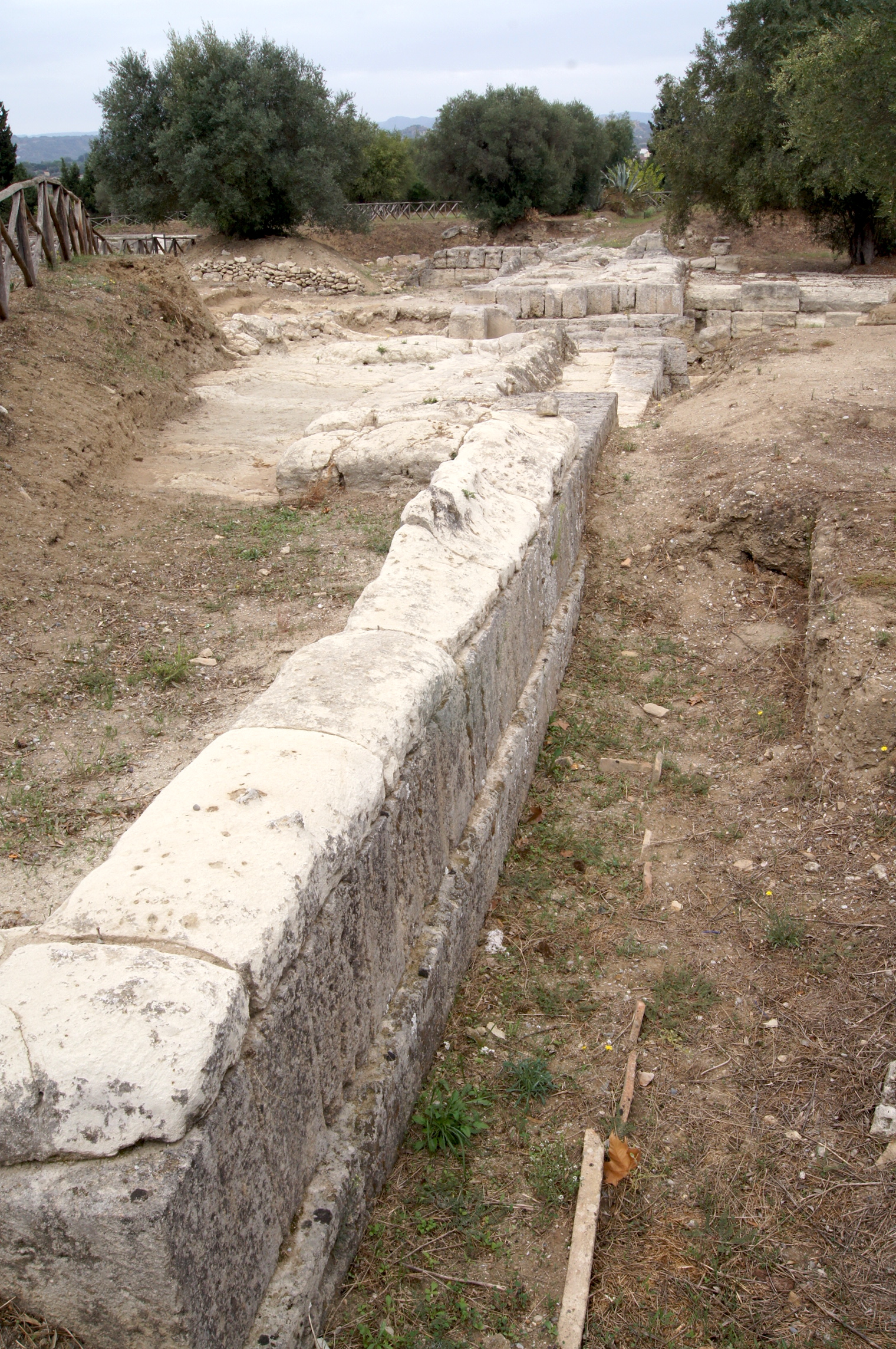
Northeastern Wall

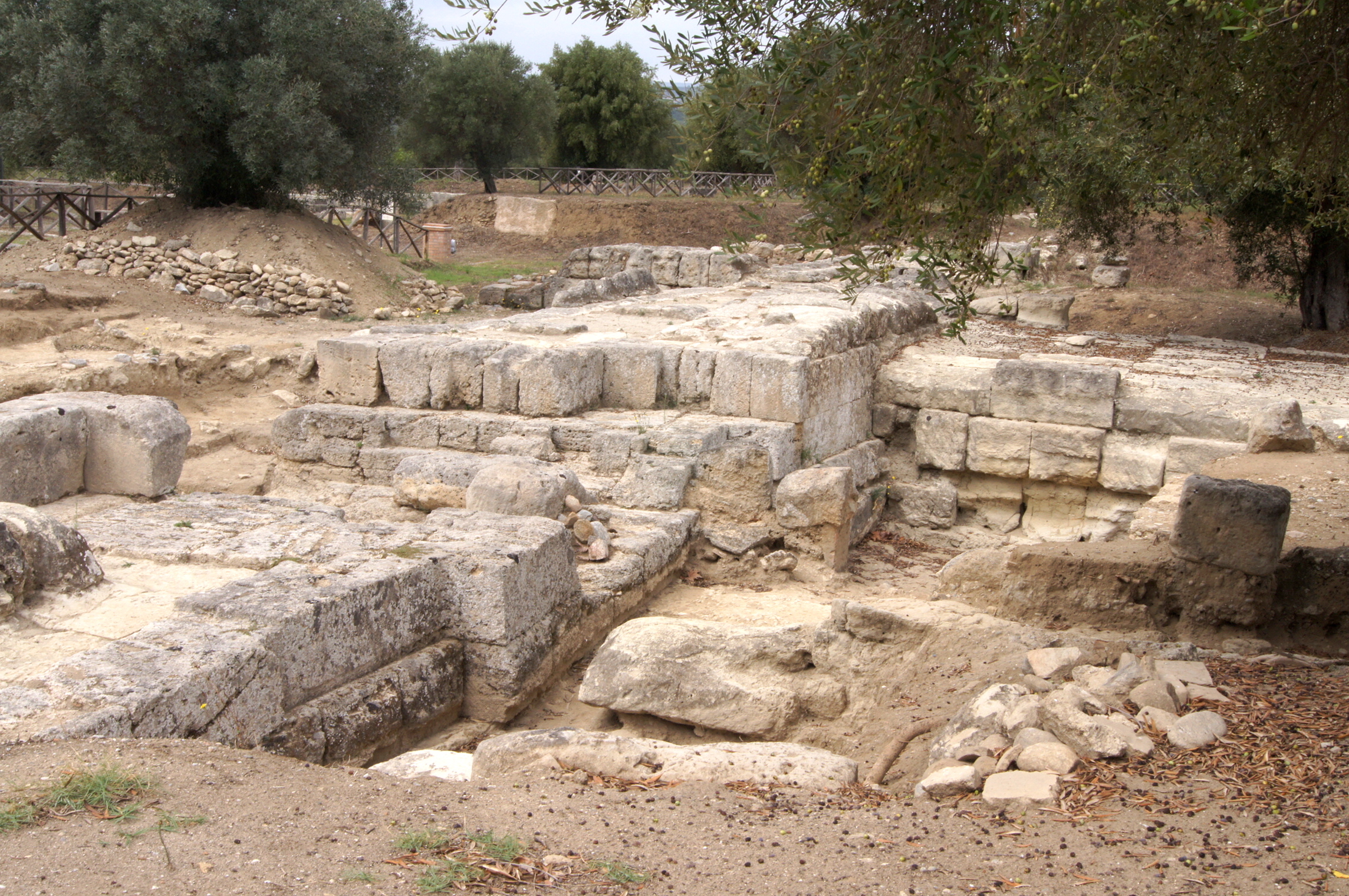
Parapezza Gate

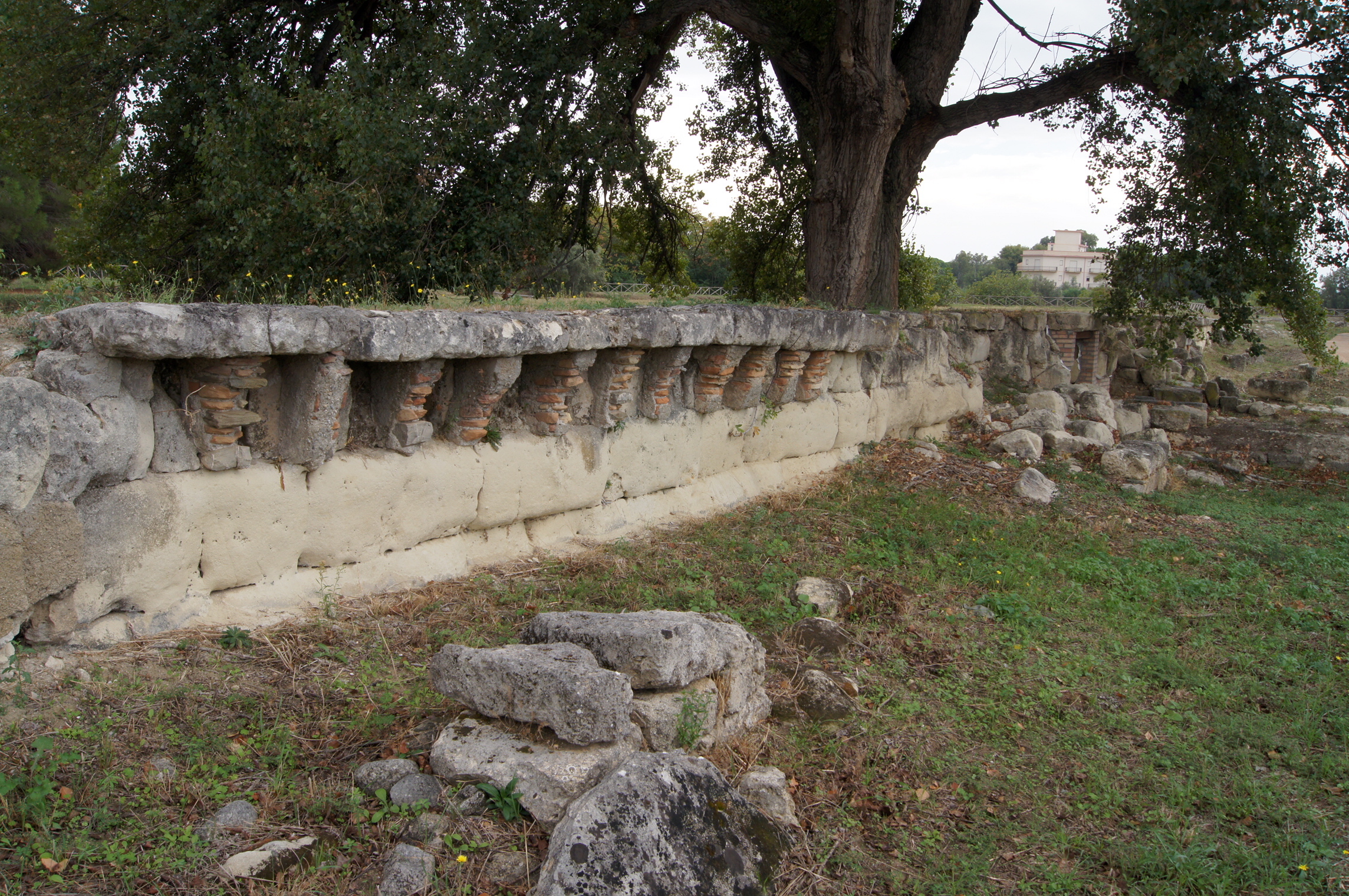
Southwestern Wall

== Theatre ==
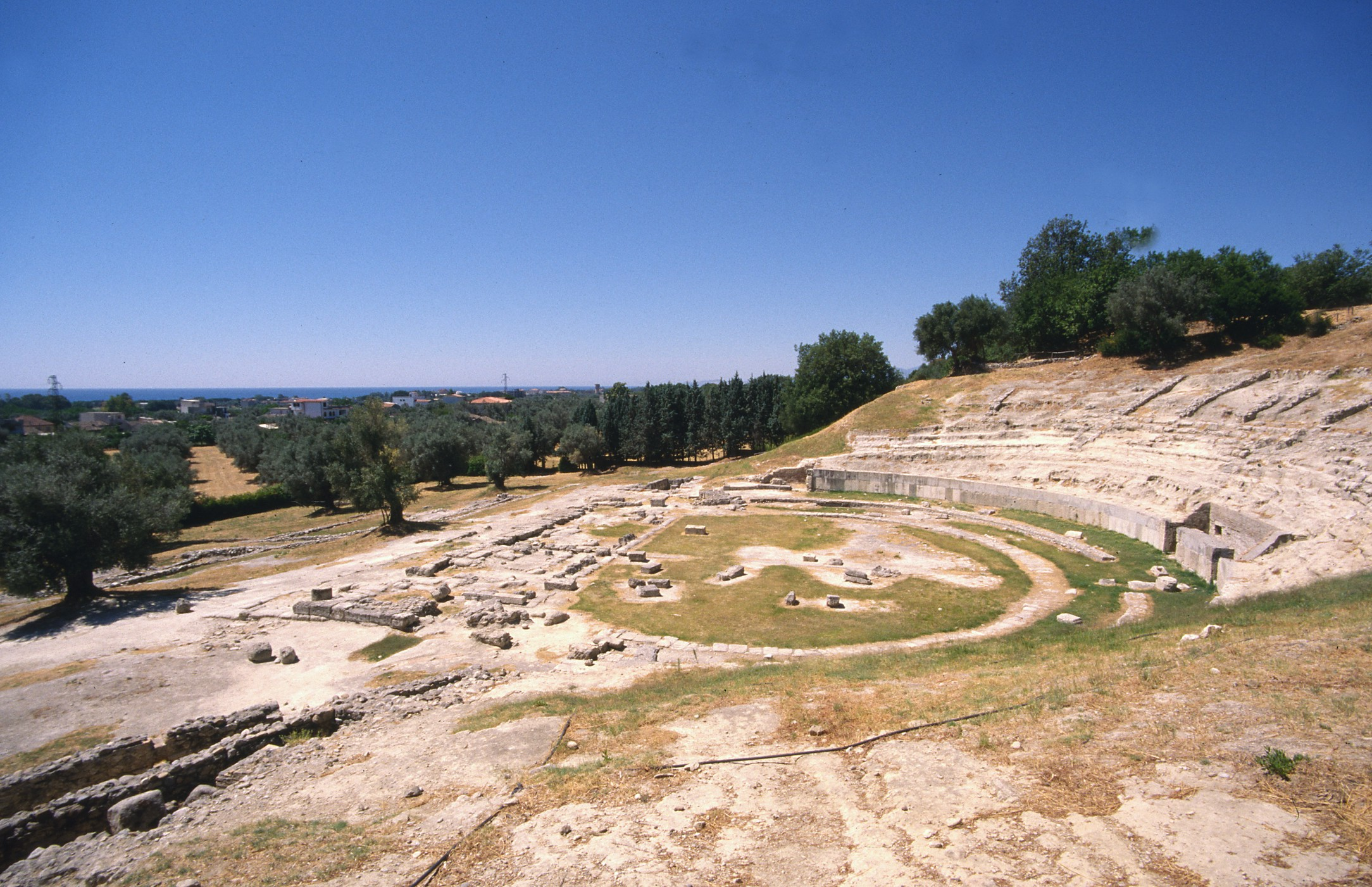
Theatre

The Theatre held up to 4,500 spectators and is located in the Pirettina area. It exploits a natural concavity at the foot of the Casa Marafioti hill below the Cusemi plateau, and was excavated by cutting steps in the soft sandstone and partly arranged with slabs of the same sandstone. It was rebuilt in the 1st century BC on the original Greek layout from the 4th century BC. Numerous alterations were made over time.

It was brought to light in 1940 and excavations were completed in 1957.

== Sanctuaries and temples ==
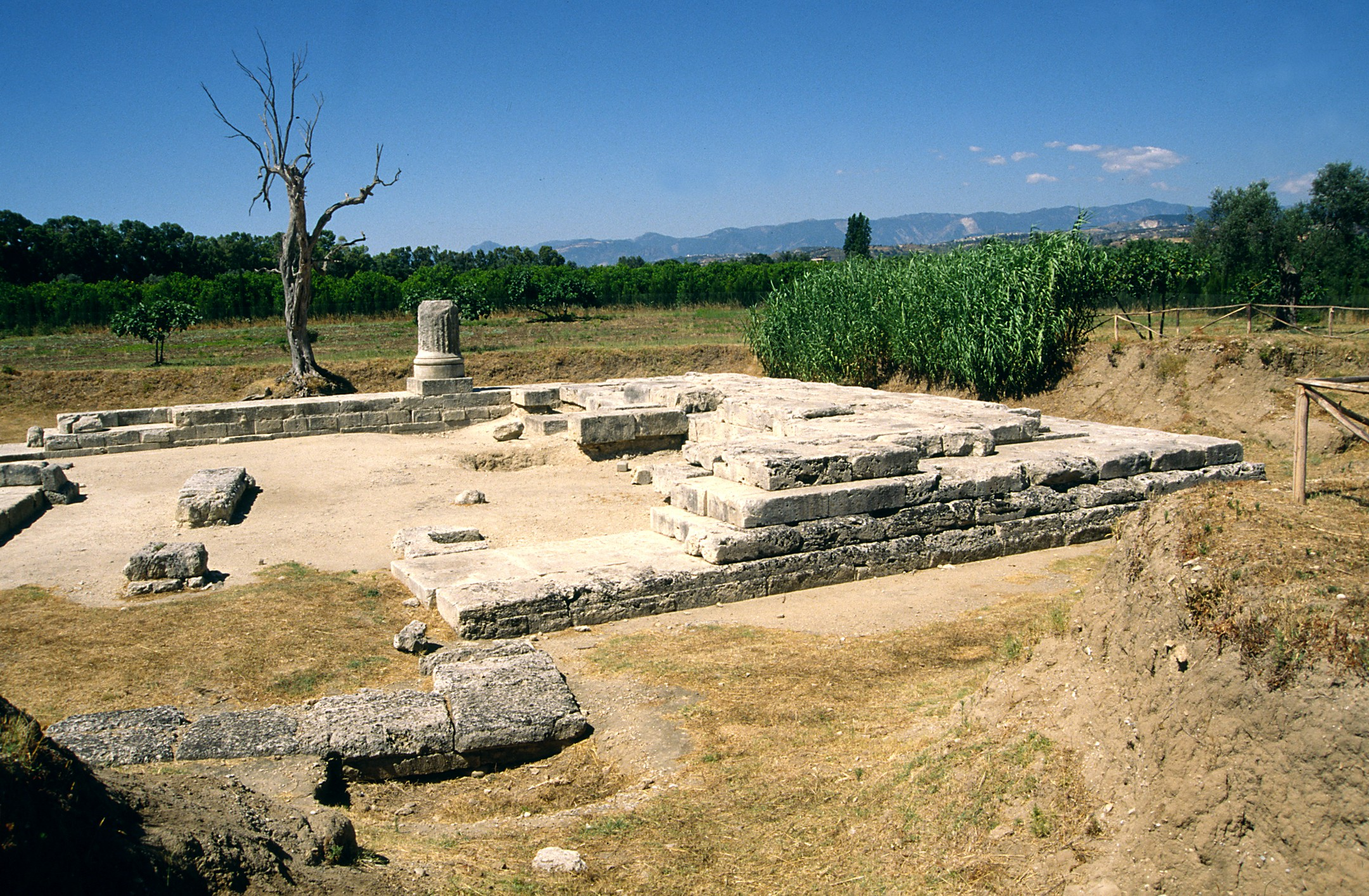
Temple of Marasa

There were numerous sanctuaries, sometimes with significant temples, especially inside the walls and dating to the archaic period. Those located immediately outside the walls, but without monuments, were assumed to be no less important by virtue of the abundant votive offerings.

Sanctuaries outside the city walls include those of Aphrodite, Persephone, the nymphs in Contrada Caruso, and Demeter in Contrada Paparezza.

The sanctuary of Grotta Caruso, or Grotto of the Nymphs, was a cave with a spring where the nymphs were worshipped from the 6th century BC.

A sanctuary to Athena was built on the Mannella hill within the city, likely from the 6th century BC.

=== The sanctuary of Demeter ===
The sanctuary of Demeter Thesmophoros, which was located immediately outside the northeast corner of the walls, faced the gate, and covered about 3000 m^{2}. Demeter, mother of Persephone, was a goddess linked with the cycle of agriculture. She was venerated here as Thesmophorus (thesmos = law; phoros = bearer), protectress of both marriage and the rites of passage from girlhood to adulthood. The sanctuary was located where the city met the countryside, with a dual purpose of protecting the city through both female and soil fertility, and with a political function for the cohesion of the social group, and the respect of the laws.

=== The temple of Adonis and House of Lions ===
The small temple or sacellum was built in 500–480 BC in the Centocamere area just outside the walls, but on a different alignment to them. Private worship of Adonis took place in the Athenian 'style' led by a female thiasos. The poet Nossis, one of the best preserved Greek women poets, wrote about this Locrian cult around 310 BC, as she was perhaps part of one of the female thiasoi who honoured the goddess.

=== Sanctuary of Aphrodite ===
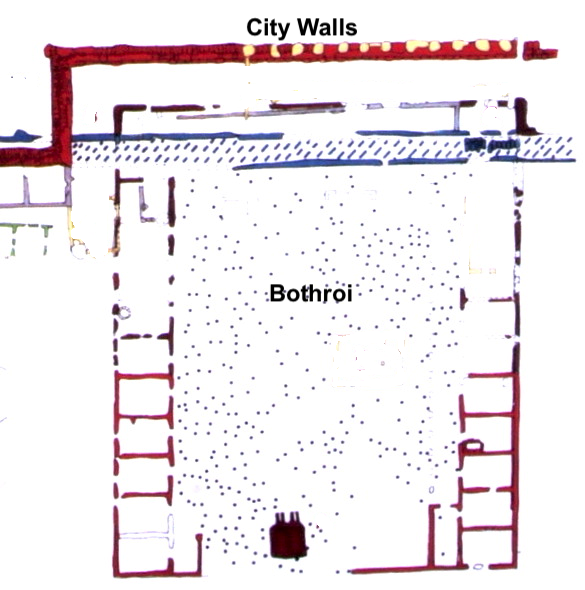
Sanctuary of Aphrodite (Locri)

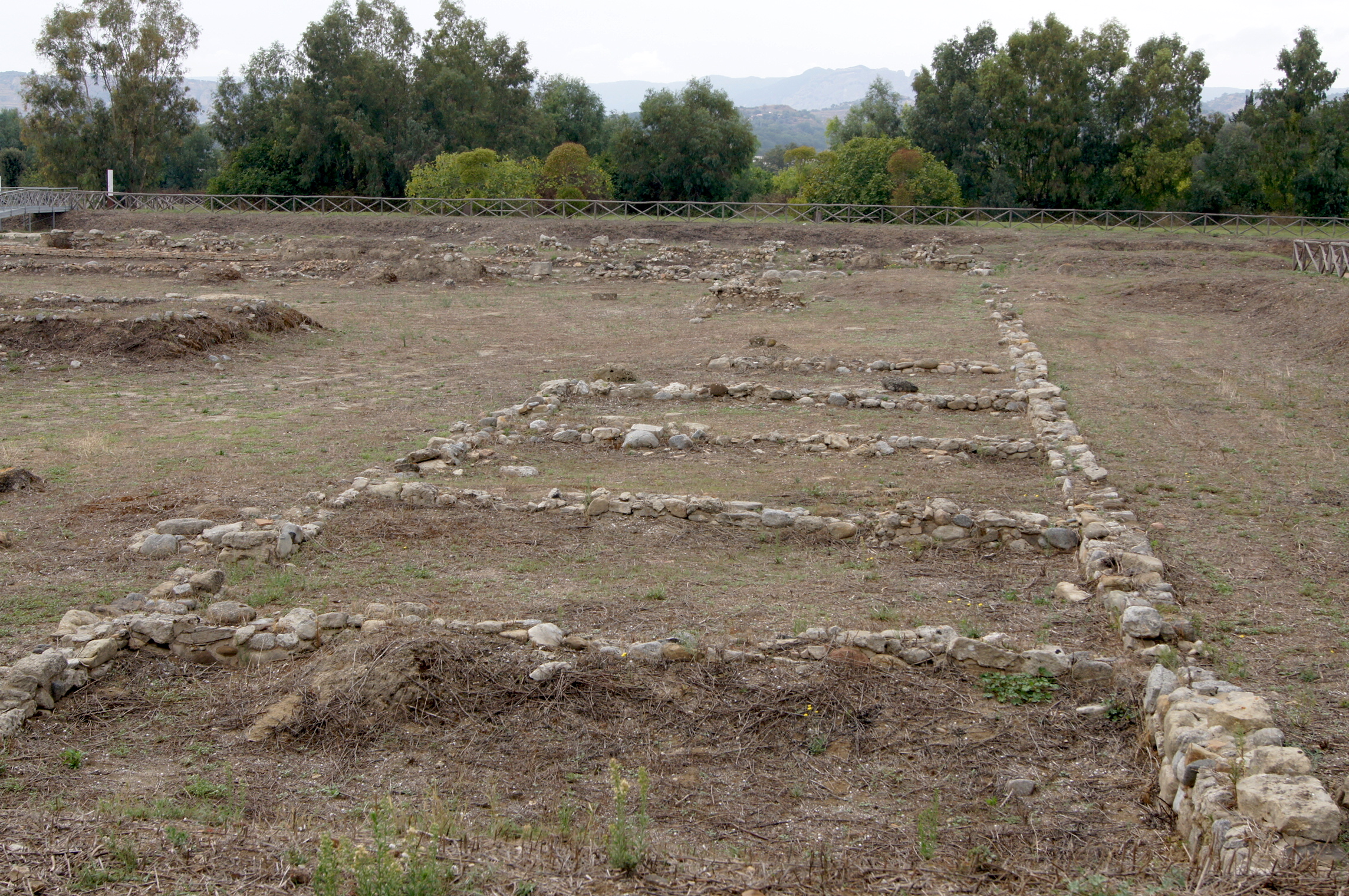
Sanctuary of Aphrodite

The sanctuary of Aphrodite is also located in the Centocamere area in south Marasà, just outside the walls near the southeastern gate and near the sanctuary of Adonis. It was in the form of a "U"-shaped stoa, and a central courtyard built in two stages in the 7th century and middle of the 6th century BC, and used until the middle of the 4th century BC.

It was an imposing structure, with a series of six rooms (oikoi, 7 x 5 m), later divided into eleven, on each side of the courtyard of 55 x 66 m. Curiosity has been raised as to their use; one possibility is that travelling worshippers used them as lodgings, and to celebrate sacrificial rituals at sacred banquets as in a hestiatoreion such as at the Temple of Juno Lacinia (Crotone).

The residues of the sacrifice would then have been buried in a pit dug in front of each particular room. During religious banquets celebrated here, young girls from the poorer classes could have been required to furnish certain services.

Around 371 bothroi (pits) were found in the U-shaped stoa with remains of meals, evidently intended for the celebration of sacred banquets, with terracotta statuettes and dedications to Aphrodite. Among the sacrificial animal bones, apart from bulls' and pigs', there were also dog remains. Amongst the pottery there was a black varnish vase engraved with the name of Cybele, proof that this Eastern mother goddess had reached Locri prior to being incorporated into the worship of Aphrodite. The sacred banquet ritual consumed in the oikoi is echoed in the numerous recumbent statuettes reclining on a kline. In their hands, they hold symbolic objects like a patera (a shallow dish for pouring liquids during the sacred rituals).

=== Sanctuary of Persephone at Manella ===
The Sanctuary of Persephone (queen of the underworld) was located outside the city walls on a narrow terrace in the valley between hills of Mannella and Abbadessa. It was described in Roman times by Diodorus Siculus as "the most famous of the sanctuaries of southern Italy" (but he excluded Sicily). The riches of the temple were often the object of the appetites of foreign sovereigns or common criminals and were plundered by Dionysius II (360 BC), Pyrrhus (276 BC) and by the Roman commander Pleminius, Scipio's lieutenant after his expulsion from Locri during the Second Punic War (205 BC). The votive objects found in the complex (figured terracotta, fragments of vases, pinakes, mirrors and inscriptions dedicated to the goddess) indicate the temple's use was between the 7th and 2nd centuries BC.

It had impressive terrace retaining walls that probably also marked the boundaries of the sanctuary area or temenos. Within was a building around a square pit that was interpreted as a treasury. The sanctuary had no large temple, but the retaining walls defined a narrow, and dimly-lit path to the consecrated area that gave the ancient visitor a feeling of being in a sacred place.

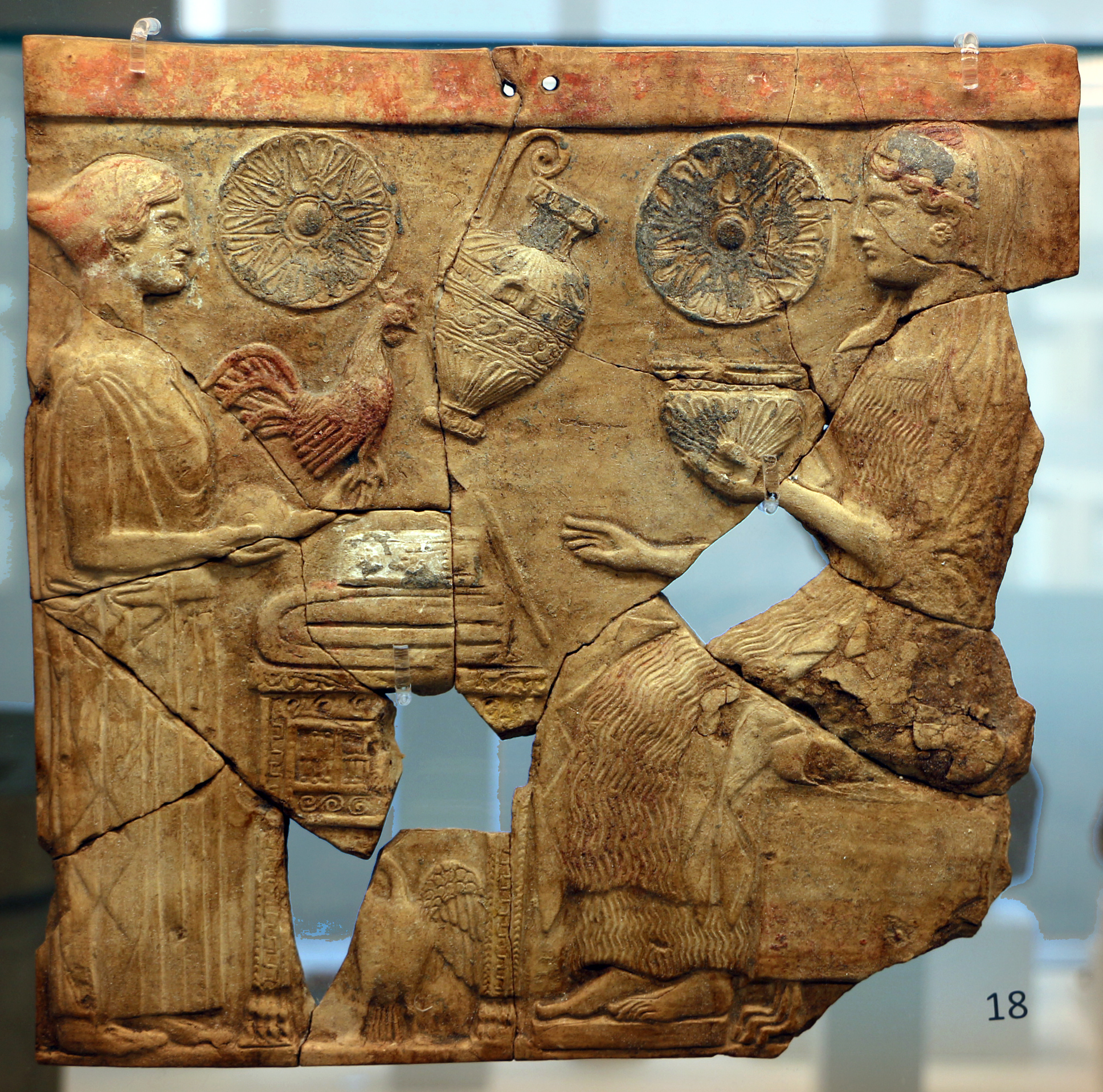
Pinax with goddess receiving homage from a girl to be married (Reggio museum).

=== Temple of Marasà ===
The archaic wooden-framed temple from c. 7th century BC was remodelled several times until the end of c. 6th century BC, when it was demolished and buried in a large pit inside the city walls.

A new temple was built by Syracusan architects in 470 BC on the initiative of the tyrant Hieron of Syracuse (ally and protector of the Locrians). The new temple was larger, in Ionic style, made of limestone and has the same location, but is oriented differently. This temple was much taller than the Doric temples nearby (height to width ratio 1:1), and is one of the few Ionic temples of Magna Graecia. Its monumental size made it visible all over the city and out to sea. Its refined decoration also symbolised the power Locri had accrued.

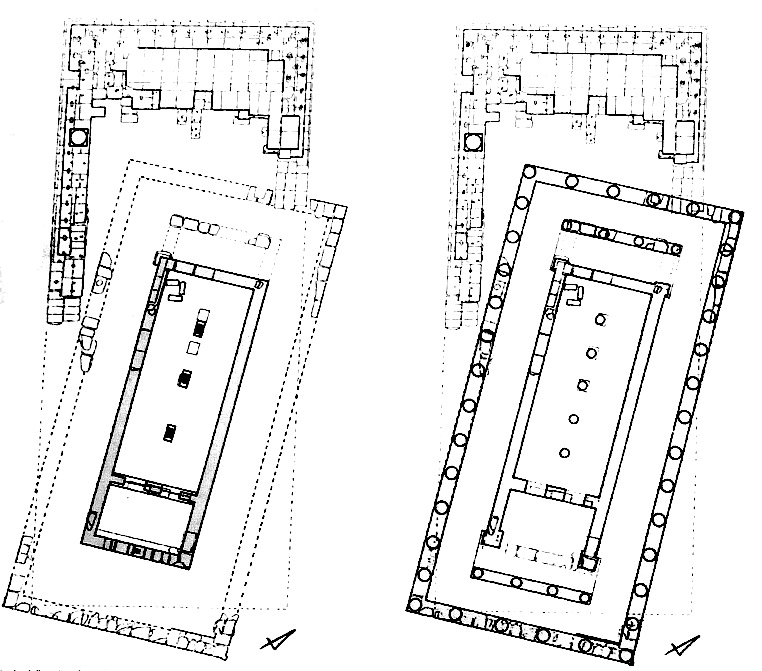
Plan of 2 phases of archaic temple of Marasà c. 7th–6th century BC.

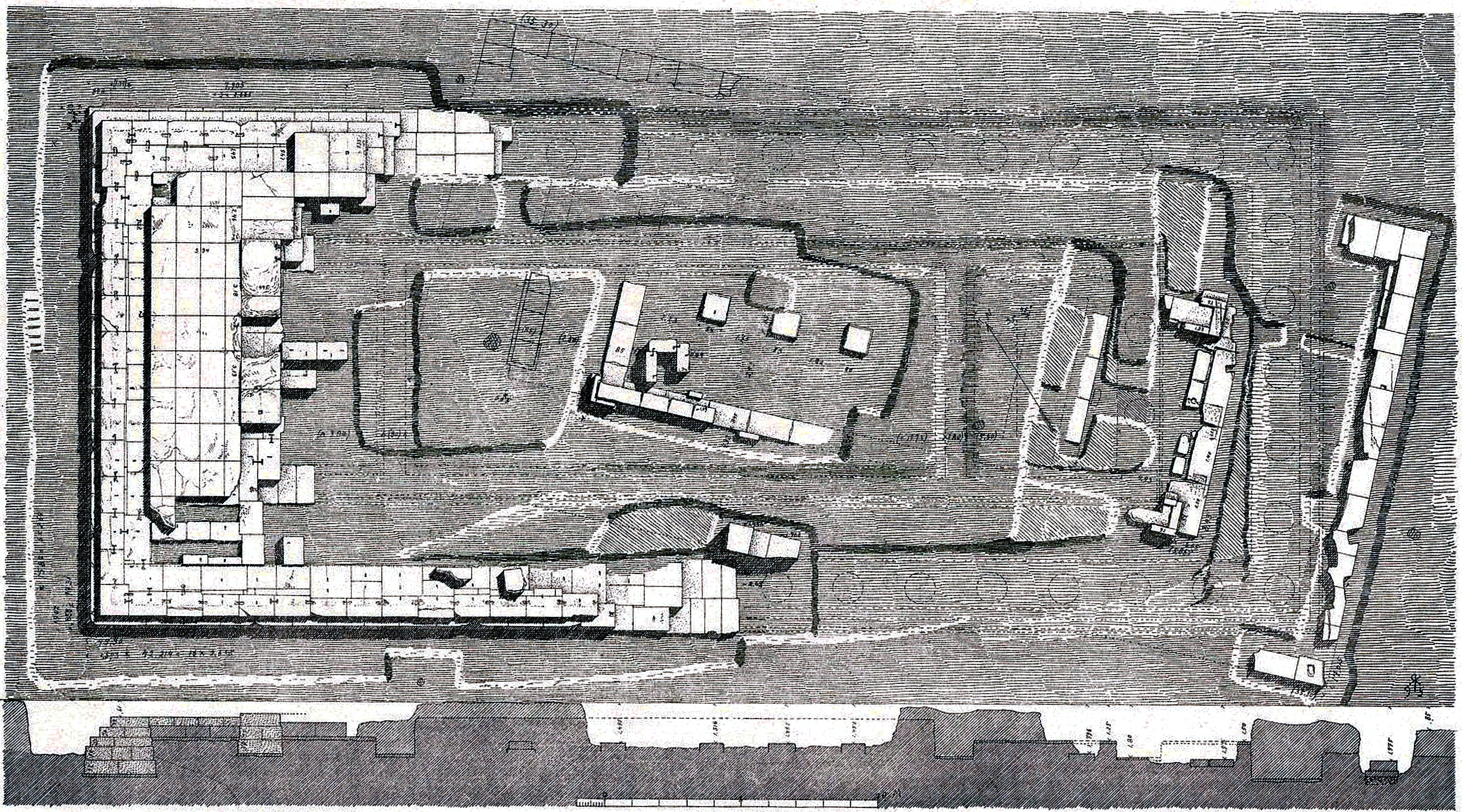
Ionic temple c. 5th century BC, with earlier c. 7th–6th century BC below.

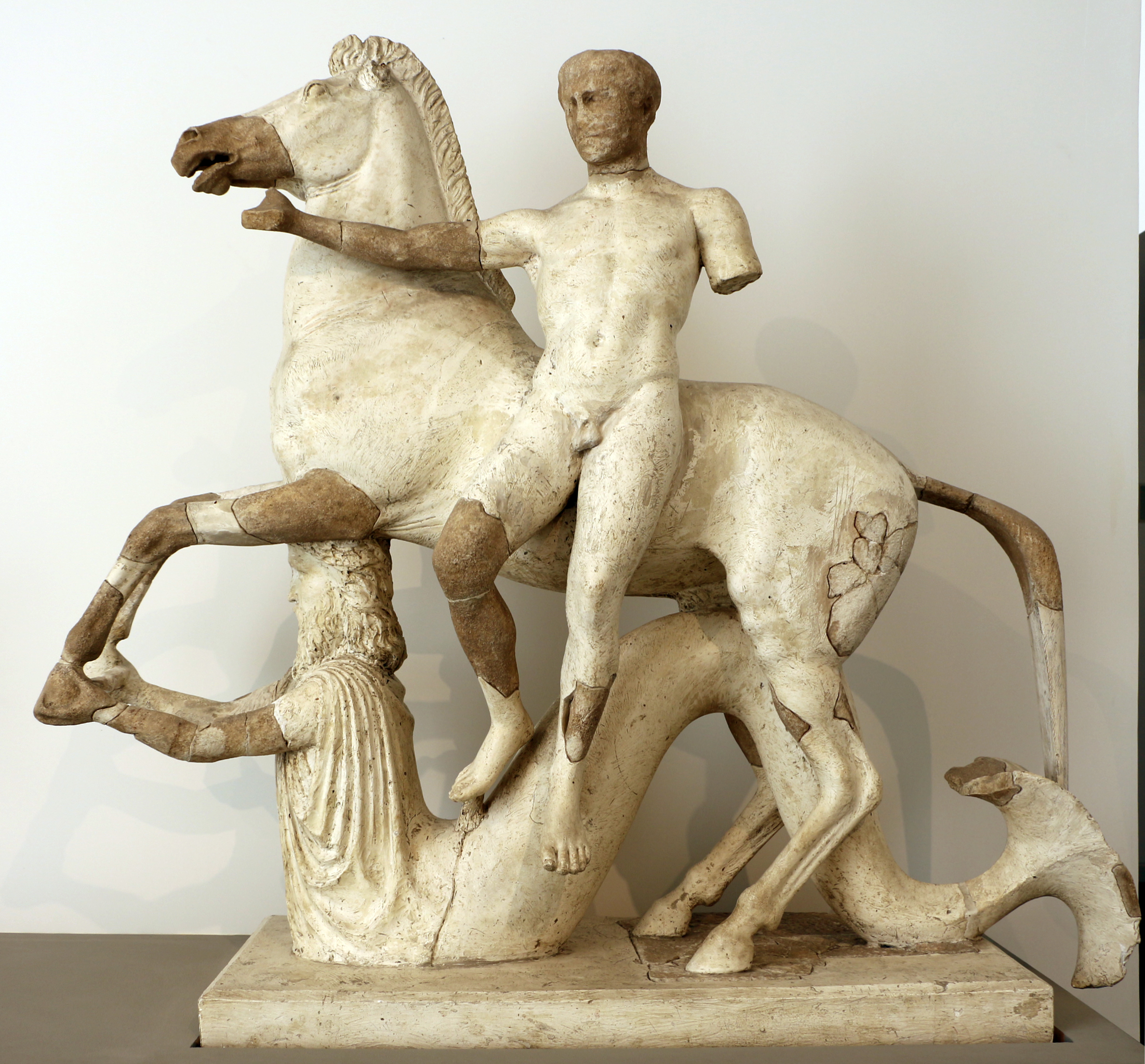
Dioscuro pediment 450–400 BC (Reggio museum).

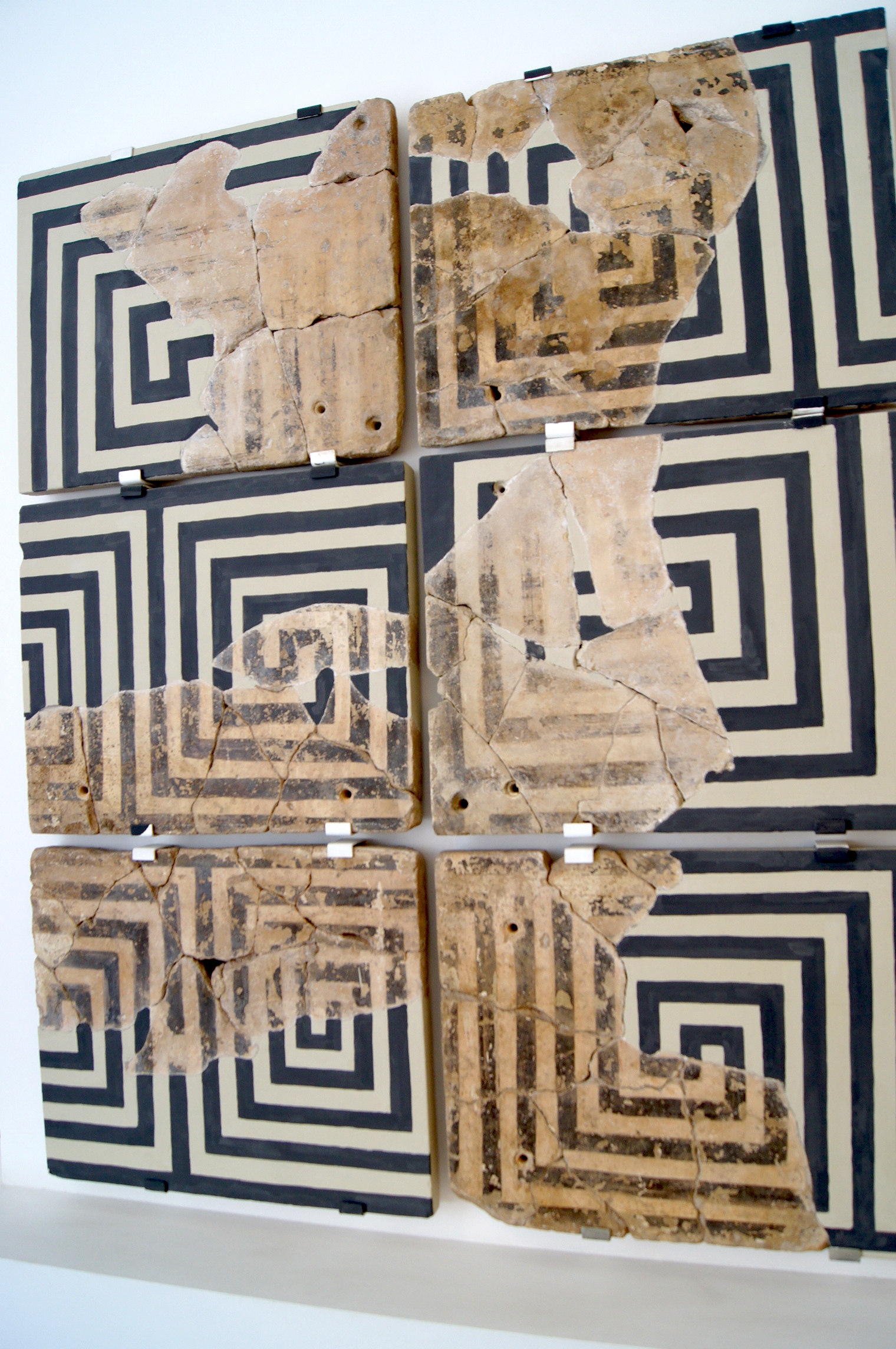
From the walls of the cella. The 1st phase of the temple.

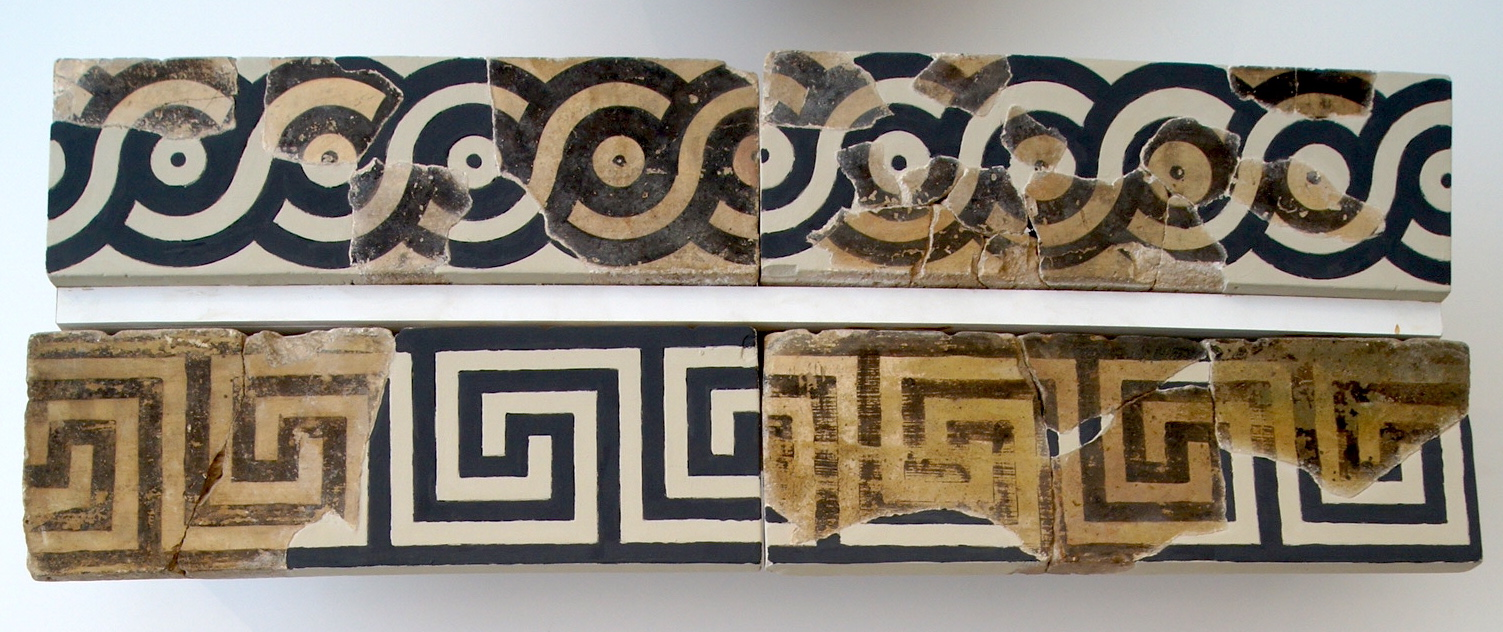
The 1st phase of temple. Terracotta tiles covering the wooden framework (Reggio museum).

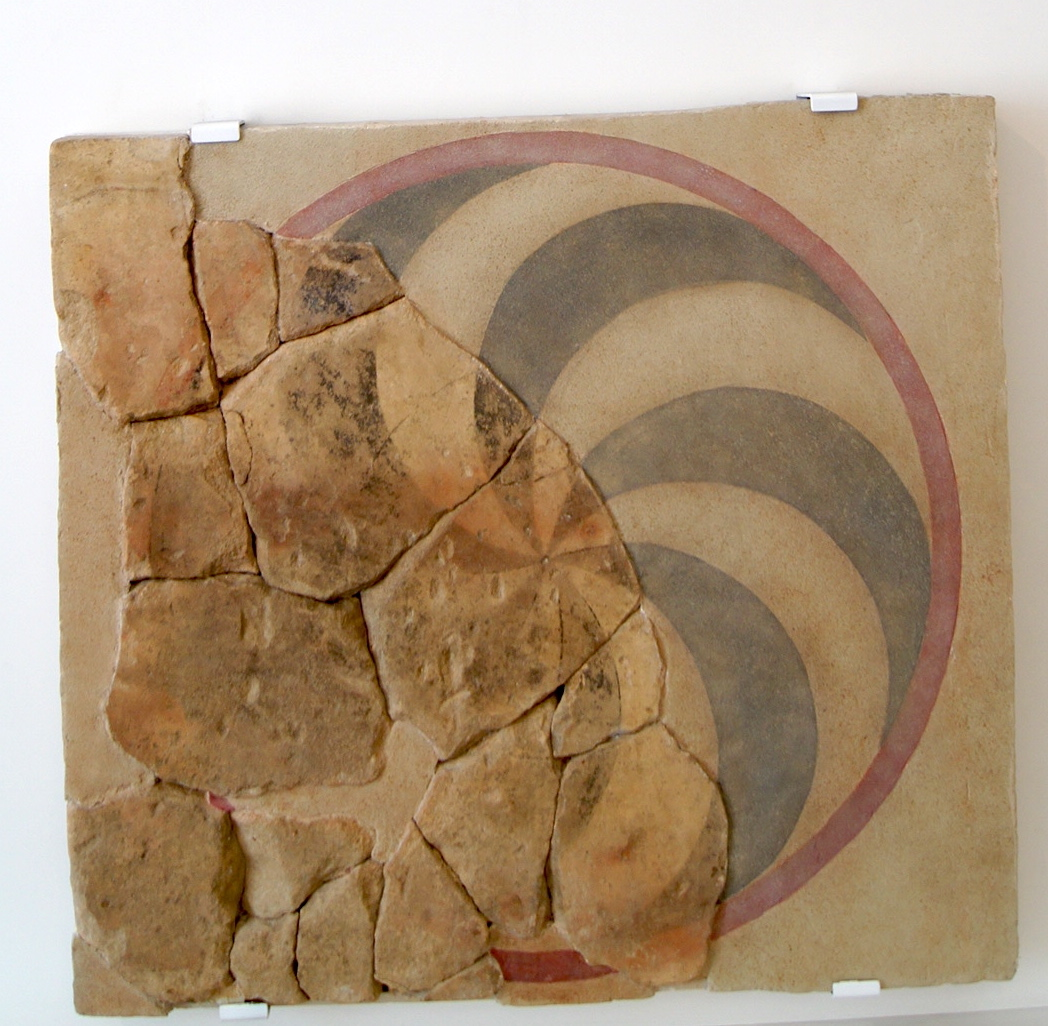
The 1st phase. Decoration from the frieze (Reggio museum).

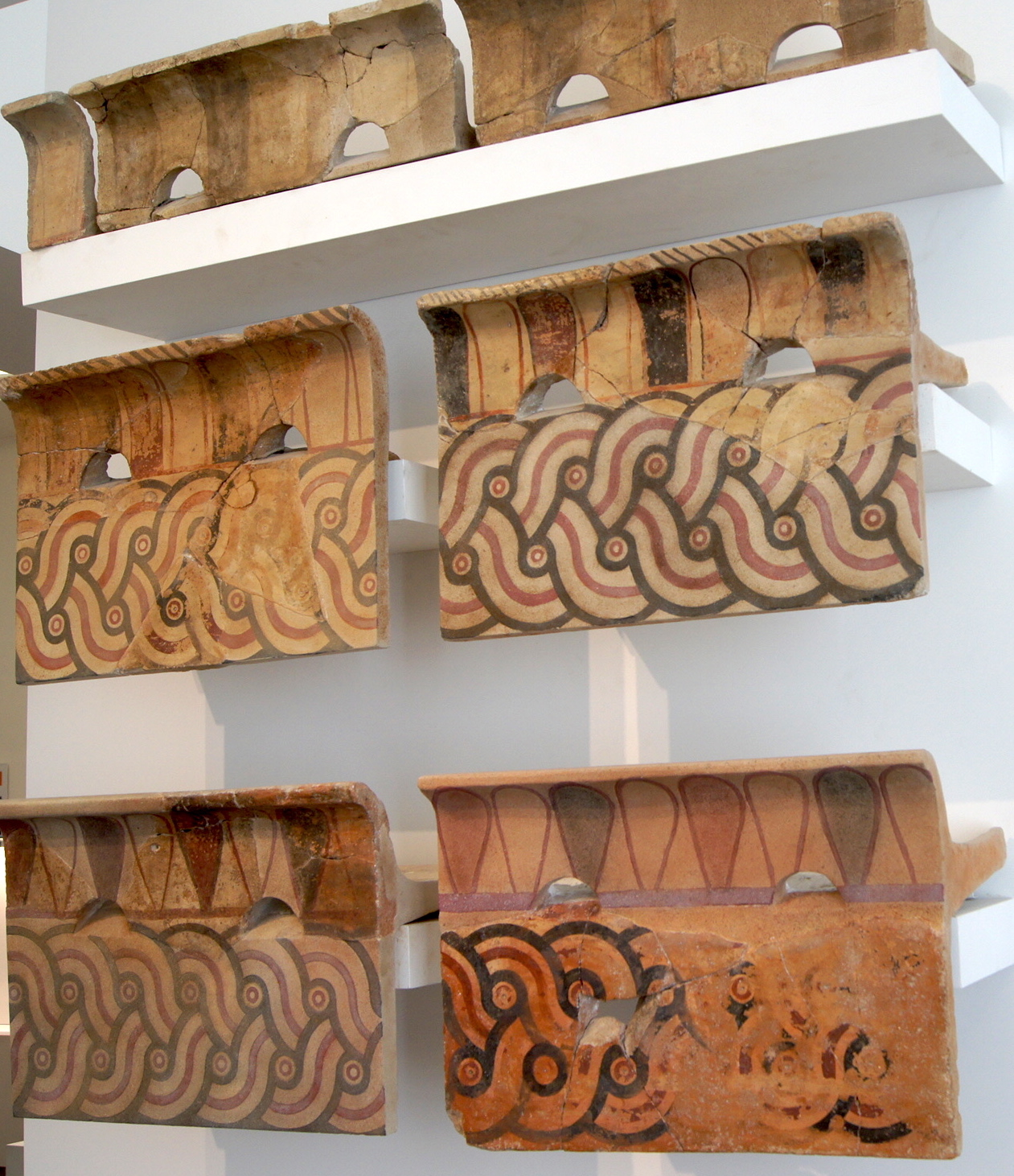
The 2nd phase of temple (1st half of c. 6th century BC).

==== Ludovisi Throne ====
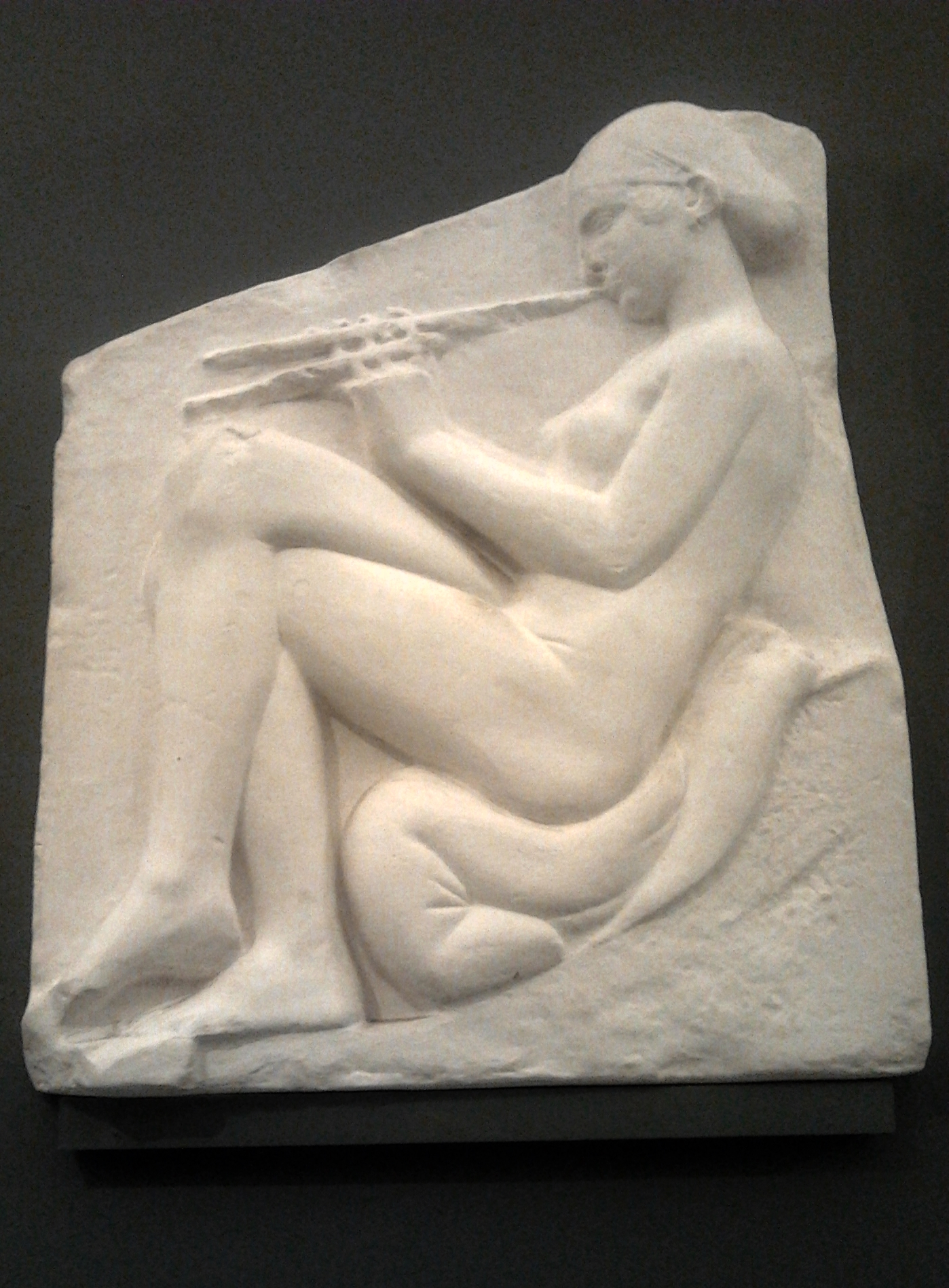
Left-hand panel of the throne: a woman playing the aulos.

According to many scholars, the Ludovisi Throne comes from the temple of Marasà. Furthermore, a fragment of pínax from 470–460 BC (currently in the Museum of Magna Graecia in Reggio Calabria) found in the temple of Persephone in Mannella, shows part of a female figure almost identical to one of the two women represented on the sides of the Ludovisi Throne. It is believed the throne was the parapet of the bothros, as it fits the three surviving stone slabs of the cladding still visible there.

=== Temple of Casa Marafioti ===
The Casa Marafioti temple is named after the 18th century Casino partly built over it. It used to stand on a small hill at the heart of the city dominating the public area. It may have been part of an extensive sanctuary, which stretched 100 m downhill to where the cist containing the archives of Olympian Zeus was found. If so, the temple would have been dedicated to Zeus, worshiped in Locri as the city's protector.

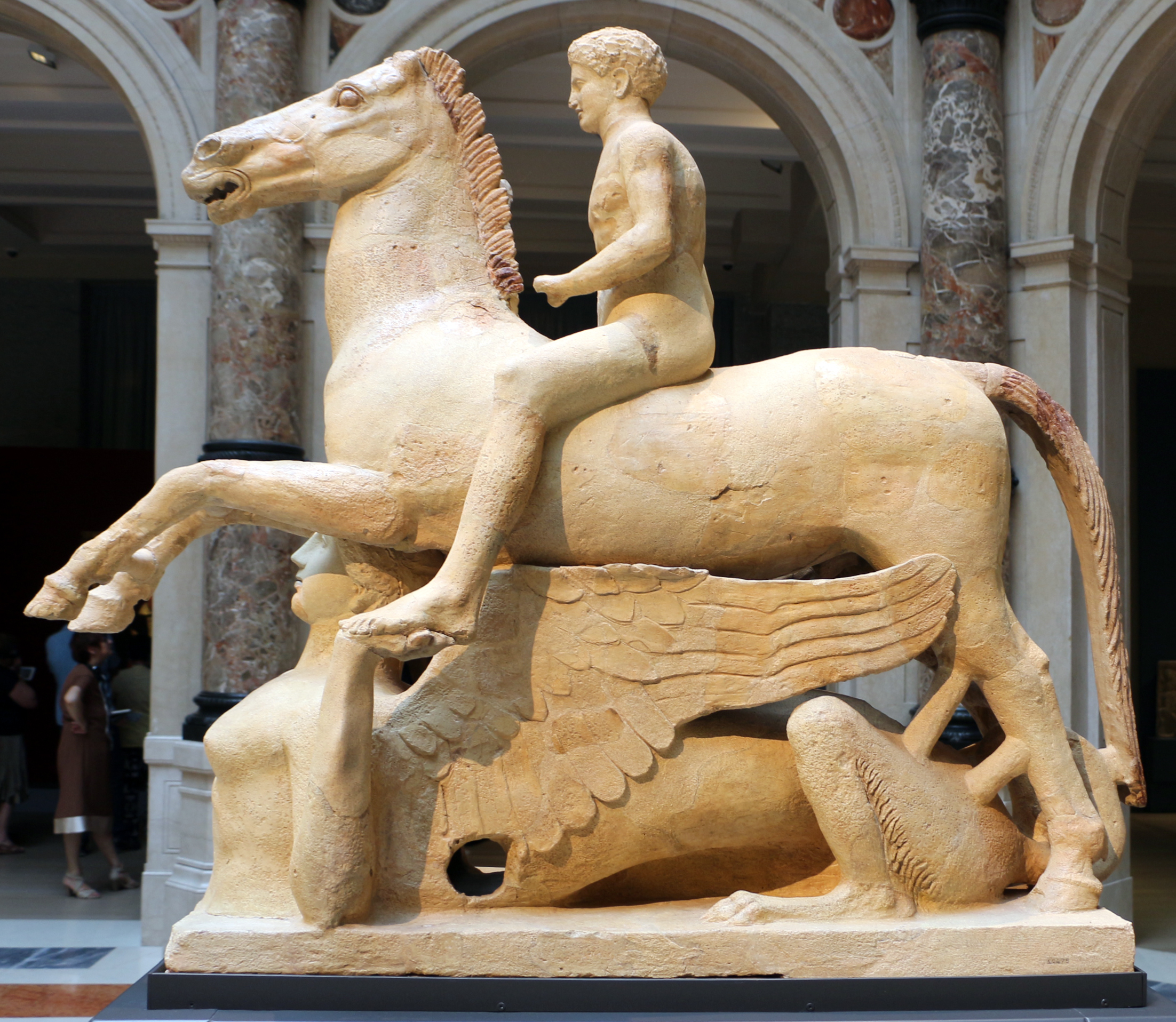
Terracotta knight from temple Casa Marafioti, 420–400 BC (Reggio museum)

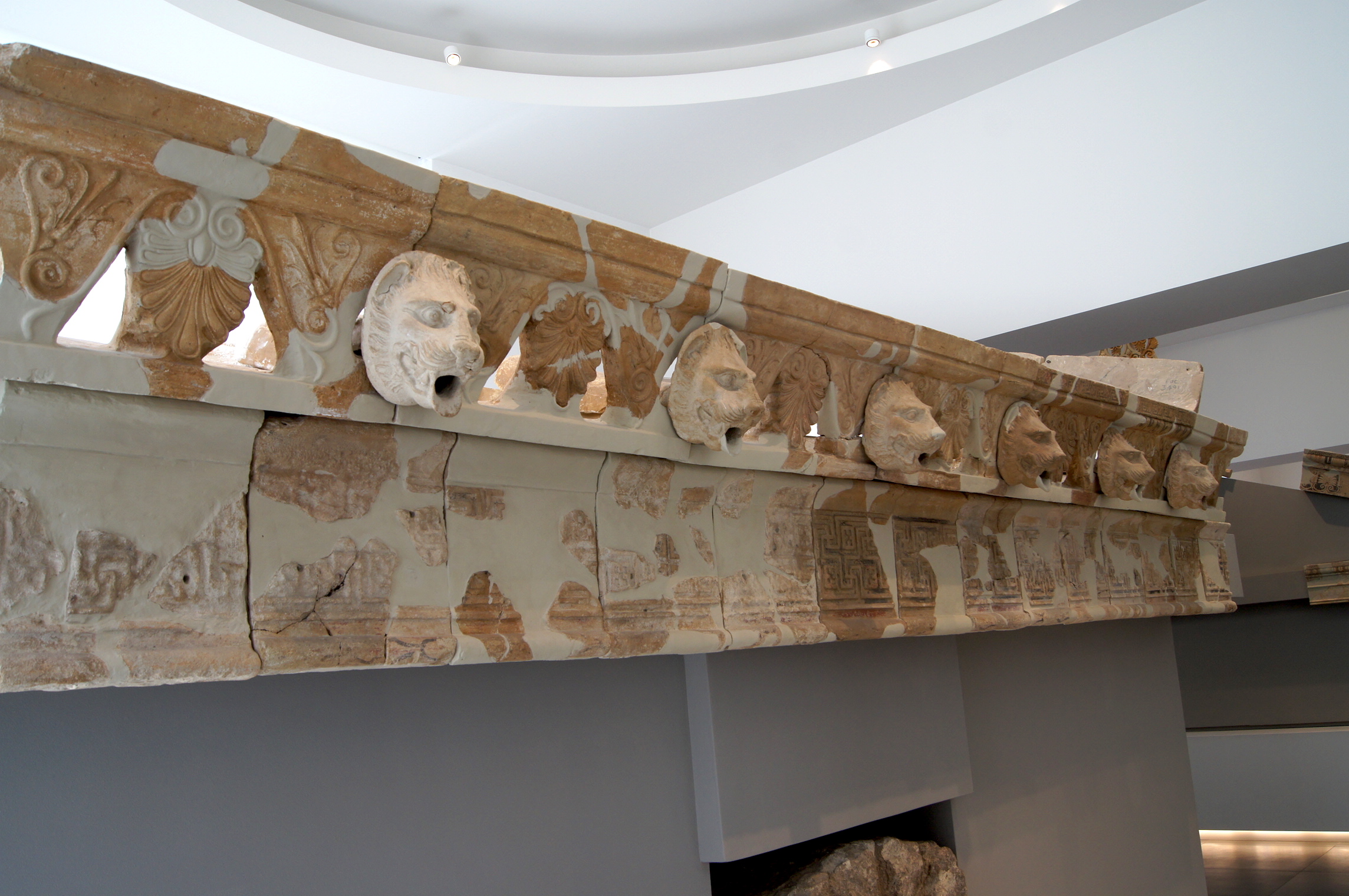
Terracotta frieze from Casa Marafioti temple, 2nd phase c. 5th century BC (Reggio museum)

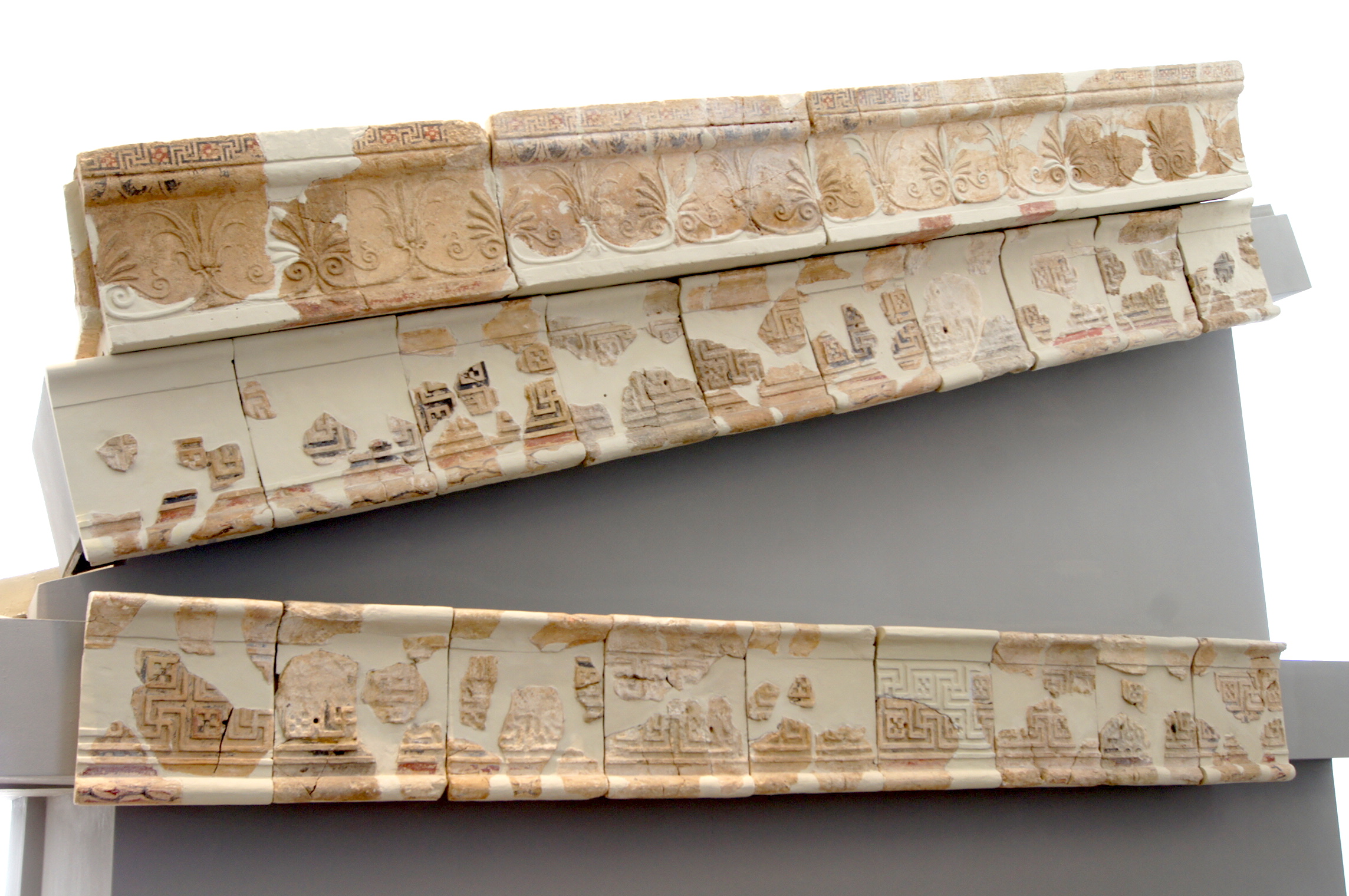
Casa Marafioti temple (Reggio museum)

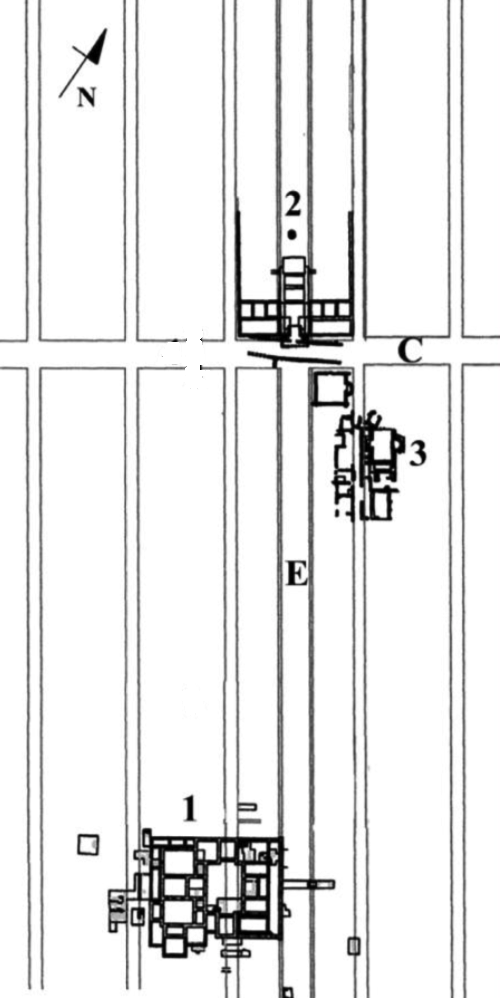
Monumental area of Roman Locri. 1: Later baths (Casino Macrì) 2: Orsi Building 3: Baths and domus C: Plateia east-west E: Plateia north-south

== Roman city ==
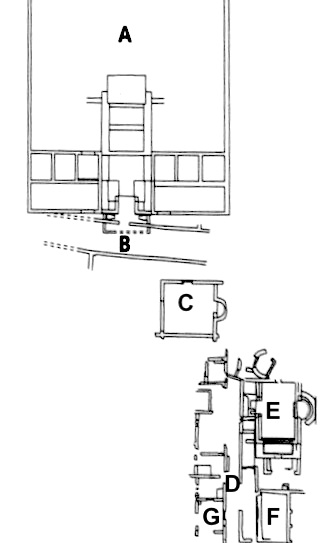
Early central area of Roman Locri.

Research from 1996 has revealed that in the early Imperial era (mid-1st century AD), there was a complete urban and cultural transformation of the ancient city. During this time period, the monuments and road networks were improved, most notably in the Petrara area, the political, administrative, and religious centre of the city. The urban plan was redesigned over Greek streets and buildings that had been used as dwellings and workshops.

Building A/B seems to be configured as a multifunctional complex, perhaps linked to the celebration of the dynastic cult and the elites of the city, the promoters of its architectural renewal. It also included commercial and perhaps also civic and administrative functions. It has similarities to the two contemporary and well-known examples of the Building of Eumachia in Pompeii, and the Augusteum of Herculaneum.
