= Sopater (mythology) =

Mythological man in Attica

In ancient Greek legend and myth, Sopater or Sopatrus (Ancient Greek: Σώπατρος, romanized: Sṓpatros) also called Diomus (Ancient Greek: Δίομος, romanized: Díomos) is a farmer residing in Athens who slaughtered an ox during an era where animal consumption and sacrifice were not yet permitted. Sopater fled to Crete until a famine in Attica forced him to return and establish animal sacrifices in honour of the gods. His legend is preserved in the writings of Porphyry of Tyre, a third-century Neoplatonic philosopher who wrote an treatise on the ethics of animal consumption.

== Myth ==
Back in the days when the Athenians sacrificed only fruits but not animals to the gods and themselves did not consume animal flesh at all, Sopater was a non-native resident cultivating land in Attica. During a festival, he set up a number of cakes and offerings on a table but they were eaten and trampled by an ox returning from its labour. Sopater, angry at the animal, seized a sharp axe and struck the animal with it. Once he came to his senses, he realised his mistake and buried the animal, and further voluntarily exiled himself to the island of Crete on account of his impiety.

Great dryness then fell upon Attica, destroying the crops. The people consulted the Pythia at Delphi and the she replied that the murderer should be punished properly, and the dead ox brought back to life on the spot of the sacrifice. An investigation was made and Sopater was as the culprit, so they sent out to find him in Crete. He, thinking that he could be expiated if everyone got involved communually, so he suggested that an ox should be slain by the city, and that he would deliver the blow if they granted him citizenship.

Upon their return to Athens, they sharpened an axe and a knife and the knife, Sopater slew the ox with the help of two more men, while others still undertook the skinning, while everyone ate its meat, so that they had all taken part in the murder. Then they stitched up the skin, stuffed it with straw and yoked it to a plough, so that the bull had been resurrected in the form of the stuffed animal. Then they held a trial for the murder, in which all the defendants were called to exonerate themselves; in the end the knife was found guilty of the murder and it was thrown into the sea. And from that day onwards, the ox sacrifices were carried out the same way. Sopater's descendants continued the rites and were dubbed boutypoi, "ox-hitters".

== See also ==
- Anagyros
- Telephus
- Veganism

== Bibliography ==
- Grimal, Pierre (1987). The Dictionary of Classical Mythology. Wiley-Blackwell. ISBN 0-631-13209-0.
- Porphyry of Tyre, On Abstinence from Killing Animals, translated into English by Gillian Clark. London, New York: Bloomsbury 2000. ISBN 978-0-7156-2901-7. Available online at Google Books.
