= Rhinthon =

Hellenistic dramatist (c. 323 – 285 BC)

Rhinthon (Ancient Greek: Ῥίνθων, gen.: Ῥίνθωνος; c. 323 – 285 BC) was a Hellenistic dramatist.

The son of a potter, he was probably a native of Syracuse, Magna Graecia, and afterwards settled at Tarentum.

He invented the hilarotragoedia (Ἱλαροτραγῳδία), a burlesque of tragic subjects. Such burlesques were also called phlyakes ("fooleries") and their writers phlyakographoi. He was the author of thirty-eight plays, of which only a few titles (Amphitryon, Heracles, Medea, Orestes) and lines have been preserved, chiefly by the grammarians, as illustrating dialectic Tarentine forms. The metre is iambic, in which the greatest licence is allowed. The scant fragments of his plays are collected in R. Kassel and C. Austin, Poetae Comici Graeci, vol. 1, pp. 260–70.

== Influence ==
The Amphitruo of Plautus was probably imitated from a different writer (Archippus of Middle Comedy), but illustrates how such subjects were treated. The hilarotragoedia exercised considerable influence on Latin comedy, the Rhinthonica (or fabula) being mentioned by various authorities amongst other kinds of drama known to the Romans. Scenes from these travesties are probably represented in certain vase paintings from Southern Italy.
