= Sopater of Paphos =

Ancient Greek playwright

Sopater of Paphos (Ancient Greek: Σώπατρος ὁ Πάφιος) was a 3rd-century BC parodist and playwright. Atheneus reports on his lifetime in his Deipnosophistae. According to Atheneus, Sopater of Paphos lived in the time of Alexander the Great, and "was still alive in the reign of the second king of Egypt". After Ptolemy II Philadelphus (308–246 BC) succeeded his father on the throne of Egypt in 283/2 BC, and considering that the work of Sopater was likely composed after Ptolemy II's victory against the Gauls in 270 BC and makes reference to him, scholars place Sopater in the last thirty years of the 4th and the first half of the 3rd century BC. He is believed to have spent a significant part of his life spent in Alexandria.

A few of Sopater's works are known to us through Atheneus' Deipnosophistae, these are: Bacchus, Eubulotheombrutus, Pylaeus and Phacis are described in the ancient source as dramas. Other sources like the 10th century Byzantine encyclopedia Suidas count nine works in total: Hippolytus, Physiologus, Silpho, Cnidia, Nekia, Pylaeus, Orestes, Phacis and Bacchus. Sopatros, in addition to the indicative of his Paphos descent, is called a parodist and a phlyax writer in Athenaeus, and a comedian in Suidas.
