= Ioannis Grivas =

Greek judge

- Ιωάννης Γρίβας

Prime Minister of Greece
- Caretaker; 12 October 1989 – 23 November 1989
- President: Christos Sartzetakis
- Preceded by: Tzannis Tzannetakis
- Succeeded by: Xenophon Zolotas

Personal details
- Born: 23 February 1923 Kato Tithorea, Amfikleia-Elateia, Greece
- Died: 27 November 2016 (aged 93) Athens, Greece
- Party: Independent
- Education: University of Athens

Ioannis Grivas (Greek: Ιωάννης Γρίβας; 23 February 1923 – 27 November 2016) was a Greek judge, who served as President of the Court of Cassation and served as the Prime Minister of Greece at the head of a non-party caretaker government in 1989.

== Life ==
Grivas was born in Kato Tithorea, Amfikleia-Elateia, Phthiotis. He studied law at the University of Athens and in 1954 he became a judge. He took part as a judge in the Greek Junta Trials in 1975, and in 1979, he was appointed to the Supreme Court of Greece for Civil and Criminal Cases. He became vice-president of the court in 1986 and president in 1989–90.

In 1989, Andreas Papandreou's government was rocked by the deterioration of the Greek economy and a series of corruption scandals, including Koskotas scandal. Papandreou changed the electoral law to prevent the opposition party from gaining a majority, leading to the Greek Parliament being deadlocked following the 18 June 1989 elections. A coalition between conservatives and communists, with a limited mandate, formed a government under Tzannis Tzannetakis to investigate the corruption in Papandreou's government. After the indictment of Papandreou and several of his ministers, the coalition was resolved. The Constitution required the president of one of Greece's Supreme Courts to be appointed interim Prime Minister. Grivas agreed to head a caretaker government to preside over fresh elections.

He took office on 12 October 1989 to lead the country to new elections, held on 5 November. After the elections produced another deadlocked Parliament, he resigned on 23 November 1989 in favor of Xenophon Zolotas, who formed a National Unity government in which all three parliamentary parties participated. In domestic policy, maternity leave was extended to 15 weeks.

Grivas retired in 1990. He died on 27 November 2016, aged 93.

Legal offices
Preceded by Antonios Stasinos	President of the Supreme Court; 1989–1990	Succeeded by Vasilios Kokkinos
Political offices
Preceded by Tzannis Tzannetakis	Prime Minister of Greece; Caretaker; 1989	Succeeded by Xenophon Zolotas
