= Thomas Chipp =

Thomas Chipp may refer to:

- Thomas Paul Chipp (1793–1870), English harpist and composer
- Thomas Ford Chipp (1886–1931), English botanist
