= Gorgopotamos (disambiguation) =

Gorgopotamos (Greek: Γοργοπόταμος meaning the rushing river), may refer to:

- Gorgopotamos, a village, a municipality and a historic bridge in Phthiotis, Greece
  - Gorgopotamos railway station, a railway station serving the village in Phthiotis, Greece
- Gorgopotamos (river), a river in Phthiotis, Greece
- Gorgopotamos, Ioannina, a village in the Ioannina regional unit, Greece
