= La Chasse =

La Chasse, French for The Hunt, may refer to:

- Symphony No. 73 (Haydn)
- String Quartet No. 17 (Mozart)
- Piano Sonata No. 18 (Beethoven)
- Caprice No. 9 "The Hunt" in E major: Allegretto, from Niccolò Paganini's 24 Caprices for Solo Violin
- Étude No. 5 (La chasse) in E major, Franz Liszt's arrangement of this caprice as the fifth of his six Grandes Etudes de Paganini
- La Chasse, a lost opera by Chevalier de Saint-Georges
- La Chasse, Caprice in the style of Cartier, by Fritz Kreisler
- Op. 16, La Chasse For Keyboard, by Muzio Clementi
- Symphony in D major, by Antonio Rosetti
- La Chasse, popular chanson of famed Renaissance composer Clément Janequin (c. 1485 – 1558)
- La Chasse (painting), a 1911 painting by Albert Gleizes
- La Chasse (plaquette), an artwork by Júlia Báthory
