= List of compositions by Muzio Clementi =

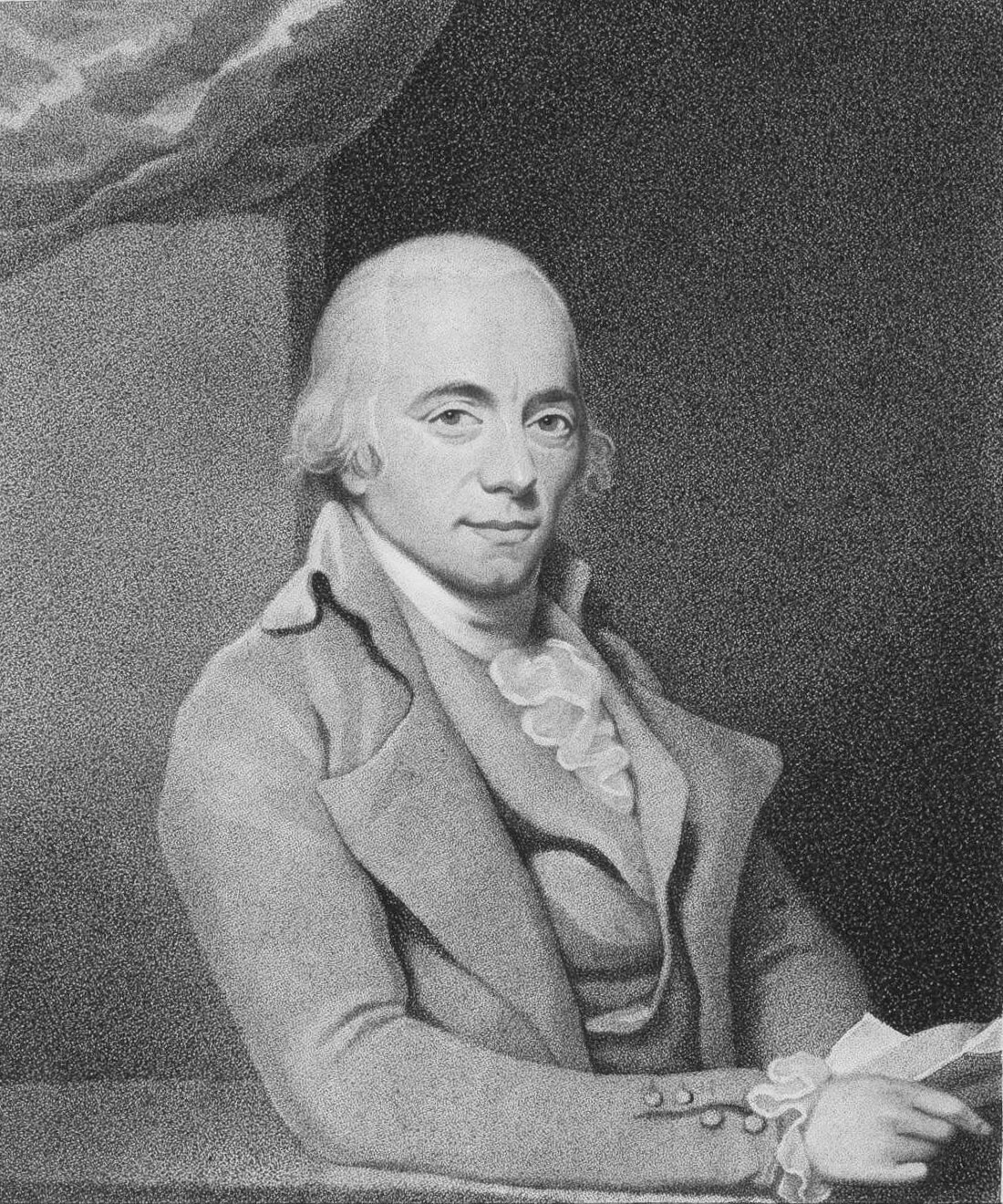
Muzio Clementi

This is a list of compositions by Muzio Clementi.

Clementi was a celebrated composer, pianist, pedagogue, conductor, music publisher, editor, and piano manufacturer. He is best known for his piano sonatas, and his collection of piano studies, Gradus ad Parnassum. Nineteenth century enthusiasts lauded Clementi as "the father of the pianoforte", "father of modern piano technique", and "father of Romantic pianistic virtuosity".

== With opus numbers ==
- Op. 1, 6 Sonatas for Keyboard (E♭, G, B♭, F, A, E), dedicated to Clementi's English patron, Sir Peter Beckford. Published in 1771.
- Op. 1a, 4 Sonatas for Keyboard (1 to 4: F, B♭, G, A), 1 Fugue for Keyboard (5: a, revised as Op. 44 No. 69 in his Gradus Ad Parnassum) and 1 Duet for Two Keyboards (6: B♭), dedicated to Mme. Duvivier. Published in 1780.
- Op. 2, 3 Sonatas for Keyboard and Flute/Violin (1, 3, and 5: E♭, G, F) and 3 Sonatas for Keyboard (2, 4, and 6: C, A, B♭), No.2 is known as Clementi's celebrated octave lesson. Published in 1779. Clementi will later revise Sonatas Nos.2, 4, and 6 and publish them in 1807.
- Op. 3, 3 Duets for Keyboard In Four Hands (1 to 3: C, E♭, C) and 3 Sonatas for Keyboard and Flute/Violin (4 to 6: F, B♭, C). Published in 1779.
- Op. 4, 6 Sonatas for Keyboard and Violin/Flute (D, E♭, C, G, E♭, F). Published in 1780. Later revised as Sonatinas and published as Op. 37a (No.1–3) and Op. 38a (No.4–6) in 1798.
- Op. 5, 3 Sonatas for Keyboard and Violin (1 to 3: Bb, F, Eb) and 3 Fugues for Keyboard (4 to 6: B♭, F, b). Published in 1780. The 3 Fugues will be revised as Op. 44 No. 57, 40 and 25 respectively in the Gradus Ad Parnassum.
- Op. 6, 1 Duet for Keyboard In Four Hands (1: C), 2 Sonatas for Keyboard and Violin (2 and 3: E♭, E), and 3 Fugues for Keyboard (4 to 6: c, C, e). Published in 1780. The 3 Fugues will be revised as Op. 44 No. 45, 13 and 74 respectively in the Gradus ad Parnassum.
- Op. 7, 3 Sonatas for Keyboard (E♭, C, g). Dedicated to Mme de Hess, née de Leporini. Published in 1782.
- Op. 8, 3 Sonatas for Keyboard (g, E♭, B♭). Dedicated to Mlle Victoire Imbert. Published in 1782.
- Op. 9, 3 Sonatas for Keyboard (B♭, C, E♭). Published in Vienna by Artaria in 1783.
- Op. 10, 3 Sonatas for Keyboard (A, D, B♭). Dedicated to Countess von Grundermann. Published in Vienna by Artaria in 1783.
- Op. 11, No.1, Sonata in E♭ major (Originally composed for Mme de Hess in B♭ major in 2 Movements only and published in 1781); No.2, Toccata in B♭ major for Keyboard. Published in 1783.
- Op. 12, 4 Sonatas for Piano (1 to 4: B♭, E♭, F, E♭) and 1 Duet for Two Pianos (5: B♭). Dedicated to Miss Glover. Published in 1784; Note: The 3rd movement of No. 1: Variations on 'Je suis Lindor', Antoine-Laurent Baudron's setting of the romanze from Beaumarchais' Barbier de Séville.
- Op. 13, 3 Sonatas for Keyboard and Violin/Flute (1 to 3: G, C, E♭) and 3 Sonatas for Piano (4 to 6: B♭, F, f). Dedicated to Count von Brühl. Published in 1785.
- Op. 14, 3 Duets for Piano In Four Hands (C, F, E♭). Published in 1785. Clementi will revise No.3 in 1815.
- Op. 15, 3 Sonatas for Piano and Violin (Eb, C, B♭). Published in 1786.
- Op. 16, La Chasse for Keyboard in D major. Published in 1786.
- Op. 17, Capriccio for Keyboard in B♭ major. Published in 1787.
- Op. 18, 2 Symphonies for Orchestra (No.1 in B♭ major; No.2 in D major). Published in 1787.
- Op. 19, Musical Characteristics for Keyboard Consisting in 12 Preludes and 6 Cadenzas alla Haydn, Mozart, Kozeluch, Sterkel, Vanhal, Clementi. Published in 1787.
- Op. 20, Sonata for Keyboard in C major. Published in 1787.
- Op. 21, 3 Sonatas for Keyboard, Flute, and Violoncello (D, G, C). Published in 1788. Clementi arranged No.1 for 2 Keyboards.
- Op. 22, 3 Sonatas for Keyboard, Flute/Violin, and Violoncello (D, G, C). Published in 1789. Clementi arranged No.3 for 2 Keyboards.
- Op. 23, 3 Sonatas for Keyboard (E♭, F, E♭). Published in 1790.
- Op. 24, 2 Sonatas for Keyboard (F, B♭), composed before 1781; registered 23 July 1788; published in 1790.
- Op. 25, 6 Sonatas for Piano (C, G, B♭, A, f♯, D). Published in 1790.
- Op. 26, Sonata for Keyboard in F major. Published in 1791.
- Op. 27, 3 Sonatas for Keyboard, Violin, and Violoncello (F, D, G). Published in 1791.
- Op. 28, 3 Sonatas for Keyboard, Violin, and Violoncello (C, E♭, G). Published in 1792.
- Op. 29, 3 Sonatas for Keyboard, Violin/Flute, and Violoncello (C, G, b). Published in 1793.
- Op. 30, Sonata for Keyboard and Violin in C major. Revision of Sonata Op. 2 No.2 with Violin accompaniment. Published in 1794.
- Op. 31, Sonata for Keyboard and Violin/Flute in A major. Revision of Sonata Op. 2 No.4 with Violin or Flute accompaniment. Published in 1794.
- Op. 32, 3 Sonatas for Piano With Optional Flute and Violoncello (F, D, C). Published in 1793.
- Op. 33, 3 Sonatas for Piano (A, F, C). Published in 1794.
- Op. 34, 2 Sonatas for Piano (1 and 2: C, G minor) and 2 Capriccios for Piano (3 and 4: A, F). Published in 1795.
- Op. 35, 3 Sonatas for Piano With Optional Violin and Violoncello (C, G, B). Published in 1796.
- Op. 36, 6 Sonatinas for Piano (C, G, C, F, G, D). Published in 1797.
- Op. 37, 3 Sonatas for Piano (C, G, D). Published in 1798.
- Op. 37a, 3 Sonatinas for Piano (D, E♭, C). Identical to Op. 4 No.1–3 without accompaniment, re-edited in 1798.
- Op. 38, 12 Waltzes for Piano, Triangle, and Tambourine (D, G, B, G, E♭, A, C, G, C, B♭, C, A). Published in 1798.
- Op. 38a, 3 Sonatinas for Piano (G, E♭, F). Identical to Op. 4 No.4–6 without accompaniment, re-edited in 1798.
- Op. 39, 12 Waltzes for Piano, Triangle, and Tambourine (C, A, F, F♯, C, G, E♭, G, C, F, B♭, Eb). Published in 1800.
- Op. 40, 3 Sonatas for Piano (G, b, D). Published in 1802.
- Op. 41, Sonata for Keyboard in E♭ major. Published in 1803.
- Op. 42, Introduction to the Art of Playing on the Piano forte. Published in 1801.
- Op. 43, Appendix to Introduction to the Art of Playing on the Piano forte. Published in 1811.
- Op. 44, Gradus Ad Parnassum, or The Art of Playing on the Piano forte, exemplified in a series of exercises in the strict free style. Published in 1817, 1819, and 1826. Contains 103 Exercises.
- Op. 45, Opus Number never assigned to any Work.
- Op. 46, Sonata for Piano in B♭ major. Published in 1820.
- Op. 47, 2 Capriccios for Piano (e, C). Published in 1821.
- Op. 48, Fantasy With Variations on Au Clair de la Lune for Piano in C minor. Published in 1821.
- Op. 49, 12 Monferrinas for Piano (G, C, E, C, A, d, D, B♭, G, C, f, C). Published in 1821.
- Op. 50, 3 Sonatas for Piano (A, d, g). No.3 entitled "Didone abbandonata". Published in 1821.
  - First movement, “Largo patetico e sostenuto – Allegro ma con espressione” (12:12):
  - Second movement, “Adagio dolente” (5:16):
  - Third movement, “Allegro agitato, e con disperazione” (6:17):

== Without opus numbers ==
- WoO 1, Oratorio: Martirio de' gloriosi santi Giuliano e Celso (lost). Composed in 1764.
- WoO 2, Black Joke for Keyboard in C major. Composed in 1777 and published in 1780.
- WoO 3, Sonata for Keyboard in F major. Published in 1789.
- WoO 4, 2 Canzonettas for Soprano and Keyboard. Vieni oh caro amato bene and Senza il diletto mio. Published in 1792.
- WoO 5, Mr. Collick's Minuet for Keyboard in D minor. Published in 1793.
- WoO 6, Sonata for Piano, Violin/Flute, and Violoncello in C major. Published in 1794.
- WoO 7, Practical Harmony for Organ/Piano. Published in 1801.
- WoO 8, Rondo for Keyboard in B♭ major. Published in 1802.
- WoO 9, Melodies Of Different Nations for Voice and Piano. Published in 1814. Cycle of 14 Songs.
- WoO 10, Variazioni su un tema di Mozart 'Batti, batti' for Piano in F major. Published in 1820.
- WoO 11, Canon ad diapason for Piano in C major. Published in 1830.
- WoO 12, Concerto for Piano and Orchestra in C major. Arrangement of Sonata Op. 33 No.3, done in 1796.
- WoO 13, Sonata for Keyboard in A♭ major. Composed in 1765.
- WoO 14, Sonata for Keyboard in G major. Composed in 1768.
- WoO 15, Monferrina for Piano in C major. Composed in 1821.
- WoO 16, Monferrina for Piano in F major. Composed in 1821.
- WoO 17, Monferrina for Piano in E♭ major. Composed in 1821.
- WoO 18, Monferrina for Piano in D major. Composed in 1821.
- WoO 19, Monferrina for Piano in B♭ major. Composed in 1821.
- WoO 20, Monferrina for Piano in G major. Composed in 1821.
- WoO 21, Tarentella for Piano in A minor.
- WoO 22, Allegro for Piano in E♭ major.
- WoO 23, Finale for Piano in B♭ major.
- WoO 24, Duettino for Piano Four Hands No.1 in C major (3 Movements).
- WoO 25, Duettino for Piano Four Hands No.2 in G major (2 Movements).
- WoO 26, Duettino for Piano Four Hands No.3 in C major (1 Movement).
- WoO 27, Duettino for Piano Four Hands No.4 in C major (1 Movement).
- WoO 28, Duettino for Piano Four Hands No.5 in C major (1 Movement).
- WoO 29, Canon for Cherubini In Three Parts for Two Violins and Viola. Composed in 1821. Also published for Piano.
- WoO 30, Nonet for Flute, Oboe, Clarinet, Bassoon, Horn, Violin, Viola, Violoncello, and Contrabass in E♭ major. (1 Movement = Andante)
- WoO 31, Nonet for Flute, Oboe, Clarinet, Bassoon, Horn, Violin, Viola, Violoncello, and Contrabass in E♭ major. (1 Movement = Allegro)
- WoO 32, Symphony for Orchestra No.1 in C major
- WoO 33, Symphony for Orchestra No.2 in D major
- WoO 34, Symphony for Orchestra No.3 in G major. Entitled "Great National Symphony"
- WoO 35, Symphony for Orchestra No.4 in D major
- WoO 36, Apertura (2 Overtures) (No.1 in C major; No.2 in D major), and Minuetto Pastorale in D major, for Orchestra

== Arrangements of contemporaneous composers' works ==
- Mozart's Symphony No.35 for Piano, Flute, Violin and Cello. Published in 1819.
- Mozart's Symphony No.36 for Piano, Flute, Violin and Cello. Published in 1817.
- Mozart's Symphony No.38 for Piano, Flute, Violin and Cello. Published in 1815.
- Mozart's Symphony No.39 for Piano, Flute, Violin and Cello. Published in 1819.
- Mozart's Symphony No.40 for Piano, Flute, Violin and Cello. Published in 1819.
- Mozart's Symphony No.41 for Piano, Flute, Violin and Cello. Published in 1818.
- Haydn's Symphony No.94 for Piano, Flute, Violin and Cello.
- Haydn's Symphony No.97 for Piano, Flute, Violin and Cello.
- Haydn's Symphony No.102 for Piano, Flute, Violin and Cello.
- Haydn's Symphony No.103 for Piano, Flute, Violin and Cello.
- Haydn's Symphony No.104 for Piano, Flute, Violin and Cello.
- Pleyel's String Quartet in B♭ major for Piano, Flute and Violoncello.
- Pieces by various composers (Corelli, Gluck, Haydn, Mozart, Sterkel, Wanhal, Kozeluch) as examples in his 'Introduction to the Art of Playing on the Piano forte' Op. 42.
