= Gradus ad Parnassum =

Latin phrase used figuratively to mean "gradual progress towards mastery"

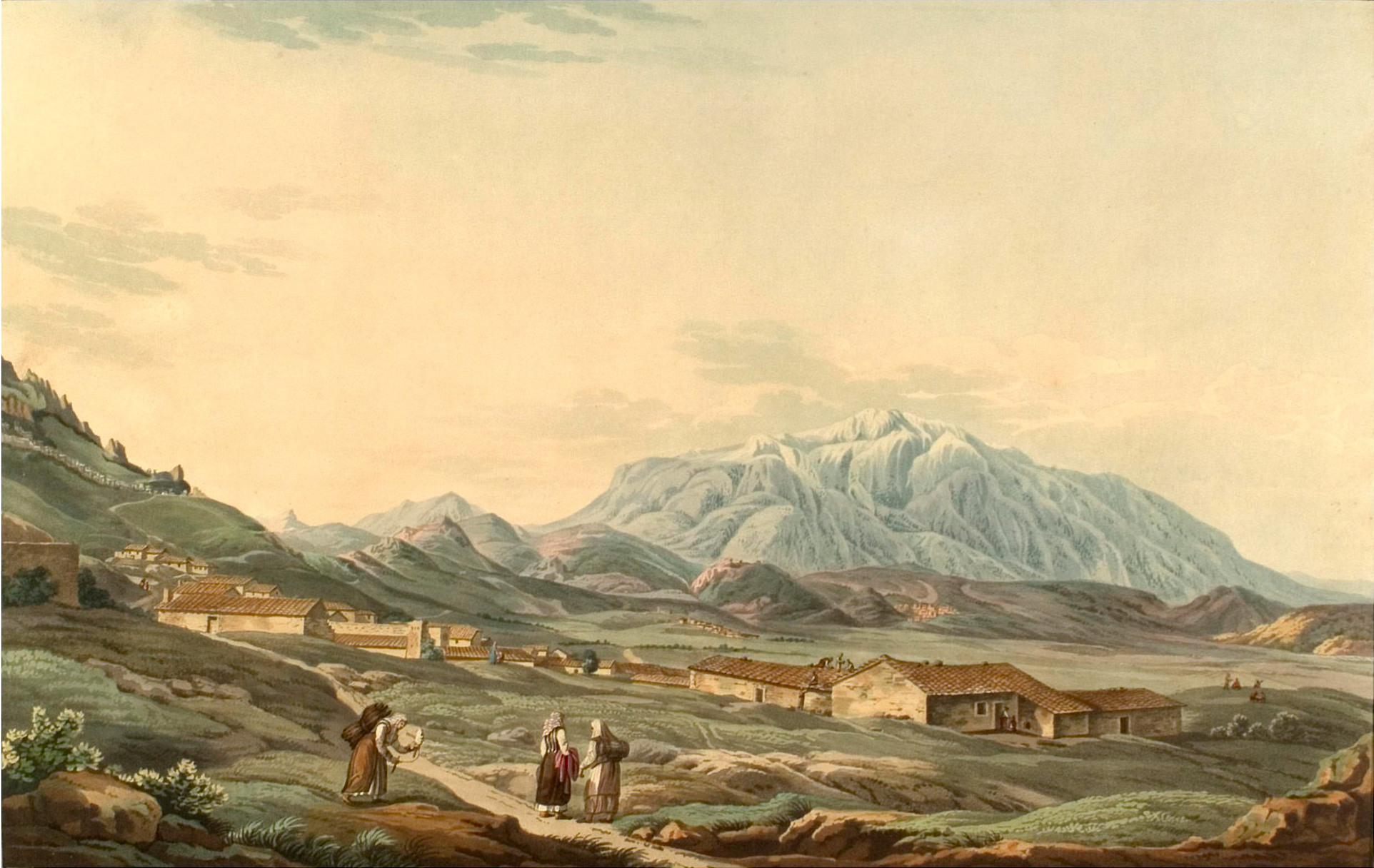
Painting of Mount Parnassus from Edward Dodwell's Views in Greece, 1821

The Latin phrase gradus ad Parnassum means "a step towards Parnassus". It is sometimes shortened to gradus. Parnassus is the prominence of a mountain range in central Greece, a few kilometres north of Delphi, of which the two summits, in Classical times, were called Tithorea and Lycoreia. In Greek mythology, one of the peaks was sacred to Apollo and the nine Muses, the inspiring deities of the arts, and the other to Dionysus. The phrase came to be used by authors of various books of instruction with the aid of which gradual progress and mastery in an art or scholarly discipline is sought.

== Classics ==
The first application of the phrase is to a kind of Latin or Greek dictionary, in which the quantities of the vowels are marked in the words, to help beginners to understand the principles of Latin verse composition, in relation to the values of the metrical feet.

The Gradus ad Parnassum made famous under the name of Jesuit Paul Aler (1656–1727), a schoolmaster, published in 1686, presented anew an earlier Thesaurus attributed to Pierre Joulet, sieur de Chastillon (1545–1621). This was not a general dictionary but a thesaurus of synonyms, epithets, verses and phrases in classical poetic usage. The work in Aler's form existed into the 19th century with the definitions as well as the entries written in Latin. Known to many generations of students throughout Europe, and passing through numerous editions, 19th-century English-speaking schoolchildren knew the 1818 revision by Dr John Carey (1756–1826) simply as 'Carey's Gradus'. It was specially intended for the study and appreciation of Latin poetry of the classical period, and to aid students in the practice of verse composition. There is also a Latin gradus by C.D. Yonge (1850); English-Latin by AC Ainger and HG Wintle (1890); Latin-French by F.J.M. Noël (1810); Greek by Thomas Morell (1762, new ed. ed. by E. Maltby, Bishop of Durham, 1815); John Brasse (1828).

The large general dictionaries of Greek and Latin adopted this pattern of information. For example, the Liddell-Scott-Jones Greek-English Lexicon (1843) and its current derivatives give quantity information where it is crucial and where it is available; so do Charlton T. Lewis and Charles Short's A Latin Dictionary (1879) and its derivatives. The synonyms, epithets, poetical expressions and extracts became incorporated under the more important headings.

=== Yonge ===
Charles Duke Yonge published A gradus ad Parnassum: For the use of Eton, Westminster, Harrow, and Charterhouse schools, King's college, London, and Marlborough college in 1850 a work that was still in print in 1902, by then titled ...For the use of Eton, Westminster, Harrow, Charterhouse and Rugby schools, King's college, London, and Marlborough college and bound with A Dictionary of Epithets: Classified according to their English meaning.

== Music and art ==
Works entitled Gradus ad Parnassum include:

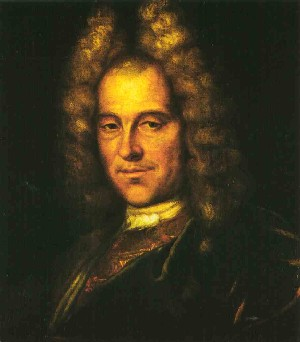
Johann Joseph Fux who wrote a seminal book on counterpoint called Gradus ad Parnassum

- a seminal textbook on counterpoint written by Johann Joseph Fux in 1725, still used today for instruction in musical theory and composition; Leopold Mozart is said to have taught his son Wolfgang from its pages. Beethoven held it in great esteem, and Haydn meticulously worked out each of its exercises.
- a collection of 100 instructional piano pieces by Muzio Clementi
- a collection of instructional piano pieces by Carl Czerny
- a collection of instructional violin studies by Ernst Heim
- a series of pedagogical works for violin by Jakob Dont
- a collection of 24 double bass studies by Franz Simandl
- a collection of pedagogical studies for violin by Émile Sauret
- a collection of pedagogical studies for harmonium by Sigfrid Karg-Elert
- a piano sonatina by Hanns Eisler
- an album cd or streaming from 2023 by harpsichord player Jean Rondeau
- an album by the band Mirar

Doctor Gradus ad Parnassum is a satirical piano composition by Claude Debussy, from his suite Children's Corner, poking fun at one or the other of these sets of exercises (Czerny's, according to Myriam Chimènes's notes to the Arturo Benedetti Michelangeli version).

Samuel Coleridge-Taylor wrote a nonet, his Op. 2, subtitled Gradus ad Parnassum, not as a pedagogical work but to display composition skills while he was a student at London's Royal College of Music.

Ad Parnassum is a significant painting in the divisionist style by Paul Klee.

Since the year 2000, the name Gradus ad Parnassum was incorporated as the name of a small music school in New Jersey, Gradus ad Parnassum Inc.
