= Muzio Clementi =

Italian composer and pianist (1752–1832)

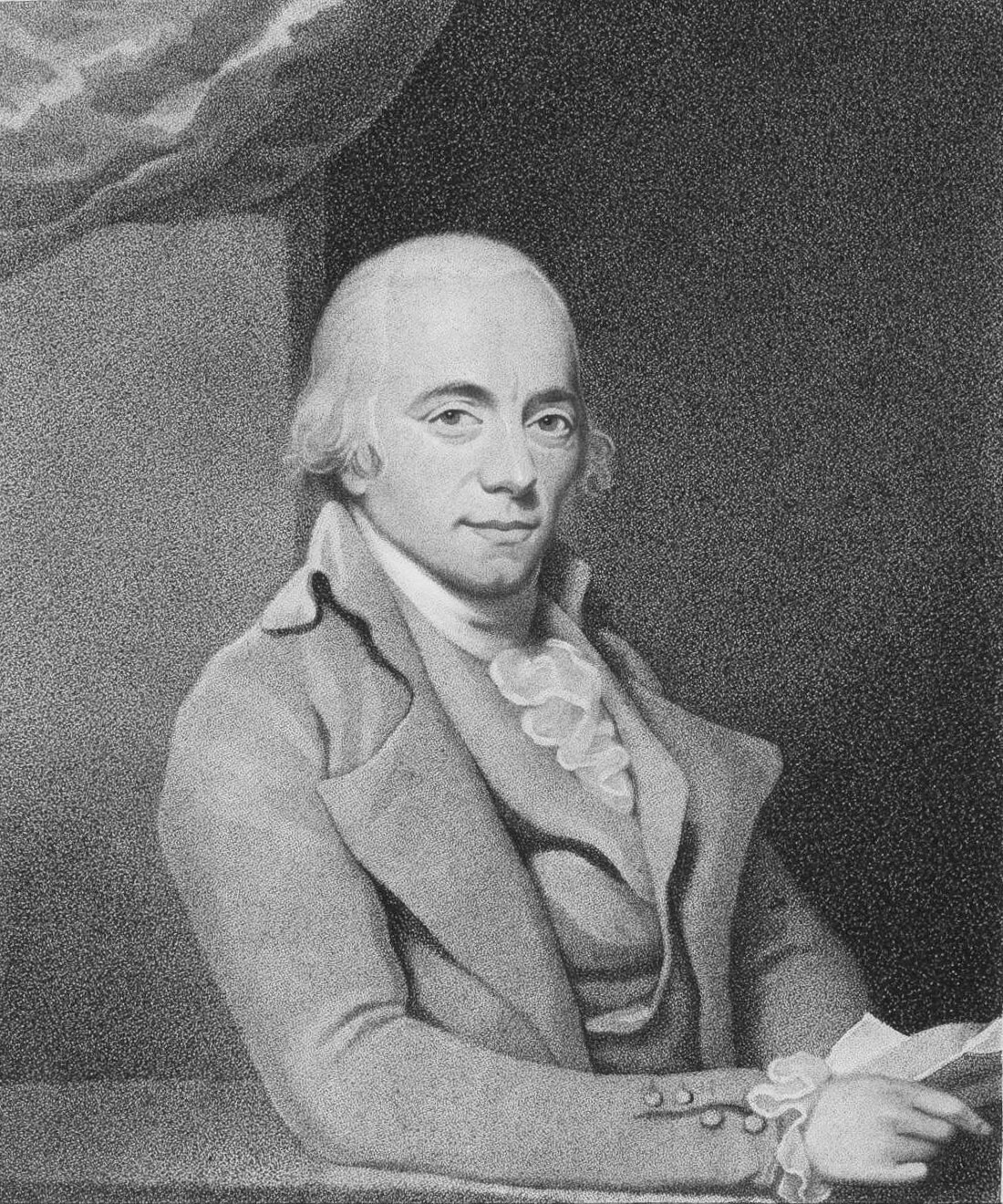
- 1794 portrait
- Born: 23 January 1752; Rome, Papal States
- Died: 10 March 1832 (aged 80); Evesham, Worcestershire, England
- Occupations: Composer; pianist; pedagogue; editor
- Era: Classical
- Works: See list

Signature
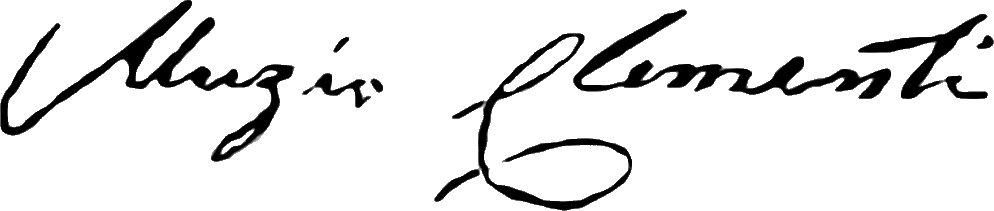

Muzio Filippo Vincenzo Francesco Saverio Clementi (23 January 1752 – 10 March 1832) was an Italian composer, virtuoso pianist, pedagogue, conductor, music publisher, editor, and piano manufacturer who was mostly active in England.

Encouraged to study music by his father, he was sponsored as a young composer by Sir Peter Beckford, who took him to England to advance his studies. Later, he toured Europe numerous times from his long-standing base in London. It was on one of these occasions, in 1781, that he engaged in a piano competition with Wolfgang Amadeus Mozart.

Influenced by Domenico Scarlatti's harpsichord school and Joseph Haydn's classical school and by the stile Galante of Johann Christian Bach and Ignazio Cirri, Clementi developed a fluent and technical legato style, which he passed on to a generation of pianists, including John Field, Johann Baptist Cramer, Ignaz Moscheles, Giacomo Meyerbeer, Friedrich Kalkbrenner, Johann Nepomuk Hummel, and Carl Czerny. He was a notable influence on Ludwig van Beethoven and Frédéric Chopin.

Clementi also produced and promoted his own brand of pianos and was a notable music publisher. Because of this activity, many compositions by Clementi's contemporaries and earlier artists have stayed in the repertoire. Though the reputation of Clementi was exceeded only by Haydn, Mozart, Beethoven, and Gioachino Rossini in his day, his popularity languished for much of the 19th and 20th centuries.

== Life ==
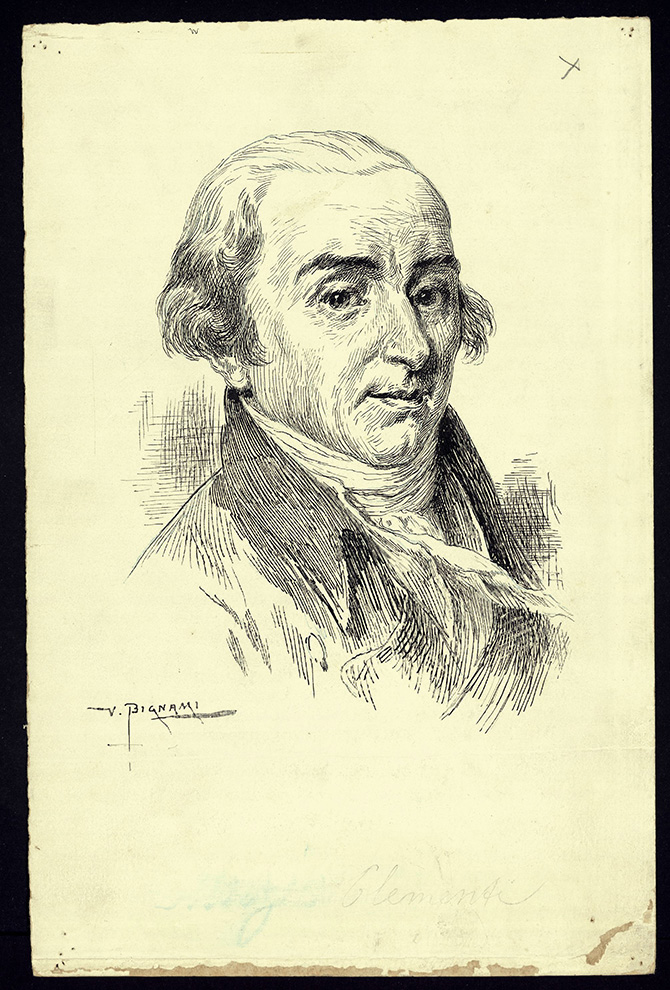
Posthumous portrait of Clementi (before 1929)

=== Childhood ===
Muzio Filippo Vincenzo Francesco Saverio Clementi (baptised Mutius Philippus Vincentius Franciscus Xaverius) was born in Rome in the Papal States on 23 January 1752, and baptised the following day at San Lorenzo in Damaso. He was the eldest of the seven children of Nicolò Clementi, a silversmith, and Madalena, née Caisar (Magdalena Kaiser). Nicolò soon recognised Muzio's musical talent and arranged for private musical instruction with a relative, Antonio Baroni, the maestro di cappella at St Peter's Basilica.

=== Education ===
At the age of seven, Clementi began studies in figured bass with the organist S. Giovanni Cardarelli, followed by voice lessons from Giuseppe Santarelli. A few years later, probably when he was 11 or 12, he was given counterpoint lessons by Gaetano Carpani. By the age of 13, Clementi had already composed an oratorio, Martirio de' gloriosi Santi Giuliano e Celso, and a mass. When he was 14, in January 1766, he became organist of the parish church of San Lorenzo in Dámaso.

=== Move to England ===
In 1766, Sir Peter Beckford, a wealthy Englishman, nephew of William Beckford (twice Lord Mayor of London, and father of the novelist William Beckford), visited Rome. He was impressed by the young Clementi's musical talent and negotiated with his father to take him to his estate, Stepleton House, north of Blandford Forum in Dorset, England. Beckford agreed to provide quarterly payments to sponsor the boy's musical education until he reached the age of 21. In return, he was expected to provide musical entertainment. For the next seven years, Clementi lived, performed, and studied at the estate in Dorset. During this period, it appears, Clementi spent eight hours a day at the harpsichord, practicing and studying the works of Johann Sebastian Bach, Carl Philipp Emanuel Bach, George Frideric Handel, Arcangelo Corelli, Domenico Scarlatti, Alessandro Scarlatti, and Bernardo Pasquini. His only compositions dated to this period are the Sonatas Op. 13 and 14 and the Sei Sonate per clavicembalo o pianoforte, Op. 1.

In 1770, Clementi made his first public performance as an organist. The audience was reported to be impressed with his playing, thus beginning one of the outstandingly successful concert pianist careers of the period.

In 1774, Clementi was freed from his obligations to Peter Beckford. During the winter of 1774–1775, he moved to London, making his first appearance as a harpsichordist in a benefit concert on 3 April 1775. He made several public appearances in London as a solo harpsichordist at benefit concerts for two local musicians, a singer and a harpist, and served as conductor (from the keyboard) at the King's Theatre (now His Majesty's Theatre), Haymarket, for at least part of this time.

=== Mozart ===
Clementi started a three-year European tour in 1780, traveling to Paris, where he performed for Queen Marie Antoinette; Munich, Germany; and Salzburg, Austria. In Vienna, he agreed to enter a musical contest with Mozart for the entertainment of Joseph II, Holy Roman Emperor and his guests on 24 December 1781, at the Viennese court. The composers were called upon to improvise and to perform selections from their own compositions. The Emperor diplomatically declared a tie.

On 12 January 1782, Mozart reported to his father: "Clementi plays well as far as execution with the right-hand goes. His greatest strength lies in his passages in 3rds. Apart from that, he has not a kreuzer's worth of taste or feeling—in short, he is a mere mechanic." In a subsequent letter, he wrote: "Clementi is a charlatan, like all Italians. He marks a piece presto but plays only allegro."

Clementi's impressions of Mozart, by contrast, were enthusiastic. Much later, the pianist Ludwig Berger recalled him saying of Mozart: "Until then I had never heard anyone play with such spirit and grace. I was particularly overwhelmed by an adagio and by several of his extempore variations for which the Emperor had chosen the theme, and which we were to devise alternately."

Despite later attempts to portray the two as rivals, there is no evidence that their meeting was not cordial. At the time, Clementi was exploring a more virtuosic and flamboyant style, and this might explain Mozart's disparaging attitude. One of the pieces he performed was his Op. 11 toccata, a display piece full of parallel thirds. It would appear that Mozart's opinion might later have changed somewhat. As noted by Hermann Abert in his 1920 biography W. A. Mozart, the set of variations K. 500 of 1786 "includes a handful of novel pianistic effects that are foreign to Mozart's earlier style and that clearly reflect the influence of Clementi".

Mozart used the opening motif of Clementi's B♭ major sonata (Op. 24, No. 2) in his overture for The Magic Flute. It was not unusual for composers to borrow from one another, and this might be considered a compliment. Though Clementi noted in subsequent publications of his sonata that it had been written ten years before Mozart's opera—presumably to make clear who was borrowing from whom—Clementi retained an admiration for Mozart, as reflected in the large number of transcriptions he made of Mozart's music, among which is a piano solo version of the Magic Flute overture.

=== Teaching ===
From 1783 and for the next twenty years, Clementi stayed in England, playing the piano, conducting, and teaching. Several of his students include Johann Baptist Cramer, Thomas Paul Chipp, Ignaz Moscheles, Therese Jansen Bartolozzi, Johann Nepomuk Hummel, Ludwig Berger (who went on to teach Felix Mendelssohn), and John Field (who, in turn, would become a major influence on Frédéric Chopin).

=== Publishing and piano manufacturing ===
In 1798, Clementi took over the firm Longman and Broderip at 26 Cheapside (then the most prestigious shopping street in London), initially with James Longman, who left in 1801. Clementi also had offices at 195 Tottenham Court Road from 1806. The publication line, "Clementi & Co, & Clementi, Cheapside" appears on a lithograph, "Music" by William Sharp after John Wood (1801–1870), circa 1830s.

Clementi also began manufacturing pianos, but on 20 March 1807, a fire destroyed the firm's warehouses in Rotten Road, resulting in a loss of about £40,000. That same year, Clementi made an agreement with Beethoven (one of his greatest admirers), which gave him full publishing rights to all of Beethoven's music in England. He copy edited and interpreted Beethoven's music but has received criticism for editorial work such as making harmonic "corrections" to some of Beethoven's scores.

In 1810, Clementi stopped performing in order to devote his time to composition and to piano making. On 24 January 1813, together with a group of prominent professional musicians in England, he founded the Philharmonic Society of London, which became the Royal Philharmonic Society in 1912. In 1813, Clementi was appointed a member of the Royal Swedish Academy of Music.

Meanwhile, his piano business had flourished, affording him an increasingly elegant lifestyle. As an inventor and skilled mechanic, he made important improvements in the construction of the piano, some of which have become standard.

=== Final years ===
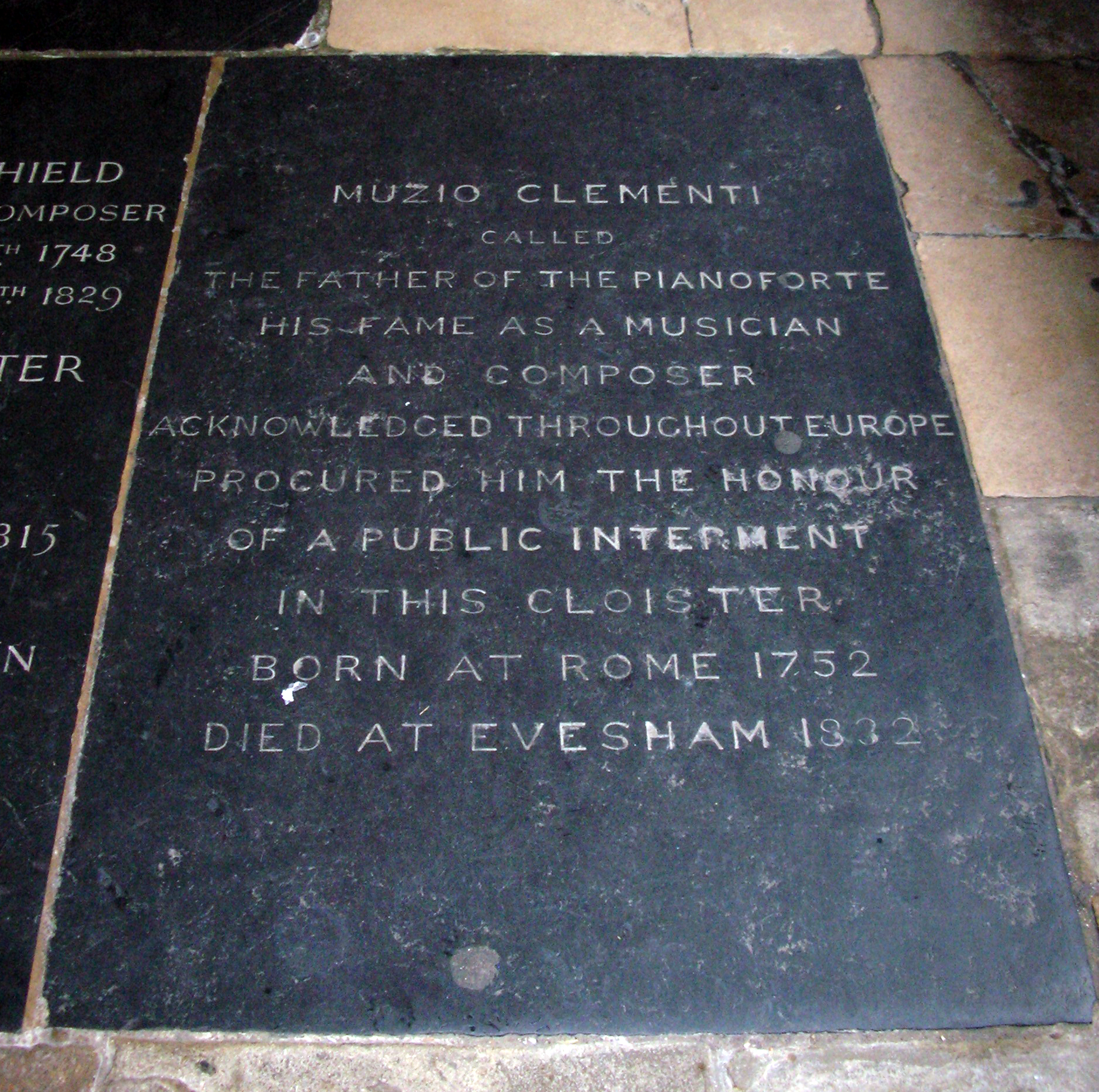
Ledger stone in Westminster Abbey

At the end of 1816, Clementi made another trip to the continent to introduce his new works, particularly at the Concerts Spirituels in Paris. He returned to London in June 1818, after stopping off in Frankfurt. In 1821, he once again returned to Paris, conducting his symphonies in Munich and Leipzig. In London in 1824, his symphonies were featured in five of the six programs at the 'Concerts of Ancient and Modern Music' at the King's Theatre.

In 1826, Clementi completed his collection of keyboard studies, Gradus ad Parnassum, and set off for Paris with the intention of publishing the third volume of the work simultaneously in Paris, London, and Leipzig. After staying in Baden and most likely making another visit to Italy, he returned to London in the autumn of 1827.

On 17 December 1827, a large banquet was organised by Johann Baptist Cramer and Ignaz Moscheles in his honour at the Hotel Albion. Moscheles, in his diary, says that on that occasion, Clementi improvised at the piano on a theme by George Frideric Handel. In 1828, he made his last public appearance at the opening concert of the Philharmonic Society. In 1830, he retired from the Society.

Clementi moved with his wife Emma (née Gisborne) and his family to the outskirts of Lichfield in Staffordshire and rented Lincroft House on the Earl of Lichfield's Estate from Lady Day 1828 until late 1831. He then moved to Evesham, where he died on 10 March 1832, after a short illness, aged eighty. On 29 March 1832, he was buried in the cloisters of Westminster Abbey. Accompanying his body were three of his students: Johann Baptist Cramer, John Field and Ignaz Moscheles.

=== Family ===
He had five children; by his first wife, Caroline (née Lehmann), he had a son who died soon after his birth; by his second wife Emma (née Gisborne), whom he married on 6 July 1811 in St Pancras Old Church, he had two sons and two daughters. Among his descendants are the British colonial administrators Sir Cecil Clementi Smith and Sir Cecil Clementi, Air Vice Marshal Cresswell Clementi of the RAF, Sir David Clementi who was a deputy governor of the Bank of England, and Marjorie Clementi (1927–1997), a pianist and piano teacher who became Professor of the Piano at the Royal Northern College of Music. Amongst his descendants in Italy was Rodolfo Graziani, Marshal of Italy and Viceroy of Italian Ethiopia in Fascist Italy, who was related to the composer via his mother, Adelia Clementi.

One son, the Rev. Vincent Mucius Clementi (1812-1899), a Church of England clergyman, emigrated to Peterborough County, Ontario, where he was incumbent of the Anglican church at Lakefield, Ontario. Two of his sons, Vincent Mutius Clementi (1835–72) and Theodore Bold Clementi (1837–1882), were Ontario Provincial Land Surveyors at Peterborough.

== Music ==
=== Piano works ===
As a composer of classical piano sonatas, Clementi was among the first to create keyboard works expressly for the capabilities of the piano. He has been called "Father of the Piano".

Of Clementi's playing in his youth, Moscheles wrote that it was "marked by a most beautiful legato, a supple touch in lively passages, and a most unfailing technique." Mozart may be said to have closed the old—and Clementi to have founded the newer school of technique on the piano.

6 Sonatinas for Piano, Op. 36, No. 1
I. Allegro (0:45)

II. Andante (1:21)

III. Vivace (0:34)

Clementi composed almost 110 piano sonatas. Some of the earlier and easier ones were later classified as sonatinas after the success of his Sonatinas Op. 36.

=== Symphonic works ===
Clementi's symphonies are less well known. Though many of his manuscripts have been lost, autograph portions of his unpublished symphonies, which include everything from sketches to complete movements, are in the Library of Congress and the British Library. From these autographs, scholars have been able to reconstruct four symphonies. Clementi also published two symphonies as Op. 18 in 1787, the first in B♭ major and the second in D major. Clementi successfully performed his symphonies in London and other cities in Europe, predominantly from 1813 to 1828. Based on performance reports, scholars estimate that he composed approximately twenty symphonies in total during his life. Clementi used the theme to "God Save the King" in his Symphony No. 3 in G major, often called the "Great National Symphony", catalogued as WoO 34.

In 2002, for the 250th anniversary of his birth, scholars published new research about Clementi's life and works. Ut Orpheus is publishing the 61-volume set of Clementi's complete works, which will include new editions of his symphonies.

=== Influence ===
Clementi's influence extended well into the 19th century, with composers using his sonatas as models for their keyboard compositions. Beethoven, in particular, had the highest regard for Clementi. Beethoven often played Clementi sonatas, and often a volume of them was on his music stand. Beethoven recommended these works to many people, including his nephew Karl. A description of Beethoven's regard for Clementi's music can be found in the testimony of his assistant, Anton Schindler, who wrote, "He [Beethoven] had the greatest admiration for these sonatas, considering them the most beautiful, the most pianistic of works, both for their lovely, pleasing, original melodies and for the consistent, easily followed form of each movement. The musical education of his beloved nephew was confined for many years almost exclusively to the playing of Clementi sonatas". Schindler continues with reference to Beethoven's fondness for Clementi's piano sonatas: "For these, he had the greatest preference and placed them in the front rank of pieces appropriate to the development of fine piano playing, as much for their lovely, pleasing, fresh melodies as for the well-knit, fluent forms of all the movements." Moscheles' edition of Schindler's biography quotes the latter as follows: "Among all the masters who have written for piano, Beethoven assigned to Clementi the very foremost rank. He considered his works excellent as studies for practice, for the formation of a pure taste, and as truly beautiful subjects for performance. Beethoven used to say: "They who thoroughly study Clementi, at the same time make themselves acquainted with Mozart and other composers; but the converse is not the fact.'"

Mozart, who wrote in a letter to his sister Marianne that he would prefer her not to play Clementi's sonatas due to their jumped runs and wide stretches and chords, which he thought might ruin the natural lightness of her hand.

Erik Satie, a contemporary of Claude Debussy, would later parody the Sonatina Op. 36, No. 1) in his Sonatine bureaucratique.

Carl Czerny also had the highest regard for Clementi's piano sonatas and used them successfully in his teaching of Franz Liszt. Czerny referred to Clementi as "the foremost pianist of his time."

Frédéric Chopin would often require his pupils to practise Clementi's preludes and exercises because of the exceptional virtues he attributed to them.

Vladimir Horowitz developed a special fondness for Clementi's work after his wife, Wanda Toscanini, bought him Clementi's complete works. He recorded five of Clementi's Sonatas along with shorter pieces.

By a ministerial decree dated 20 March 2008, the Opera Omnia of Muzio Clementi was promoted to the status of Italian National Edition. The steering committee of the National Edition consists of the scholars Andrea Coen (Rome); Roberto De Caro (Bologna, Italy), Roberto Illiano (Lucca—President); Leon Plantinga (New Haven, Connecticut, US); David Rowland (Milton Keynes, England), Luca Lévi Sala (Paris/Poitiers, Secretary, and Treasurer), Massimiliano Sala (Pistoia, Vice-President); Rohan H. Stewart-MacDonald (Cambridge, England); and Valeria Tarsetti (Bologna).
