= Bralos railway station =

Train station in Boeotia, Greece

Μπράλος Bralos
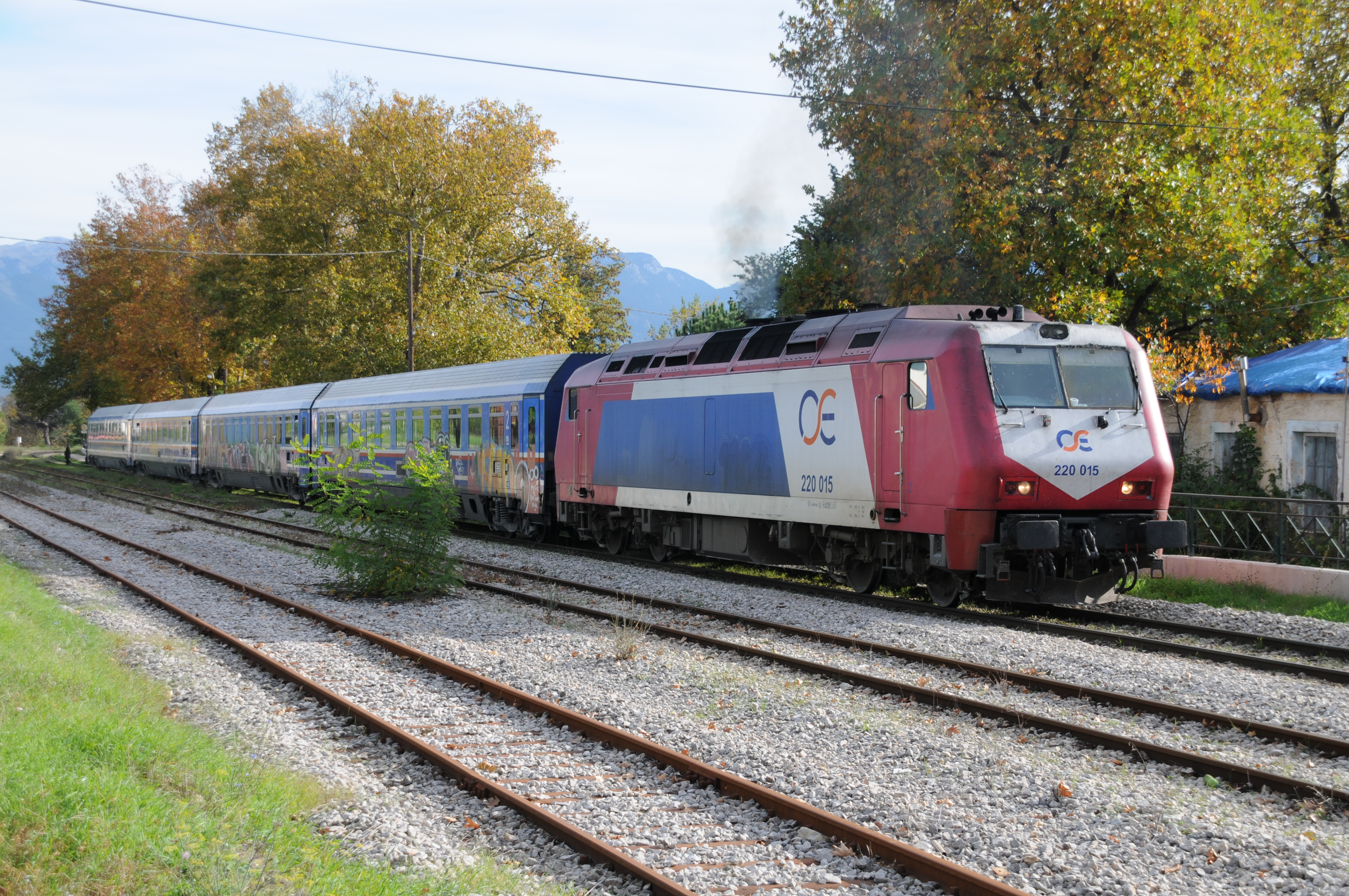
- OSE ADtranz class 220 loco on head of an IC train nonstopping service passing through Bralos station, November 2009.

General information
- Location: Bralos; Greece
- Coordinates: 38°42′08″N 22°27′28″E
- Owner: GAIAOSE
- Line: Piraeus–Platy railway (old)
- Platforms: 2
- Tracks: 3
- Train operators: Hellenic Train

Construction
- Structure type: at-grade
- Platform levels: 1
- Parking: No
- Cycle facilities: No

Other information
- Website: www.ose.gr/en

History
- Opened: 8 March 1904; 122 years ago
- Electrified: No
- Former names: Gravia (1939-1949)

Services
Preceding station	Hellenic Train	Following station
Lilaia towards Athens	G1 Athens-Leianokladi via Bralos	Gorgopotamos towards Leianokladi
Location
- Location within Greece

Bralos railway station (Greek: Σιδηροδρομικός Σταθμός Μπράλου, romanized: Sidirodromikós stathmós Bralou) is a railway station in Bralos, Greece. The station opened on 8 March 1904., along with the rest of the line. It is served by local stopping services to Tithorea and Leianokladi.

== History ==
The station opened on 8 March 1904, along with the rest of the railway line connecting Piraeus and Athens with the city of Larisa, a line that was later connected to the city of Thessaloniki. In 1917, the station became a crucial point of the Entente supply lines to the Macedonian Front, as the Allies used the Taranto to Itea (by boat) to Bralos (by road) and then the Bralos to Salonica railway line to send supplies to the Macedonian Front.

In 1920, Hellenic State Railways or SEK was established, and the Athens to Thessaloniki line became part of their network. In 1939, the station was renamed Gravia. During the Axis occupation of Greece (1941–44), Athens was controlled by German military forces, and the line was used for the transport of troops and weapons. During this period (and especially during the German withdrawal in 1944), the network in the area of Bralos was severely damaged by both the German army and Greek resistance groups (notably, Operation Harling).

On 12 January 1947, 300 guerrillas led by Captain Diamantis of the Democratic Army of Greece took the Bralos railway station by surprise at 14:00 local time, when the train pulled into the station. The guerrillas destroyed the radios, called on the passengers to get off the train, and separated the civilians from the soldiers. Captains Stathakopoulos, Nikolopoulos and gendarme Kastanas, who resisted the takeover, were killed in the ensuing exchange of gunfire. The guerrillas remained at the station for an hour and a half, blew up the chimney of the locomotive and set fire to the train, resulting in the burning of two wagons. They then left in cars, taking with them about 20 captives, various supplies and the station's cash register, and took refuge in the mountain of Oiti. Due to the civil war, the track and rolling stock took some time to replace, with normal service levels resumed around 1948.

In 1970, the Hellenic Railways Organisation S.A. or OSE became the legal successor to the SEK, taking over responsibilities for most of Greece's rail infrastructure. On 1 January 1971 the station, and most of the Greek rail infrastructure was transferred to OSE, a state-owned corporation. Freight traffic declined sharply when the state-imposed OSE monopoly for the transport of agricultural products and fertilisers ended in the early 1990s. Many small stations of the network with little passenger traffic were closed down. It was during this time that buslike shelters were installed on both platforms.

In 2001 the infrastructure element of OSE was created, known as GAIAOSE, which assumed responsibility for the maintenance of stations, bridges and other elements of the network, as well as the leasing and the sale of railway assists. In 2005, TrainOSE was created as a brand within OSE to concentrate on rail services and passenger interface. In 2009, with the Greek debt crisis unfolding, OSE's Management was forced to reduce services across the network. Timetables were cutback and routes closed, as the government-run entity attempted to reduce overheads. In 2017, OSE's passenger transport sector was privatised as TrainOSE, currently a wholly owned subsidiary of Ferrovie dello Stato Italiane; the infrastructure, including stations, remained under the control of OSE. The station closed on 10 February 2018 for major engineering works linked to the construction of the new high-speed line Athens-Thessaloniki, reopening in July 2018. In July 2022, the station began being served by Hellenic Train, the rebranded TranOSE

The Cultural Association of Brallo intends to establish a Folklore-Railway Museum hosted by an OSE wagon in the station.

== Facilities ==
The station is still housed in a 20th-century brick-built station building, but this is now disused. The station is currently (2022) not equipped with toilets or a staffed ticket office. Access to the platforms is via crossing the lines. At platform level, sheltered seating is available but there are no Dot-matrix display departure or arrival screens or timetable poster boards on any platforms. Currently, there is no local bus stop connecting the station.

== Services ==
It is served by local services between Tithorea and Leianokladi. The station sees around 2 trains per-day.

== Station layout ==
Level; L1	Side platform, doors will open on the right
Level; L1	Platform 1	towards Leianokladi (Gorgopotamos) ←
Level; L1	Platform 2	towards Tithorea (Lilaia) →
Level; L1	Side platform, doors will open on the right

== Gallery ==
Trains at the Parori and Bralos Pass in Winter, 2007.

== See also ==
- Railway stations in Greece
- Hellenic Railways Organization
- Hellenic Train
- P.A.Th.E./P.
