= Edmund Chipp =

English organist and composer (1823–1886)

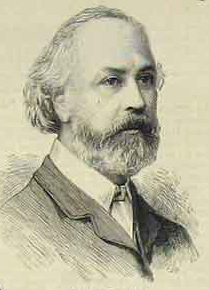
Edmund Chipp

Edmund Thomas Chipp (25 December 1823 – 17 December 1886) was an English organist and composer. His compositions were principally church organ music and oratorios.

== Life and career ==
Chipp was born in London on Christmas Day, 25 December 1823. He was the eldest son of musician (Thomas) Paul Chipp(1793–1870) harpist, principal drummer of his day and chorister of the Chapel Royal, Whitehall. He was educated in the Chapel Royal as a chorister, and later became a member of William IV's and then Queen Victoria's private band. He was a Chorister of the Chapel Royal under William Hawes from the age of seven until he was 17. On 28 June 1838 Chipp sang at the coronation of Queen Victoria.

Chipp studied the organ under George Cooper (organist at St Paul's Cathedral and St James's Palace d.1838), and violin. He became a Member of the Society of British Musicians in 1842 and of the Royal Society of Musicians in 1848. He was violinist in Her Majesty's Private Band from 1844, and a violinist in the Philharmonic and other orchestras.

In 1859 he obtained a music degree at Cambridge University and became Doctor of Music in 1861, the first to obtain this degree under the professorship of William Sterndale Bennett.

He died whilst on convalescent holiday in Nice, France on 17 December 1886. On Christmas Eve 1886 he was buried on the western side of Highgate Cemetery, in the Chipp family grave (plot no.3184).

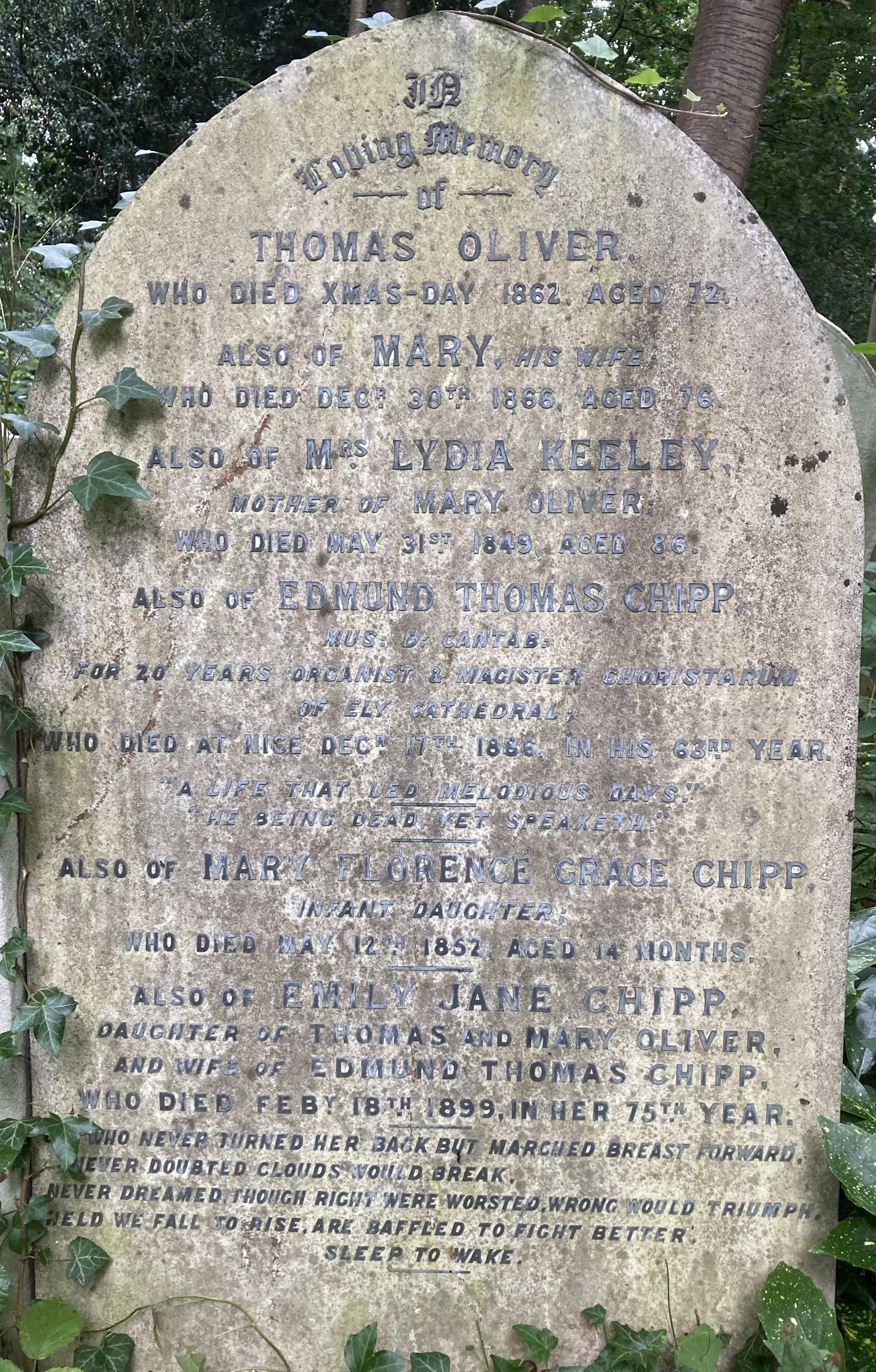
Family grave of Edmund Chipp in Highgate Cemetery

The Musical Times of 1 February 1887 stated: "In our last issue it was our painful duty to record the loss which the musical world sustained by the death of Dr E.T. Chipp," followed by his biography over two pages. This included reference to his work in demonstrating organs: "Mr Chipp's skill as an organist was by no means confined to his church duties; he was often called upon to display the resources of new organs. On these occasions he frequently performed the whole of his programme from memory."

== Organist ==
During his career, Chipp's appointments included:

- Organist at the Italian Opera House circa 1843–45.
- St. John's Chapel, Downside Hill, Hampstead, London 1846–46
- St. Olave's, Southwark, London 1847 succeeding "The Father of Church Music" Dr. Henry John Gauntlett (1805–1876). Gauntlett had designed a new grand organ for St Olaves, which was built between 1844 and 1846. Shortly after the installation was completed in March 1846, Chipp was formally invited to take up the position of organist. Chipp resigned in 1852 upon being appointed organist at St Mary-at-Hill.
- In 1862 the grand Ulster Hall opened in Belfast and Chipp was recruited to celebrate it.

"The opening of the Ulster Hall brought Belfast a capacious new concert auditorium and a musician of outstanding ability, Edmund Thomas Chipp, to play its organ and conduct the town's two principal musical societies." His appointment at Belfast was for 3 years, during which he gave many recitals; 57 in his first season, but conducting only 2 concertos, most notably in March 1864 of the Mendelssohn G Minor Piano Concerto. "This performance was to remain for many years the only piano concerto, and for that matter the only one by a composer of canonic status, to be played in the Ulster Hall."

- Ely Cathedral, 1867 Chief Organist and Magister Choristarum, held until his death in 1886.

== Chipp and the Mendelssohn organ sonatas ==
Mendelssohn's Six Grand Sonatas for the Organ, Op. 65 were published by Coventry and Hollier in July 1845. Chipp gave probably the first public performance of any of the sonatas just a few months later at Walker's organ factory in April 1846. In 1847 Chipp played the third sonata to Mendelssohn on the organ at the Hanover Square Rooms. This testimonial was received (the original draft was retrieved by Sir George Grove whilst researching Mendelssohn's life in Europe):

I have heard Mr. Edmund Chipp perform on the organ and the manner in which he played one of the most difficult of my Organ Sonatas has given me a very high opinion of his talents and his skill as a musician and as a performer. -London, 7th Mai, 1847. FELIX MENDELSSOHN BARTHOLDY

On 13 December 1848 Chipp performed all six of the Mendelssohn sonatas from memory, at a recital at the William Hill organ factory, a feat mentioned in several of his obituaries. Between 1850 and 1855 Chipp went on to collate and transcribe the full scores of all Mendelssohn's unpublished works in his own leisure time whilst he was a member of Her Majesty's Private Band at St George's Chapel at Windsor Castle.

== Compositions ==
=== For Organ ===
- Andante Varied
- Austrian Hymn
- Four Pieces 1: "O Sanctissima" with two variations and finale; 2: Andante con moto; 3: Intermezzo; 4: Fugue in A minor
- God Preserve the Emperor, written for The Birmingham Festival, 1849
- Twenty-four Sketches (Op. 11) (1: Andante Religioso; 2: In Memoriam M.F.G.C; 3: Con moto; 4: Adagio ma non troppo; 5: Con moto molto tranquillo; 6: Andante tranquillo; 7: Andante e molto Sostenuto; 8: Con moto ma non troppo presto; 9: Con moto molto tranquillo; 10: Canzonet; 11: Lento; 12: Pastorale; 13: In Memoriam F.M.B.; 14: Larghetto; 15: Moderato e Tranquillo; 16: Andante con Moto; 17: Moderato e Sostenuto; 18: Andante ma non troppo; 19: In Memoriam M.F.G.C.; 20: Grazioso; 21: Andante Maestoso e con energetico; 22: Moderato e legato; 23: Andante e Sostenuto; 24: Ave Maria)
- Variations on "God Preserve the Emperor" (Op. 2)
- Variations on "The Harmonious Blacksmith" (Op. 1)

=== Choral ===
- Job (1875)
- Naomi

Chipp compositions were included in the 2007 Historic Organ Sound Archive Project [HOSA] and National Pipe Organ Register.

== Sources ==
- Stephen, Leslie, ed. (1887). "Chipp, Edmund Thomas" . Dictionary of National Biography. Vol. 10. London: Smith, Elder & Co. pp. 258–9.
- Unsigned (February 1887). "Obituary: Edmund Thomas Chipp". The Musical Times and Singing Class Circular. 28 (528). Musical Times Publications Ltd.: 100–101. JSTOR 3360878.
- Edwards, F.G. (1895) Mendelssohn's Organ sonatas, Proceedings of the Musical Association, 21st session, 1894–5, pp. 1–16. London.
- Edwards, F.G. (1901). "Mendelssohn's Organ Sonatas". The Musical Times. 42 (106): 794–798.
- Scholes, Percy A. (1947). The Mirror of Music 1844–1944. A Century of Musical Life in Britain as Reflected in the Pages of the Musical Times. Vol. II. London & Oxford: Novello & Co. p. 596.

Cultural offices
Preceded by Robert Janes	Organist and Master of the Choristers of Ely Cathedral; 1867–1887	Succeeded by Basil Harwood
