= Kato Tithorea =

Town in Phthiotis, Greece

Kato Tithorea Κάτω Τιθορέα
- Community

- Location within Greece
- Coordinates: 38°36′N 22°43′E
- Country: Greece
- Administrative region: Central Greece
- Regional unit: Phthiotis
- Municipality: Amfikleia-Elateia
- Municipal unit: Tithorea

Population (2021)
  - Community: 1,453
- Time zone: UTC+2 (EET)
  - Summer (DST): UTC+3 (EEST)
- Vehicle registration: ΜΙ

Kato Tithorea (Greek: Κάτω Τιθορέα, Lower Tithorea) is a town in Phthiotis, in central Greece. Since the 2011 local government reform it is part of the municipality Amfikleia-Elateia, of which it is the seat. It has a population 1,841 according to the 2011 Greek census. It is situated on the right bank of the river Cephissus and between the Parnassus and Kallidromo mountains, 11 km east of Amfikleia and 24 km northwest of Livadeia. Nearby places includes Panagitsa (northeast), Agia Paraskevi (southeast) and Tithorea (southwest).

== Name ==
The town first appears in the modern era, as Καλύβια Τιθορέας (literally Tithorea Shacks). Between 1912 and 1955 the village was called Κηφισοχώριον (Kifisochorion), literally Village of Cephissus, in reference of the local river. The new name of Kato Tithorea, literally Lower Tithorea, was adopted on 11 May 1955 and is in reference to the nearby village of Tithorea, which traces its roots to the ancient Phocian town of the same name mentioned by Pausanias and Herodotus among others. Tithorea itself is, according to Pausanias, named after Tithorea, a tree nymph particularly associated with oaks.

== Transport ==
The town is served by the Tithorea railway station on the Piraeus–Platy railway, part of the main railway line connecting Athens and Thessaloniki, which opened in 1904. The station received a major refurbishment and upgrade in the 2016–2017 period as part of the Tithorea-Leianokladi-Domokos high-speed rail bypass, a 20-year project which starts at Kato Tithorea and includes the longest railway tunnel in the Balkans. The new bypass, which starts at Kato Tithorea and ends at Domokos, replaced the older mountainous part of the Piraeus–Platy railway line with an electrified line capable of speeds of up to 200 kilometres per hour (120 mph).

Kato Tithorea is also transversed by the old Greek National Road 3, a single carriageway which served as the main road link between Athens and Thessaloniki until the construction of what is now the A1 motorway in 1962.

== Notable people ==
- Filopimin Finos, the founder of Finos Film, a film production company that dominated the Greek film industry from 1943 to 1977
- Ioannis Grivas, President of the Court of Cassation and caretaker Prime Minister in 1989
