= Organ Sonatas (Mendelssohn) =

1845 compositions by Felix Mendelssohn

- by Felix Mendelssohn
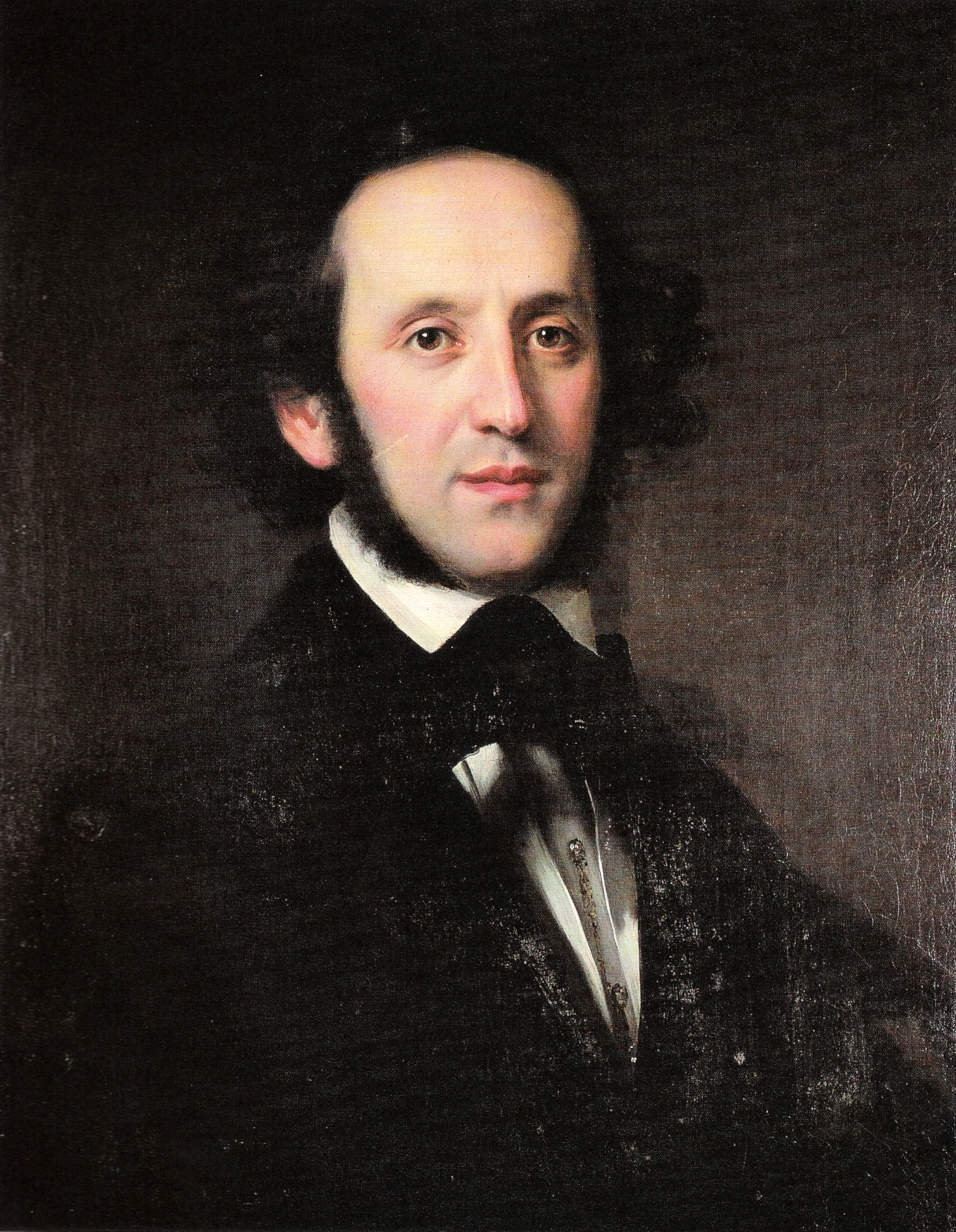
- Portrait of Mendelssohn by Eduard Magnus, 1846
- Opus: 65
- Composed: 1845
- Published: 1845 by Coventry and Hollier

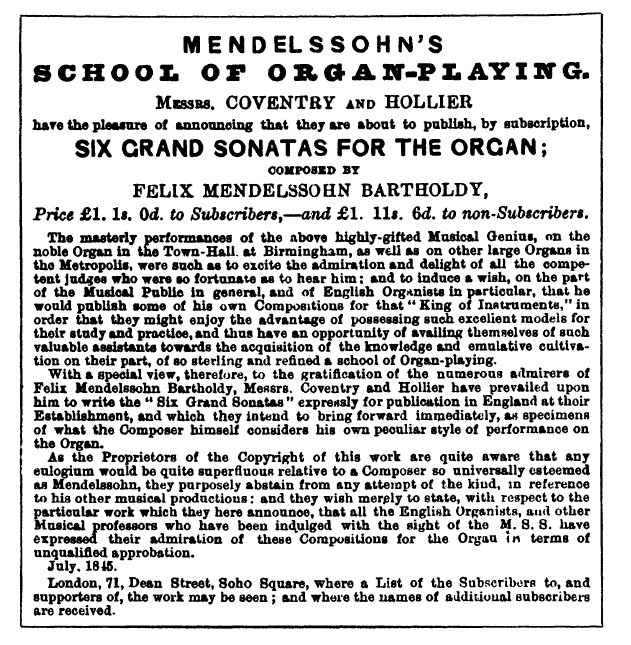
Advertisement for the Organ Sonatas in the Musical World, 24 July 1845

Felix Mendelssohn's six Organ Sonatas, Op. 65, were published in 1845. Mendelssohn's biographer Eric Werner has written of them: "Next to Bach's works, Mendelssohn's Organ Sonatas belong to the required repertory of all organists."

== Background ==
Mendelssohn was a skilled organist, and during his visits to Britain gave a number of well-received organ recitals. These often included the improvisations for which he was famous (e.g., at his recitals during his 1842 tour in London and Oxford). In an article in the magazine Musical World of 1838, the English organist Henry John Gauntlett noted:

His execution of Bach's music is transcendently great [...] His extempore playing is very diversified – the soft movements full of tenderness and expression, exquisitely beautiful and impassioned [...] In his loud preludes there are an endless variety of new ideas [....] and the pedal passages so novel and independent [...] as to take his auditor quite by surprise.

These qualities are evident in the organ sonatas, which were commissioned as a "set of voluntaries" by the English publishers Coventry and Hollier in 1844 (who also commissioned at the same time an edition by him of the organ chorales of J. S. Bach), and were published in 1845. Correspondence between Mendelssohn and Coventry relating to the Sonatas took place between August 1844 and May 1845. Mendelssohn suggested that Gauntlett undertake the proof reading, but this was in fact probably carried out by Vincent Novello. The publisher's original announcement referred to the work as "Mendelssohn's School of Organ-Playing" (see illustration), but this title was rescinded at the composer's request.

One-hundred ninety subscribers to the publication produced a sales income of £199/10/-. Mendelssohn himself received £60 from the publisher, equivalent to £6,300 in 2025. On this calculation, therefore, the price paid by each of the subscribers for the publication was equivalent in 2019 to £105.

== Music ==
Organ Sonatas
No. 1 in F minor

No. 2 in C minor

No. 3 in A major

No. 4 in B♭ major

No. 5 in D major

No. 6 in D minor
Performed by Wolfram Syré

In response to the commission, Mendelssohn at first drafted seven individual voluntaries, but then determined to extend and regroup them into a set of six sonatas, meaning by this not pieces in classical sonata form, but using the word as it had been used by Bach, for a collection or suite of varying pieces. The sonatas include references to a number of Lutheran chorales, and No. 3 incorporates a processional piece which Mendelssohn had begun writing for the wedding of his sister Fanny in 1829. No 4 was the last to be written.

The six sonatas are:

- No. 1 in F minor (Allegro – Adagio – Andante recitativo – Allegro assai vivace)
- No. 2 in C minor (Grave – Adagio – Allegro maestoso e vivace – Fugue: Allegro moderato)
- No. 3 in A major (based on Luther's chorale "Aus tiefer Not schrei ich zu dir") (Con moto maestoso – Andante tranquillo)
- No. 4 in B♭ major (Allegro con brio – Andante religioso – Allegretto – Allegro maestoso e vivace)
- No. 5 in D major (Andante – Andante con moto – Allegro)
- No. 6 in D minor (based on Luther's chorale "Vater unser im Himmelreich")** Contrary to what has been claimed for decades without any proof, this sonata is not about the chorale Vater unser vom Himmelreich. In his work "L'Allégorie de la caverne", Jacques Pichard offers arguments and a detailed analysis showing that the piece is built on Martin Moller's chorale "Nimm von uns Herr du treuer Gott". (Chorale and variations: Andante sostenuto – Allegro molto – Fuga – Finale: Andante)

== Reception ==
The Organ Sonatas demand good standards of pitch and touch from the organ and also a satisfactory pedalboard. Few English instruments were adequately equipped in these respects at the time, which probably explains the slow growth in interest in the pieces in Britain. Mendelssohn himself refused to play them when invited to do so at the Birmingham Festival of 1846, writing from Leipzig to his friend Ignaz Moscheles:

[T]he last time I passed through Birmingham the touch of the organ appeared to me so heavy that I could not venture to perform upon it in public. If however it is materially improved I shall be happy to play one of my sonatas; but I should not wish this to be announced before I had tried the organ myself.

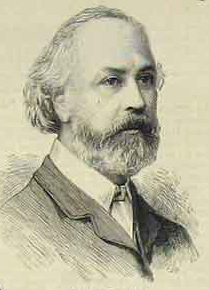
Edmund Chipp

The first public performance in Britain of any of the sonatas was probably given by Edmund Chipp in 1846; he also performed all six from memory in 1848. Although British critics rated the music highly, often drawing attention to its echoes of the composer's improvisatory style, Mendelssohn himself never performed any of the sonatas in public, either in England or elsewhere. He did play them privately to the English music critic William Rockstro during the latter's visit to Frankfurt am Main in 1845, and wrote to his sister Fanny Mendelssohn in 1845 offering to play them to her.

The sonatas were well received in other European countries, as they had been simultaneously published by Maurice Schlesinger in Paris, Ricordi in Milan, and Breitkopf & Härtel in Leipzig. Robert Schumann wrote to Mendelssohn in 1845 that he and his wife had played them over on the piano, and described them as "intensely poetical [...] what a perfect picture they form!" They are likely to have prompted Schumann's Six Fugues on B-A-C-H, and, later in the century, the organ sonatas of Josef Rheinberger.
