= Bralos =

Bralos Μπράλος
- Community
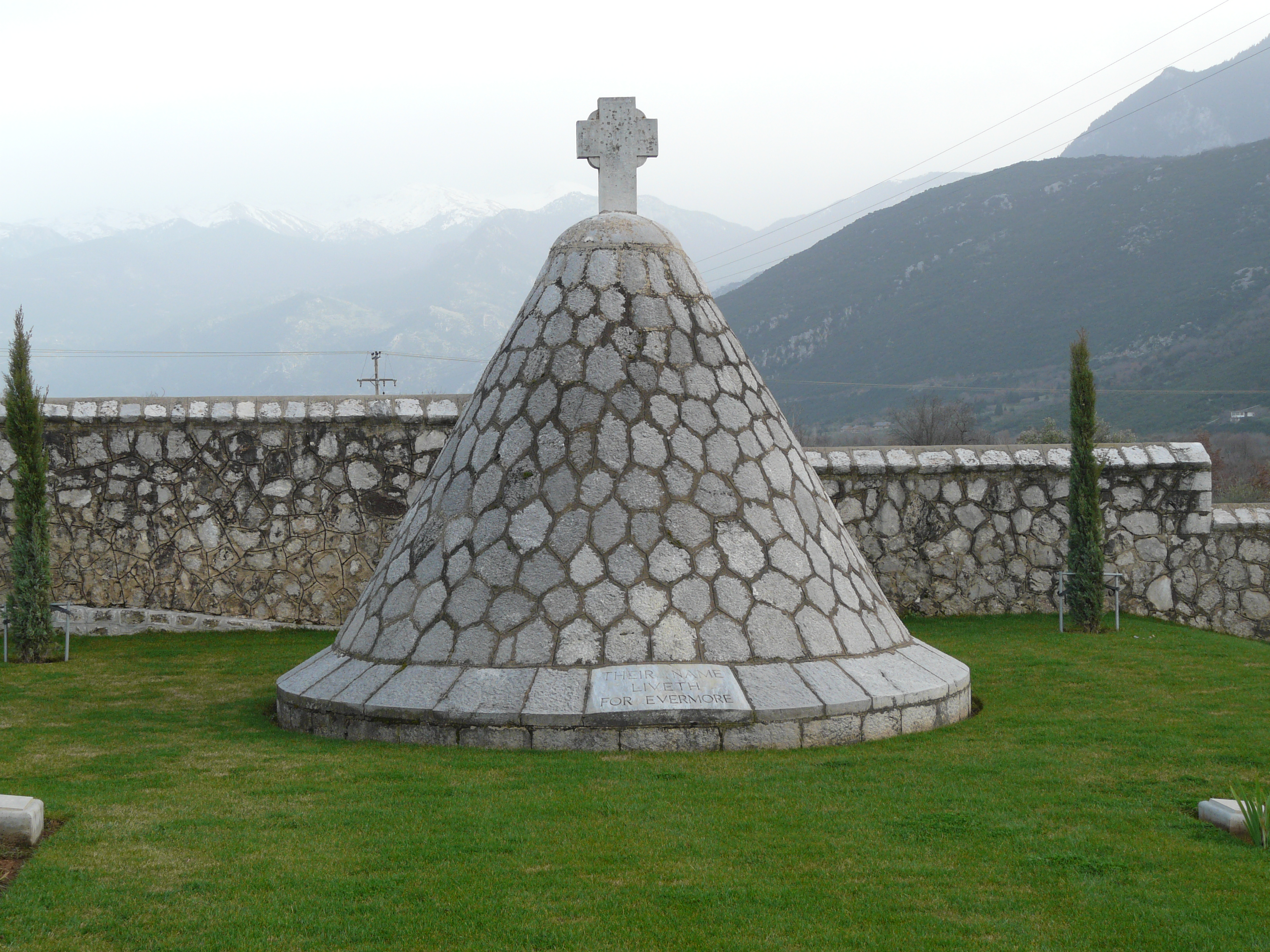
- British Military Cemetery, Bralos

- Location within Greece
- Coordinates: 38°44′N 22°28′E
- Country: Greece
- Administrative region: Central Greece
- Regional unit: Phthiotis
- Municipality: Amfikleia-Elateia
- Municipal unit: Amfikleia

Population (2021)
  - Community: 193
- Time zone: UTC+2 (EET)
  - Summer (DST): UTC+3 (EEST)
- Vehicle registration: ΜΙ

Bralos or Brallos (Greek: Μπράλ[λ]ος) is a village located on the slopes of Mount Kallidromon in Phthiotis, Greece. It is part of the municipality Amfikleia-Elateia. The town can be found along European route E65, and is served by Bralos railway station.

== History ==
In October 1917, during World War I, the 49th Stationary Hospital was established at Bralos along with rest and recuperation camps for Allied troops. It remained in use until April 1919. Many of the dead from the hospital—chiefly from the influenza epidemic—are buried in the Bralo British Cemetery. It contains 101 burials, 95 of which from the British Commonwealth.

Bralos was also the site of fighting between British Commonwealth troops and the Germans in the Battle of Thermopylae (1941).

On 12 January 1947, 300 Democratic Army of Greece guerrillas, led by Captain Diamantis, took the Bralos railway station by surprise at 14:00 local time, when the train pulled into the station. The guerrillas destroyed the radios, called on the passengers to get off the train, and separated the civilians from the soldiers. Captains Stathakopoulos, Nikolopoulos and gendarme Kastanas resisted the takeover, who were killed in the ensuing exchange of gunfire. The guerrillas sat at the station for an hour and a half, blew up the chimney of the locomotive and set fire to the train, resulting in the burning of two wagons. They then left in cars, taking with them about 20 captives, various supplies and the station's cash register, and took refuge in Oiti. Both the Army and Gendarmerie forces pursued them without result.

== Demographics ==
The following table includes the demographic development of Bralos settlement:

Census	1928	1940	1951	1961	1971	1981	1991	2001	2011
Population	741	466	322	243	176	157	298	175	114

== Transport ==
Trains at Parori and Bralos Pass in Winter.

=== Road ===
The town can be found along European route E65

=== Rail ===
The village is served by Bralos railway station, with local stopping services to Tithorea and Leianokladi.
