= Thomas Paul Chipp =

English harpist and composer

Thomas Paul Chipp (25 May 1793 – 19 June 1870) was an English harpist and composer.

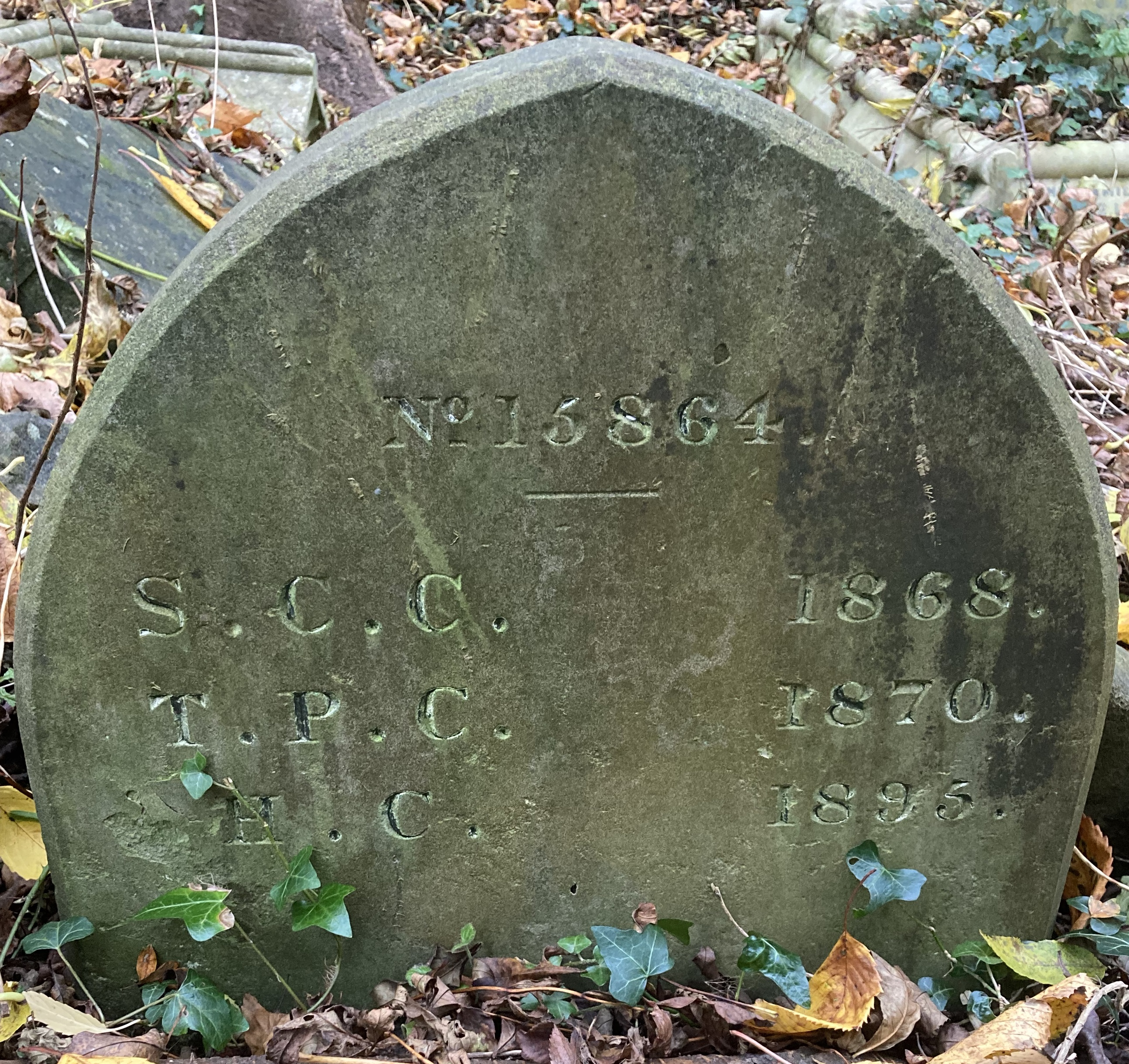
Grave of Thomas Paul Chipp in Highgate Cemetery

== Biography ==
Chipp was born in London in 1793, joining the choir of Westminster Abbey where he was taught the piano by Muzio Clementi. However, it was on the harp where he distinguished himself, writing many popular pieces, as well as longer compositions for other instruments including a trio for violin, viola, and cello (c.1820), a string quintet in E minor (1836), and a string quartet (1845).

Chipp joined Covent Garden Orchestra when he was 25 years old under Henry Bishop, moving to Her Majesty's Theatre a year later in 1826. In later life he was better known as a timpanist, playing for the New Philharmonic Society in 1852.

For over fifty years Chipp played in all the principal London orchestras, at three coronations (George IV, William IV, and Victoria) and at all the principal festivals. His last public appearance was in 1866 at the Worcester Festival. He died on 19 June 1870 in Camden Town, leaving two sons, Edmund, a composer and organist, and Horatio, a cellist. He was buried on the western side of Highgate Cemetery.

== Sources ==
- Squire, W., & Golby, D. Chipp, Thomas Paul (1793–1870), harpist and composer. Oxford Dictionary of National Biography. Retrieved 9 Feb. 2022, from https://www-oxforddnb-com.wikipedialibrary.idm.oclc.org/view/10.1093/ref:odnb/9780198614128.001.0001/odnb-9780198614128-e-5313
