= Monferrina =

Italian folk dance

Monferrina is a lively Italian folk dance in 6/8 time named after the place of its origin, Montferrat, in the Italian region of Piedmont. It has spread from Piedmont throughout Northern Italy, in Lombardy, Emilia-Romagna, Friuli-Venezia Giulia and even into Switzerland. It also became popular in late 18th-century England as a country dance, under the names monfrina, monfreda, and manfredina, being included in Wheatstone's Country Dances for 1810. In Piedmont, it is usually accompanied by singing and it is danced by several couples.

The dance goes under several different names: monferrina di Friuli, manfréṅna bulgnaiṡa, monfrénna mudnésa, giardiniera (or jardinière) and baragazzina.

== Execution and background ==
The dance starts with two circular promenades by couples arm-in-arm using a lively march step. The individual couples then join both hands for a cross-step with bent knees. The dance often contains bows and mimed teasing and coaxing.

Curt Sachs takes the two part structure of the dance, a procession followed by a couple figure, as indicative of its antiquity along with other Italian folk dances of this type such as the trescone, giga and bergamesco.
