= Gorgopotamos railway station =

Railway station in Greece

Γοργοπόταμος Gorgopotamos

General information
- Location: Epar.Od. Lamias-Pavlianis, Lamia 351 00, Gorgopotamos; Greece
- Owner: GAIAOSE
- Line: Piraeus–Platy railway (old)
- Platforms: 2
- Tracks: 2
- Train operators: Hellenic Train

Construction
- Structure type: at-grade
- Platform levels: 1
- Parking: No
- Cycle facilities: No

Other information
- Website: http://www.ose.gr/en/

History
- Opened: 8 March 1904
- Electrified: No

Services
Preceding station	Hellenic Train	Following station
Bralos towards Athens	G1 Athens-Leianokladi via Bralos	Leianokladi Terminus
Location
- Location within Greece

Gorgopotamos railway station (Greek: Σιδηροδρομικός σταθμός Γοργοποτάμου, romanized: Sidirodromikós stathmós Gorgopotámou) is a railway station situated between the Gorgopotamos Bridge and the village of Gorgopotamos. The station opened on 8 March 1904. It is served by local trains to Athens and Leianokladi. The old station buildings were located at the kilometer position 215 + 151 at an altitude of 93.75 meters The station is 2 hours and 49 minutes from Athens.

== History ==
The station opened on 8 March 1904.. In 1920 Hellenic State Railways or SEK was established, and the line became part of the network. During the Axis occupation of Greece (1941–44), Athens was controlled by German military forces, and the line used for the transport of troops and weapons.

On 25 November 1942, 150 Greek partisans, following plans drawn by E. C. W. "Eddie" Myers and assisted by a group of British SOE officers, blew up the railroad bridge over the Gorgopotamos river, cutting off the enemy-controlled route between Thessaloniki and Athens. The blast ruined two of the six piers of the bridge. During the occupation (and especially during the German withdrawal in 1944), the network was severely damaged by both the German army and Greek resistance groups. The track and rolling stock replacement took time following the civil war, with normal service levels resumed around 1948.

In 1970 OSE became the legal successor to the SEK, taking over responsibilities for most of Greece's rail infrastructure. On 1 January 1971 the station, and most of the Greek rail infrastructure were transferred to the Hellenic Railways Organisation S.A., a state-owned corporation. Freight traffic declined sharply when the state-imposed monopoly of OSE for the transport of agricultural products and fertilisers ended in the early 1990s. Many small stations of the network with little passenger traffic were closed down. In 1994 old railway station buildings were demolished.

In 2001 the infrastructure element of OSE was created, known as GAIAOSE; it would henceforth be responsible for the maintenance of stations, bridges and other elements of the network, as well as the leasing and the sale of railway assists. In 2005, TrainOSE was created as a brand within OSE to concentrate on rail services and passenger interface.

In 2006, the station was closed to daily passenger traffic, reopening seasonally, for excursion use, during the excursion of the Cultural Association of Bralo on 12 August 2018. OSE intends to operate annually on 25 November, the anniversary of the explosion of the Gorgopotamos Bridge.

On 10 February 2018, The historical Gorgopotamos Bridge stopped serving trains, putting an end to over a century of service; now, railway passengers from Athens heading north to Thessaloniki will not pass through the scenic Gorgopotamos bridge that connects Bralos mountain with Lamia.

In 2009, with the Greek debt crisis unfolding OSE's Management was forced to reduce services across the network. Timetables were cutback and routes closed, as the government-run entity attempted to reduce overheads. In 2017 OSE's passenger transport sector was privatised as TrainOSE (Now known as Hellenic Train), a wholly owned subsidiary of Ferrovie dello Stato Italiane infrastructure, including stations, remained under the control of OSE. On 20 May 2019 the station reopened as a request stop and serves the Tithoreas-Leianokladi. In July 2022, the station began being served by Hellenic Train, the rebranded TranOSE.

== Facilities ==
The station is little more than two side platforms, with no sheltered seating or other facilities. Currently, there is no local bus stop connecting the station.

== Services ==
It is served by Regional services between Athens and Leianokladi. The station sees around 2 trains per-day.

Level; L1	Side platform, doors will open on the right
Level; L1	Platform 1	towards Leianokladi (Terminus) ←
Level; L1	Platform 2	towards Athens (Bralos) →
Level; L1	Side platform, doors will open on the right
