= Amfikleia =

Town on Phthiotis, Greece

Amfikleia Αμφίκλεια
- Municipal unit
- Location within the regional unit

- Location within Greece
- Coordinates: 38°38′N 22°35′E
- Country: Greece
- Administrative region: Central Greece
- Regional unit: Phthiotis
- Municipality: Amfikleia-Elateia

Area
  - Municipal unit: 229.37 km^{2} (88.56 sq mi)
  - Community: 108.12 km^{2} (41.75 sq mi)

Population (2021)
  - Municipal unit: 2,996
  - Municipal unit density: 13.06/km^{2} (33.83/sq mi)
  - Community: 2,157
  - Community density: 19.95/km^{2} (51.67/sq mi)
- Time zone: UTC+2 (EET)
  - Summer (DST): UTC+3 (EEST)
- Vehicle registration: ΜΙ

Amfikleia (Greek: Αμφίκλεια, before 1915: Δαδί - Dadi) is a town and a former municipality in Phthiotis, Greece. Since the 2011 local government reform it is part of the municipality Amfikleia-Elateia, of which it is a municipal unit. The municipal unit has an area of 229.366 km^{2}, the community 108.124 km^{2}. At the 2021 census, the population of the municipal unit was 2,996 and of the community 2,157. The town is situated at the northern foot of Mount Parnassus, in the valley of the river Cephissus. It is 11 km northwest of Kato Tithorea and 31 km southeast of Lamia. Greek National Road 3 (Thebes - Lamia) passes through the town. The town is served by a railway station with connections on the Athens–Thessaloniki railway.

== Subdivisions ==
The municipal unit Amfikleia consists of the following communities:

- Amfikleia
- Bralos
- Drymaia
- Palaiochori
- Tithroni
- Xylikoi

== History ==
Amfikleia was named after the ancient town Amphicleia (Ancient Greek: Ἀμφίκλεια). Amphicleia was also named Amphicaea (Ἀμφίκαια) and Ophiteia (Ὀφιτεία). It was situated in the north of ancient Phocis. The Persians under Xerxes destroyed the city in 480 BC during the second Persian invasion of Greece. It was rebuilt afterwards, and at the time of Pausanias (2nd century AD), it was known for the worship of Dionysus.

During the Middle Ages, a tower was built on the site of the acropolis. Today the site is occupied by the cemetery.

Dadi, which was founded near the site of ancient Amphicleia, became a vibrant town; in early 19th century, William Leake reported 500 families living in the town. Dadi was renamed to Amfikleia in 1915.

== Notable people ==
- Athanasios Eftaxias (1849–1931), politician

== Gallery ==
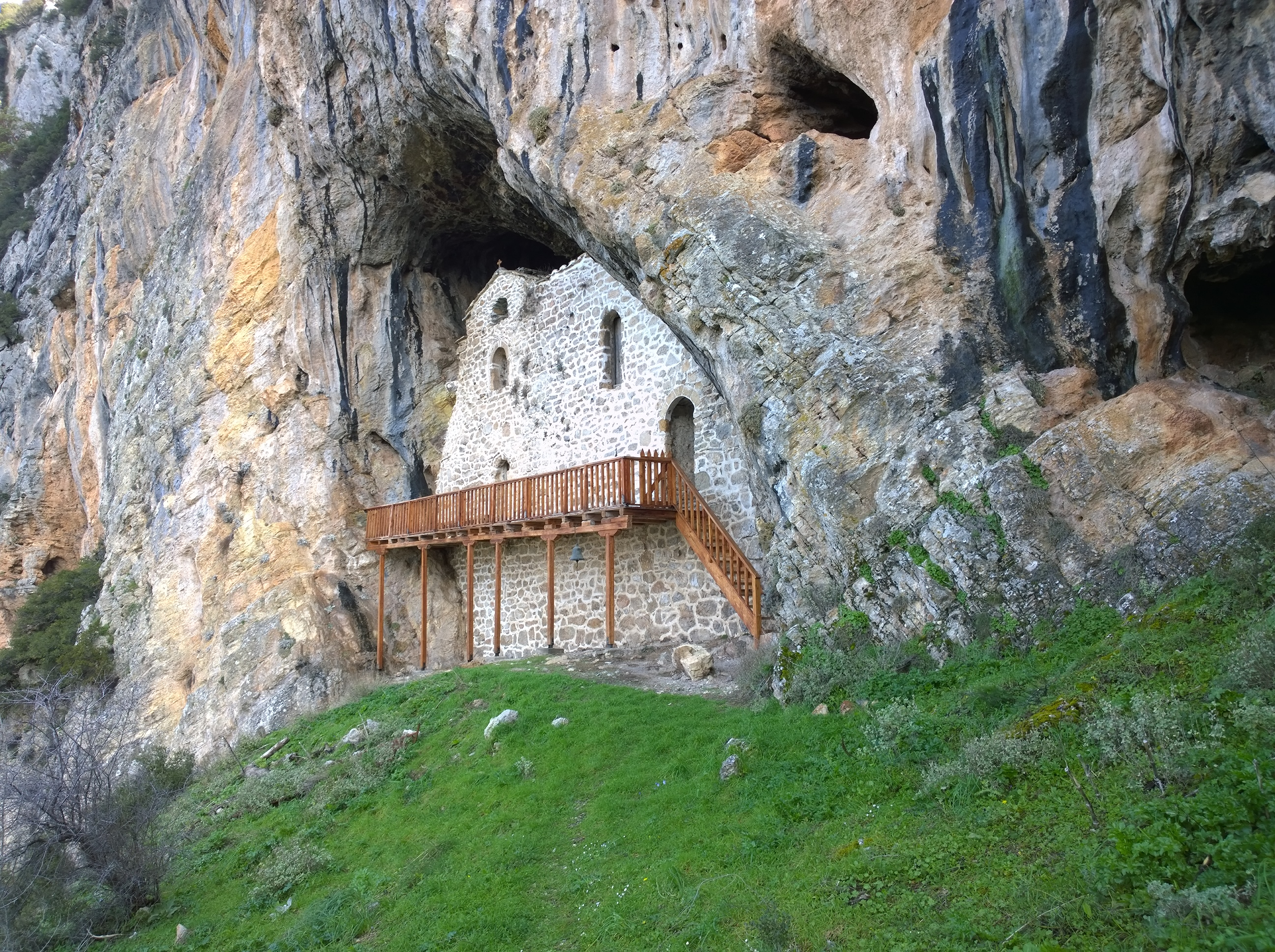
The church of Holy Jerusalem above Amfikleia

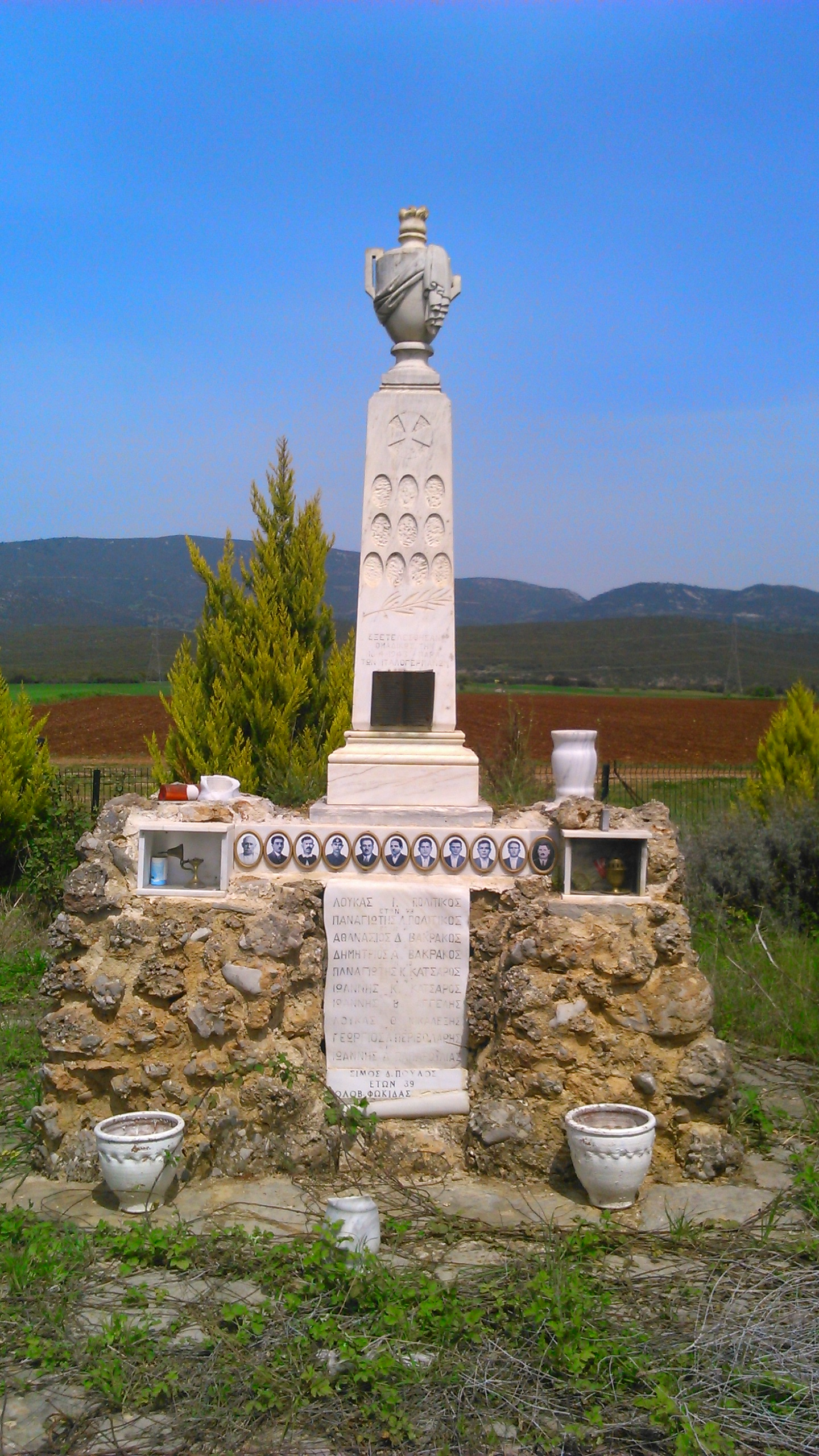
Memorial to the 11 inhabitants executed by the Germans in 1943 as reprisals for a sabotage attack on Amfikleia railway station

Position of Amfiklia municipal unit in Amfiklia-Elatia Municipality, Fthiotida Regional Unit Greece
