= Amfikleia-Elateia =

Amfikleia-Elateia Δήμος Αμφίκλειας-Ελάτειας
- Municipality
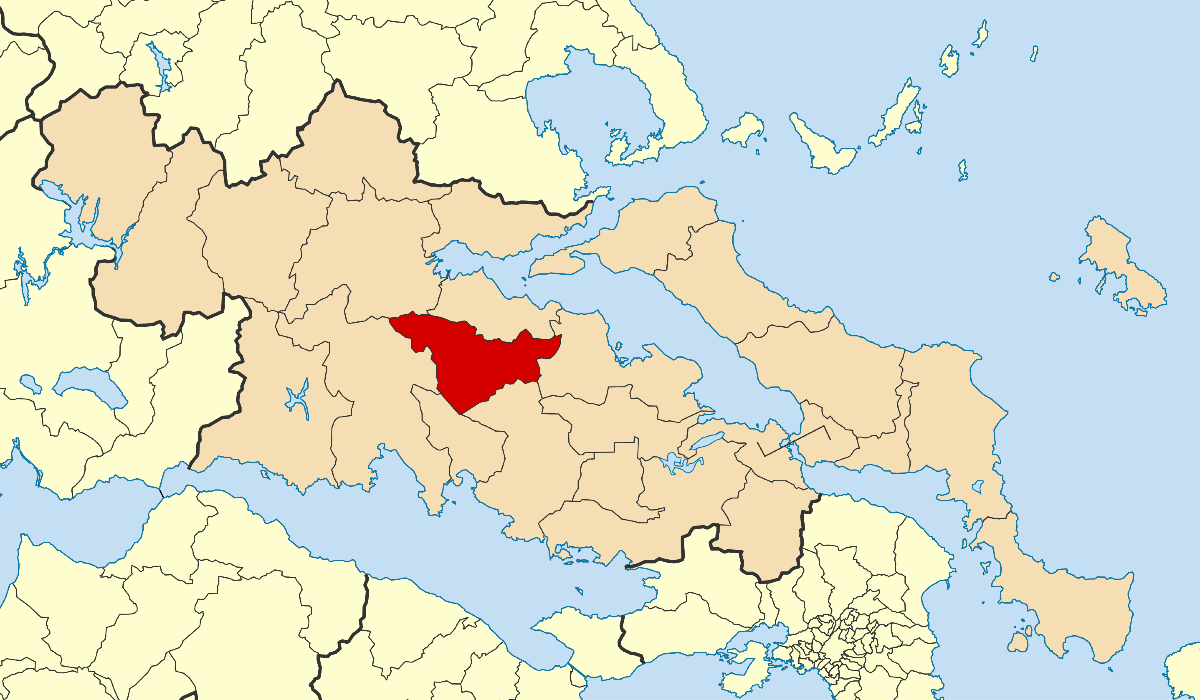

- Location within Greece
- Coordinates: 38°35′N 22°40′E
- Country: Greece
- Administrative region: Central Greece
- Regional unit: Phthiotis
- Seat: Kato Tithorea

Area
  - Municipality: 533.3 km^{2} (205.9 sq mi)

Population (2021)
  - Municipality: 8,376
  - Density: 15.71/km^{2} (40.68/sq mi)
- Time zone: UTC+2 (EET)
  - Summer (DST): UTC+3 (EEST)

Amfikleia–Elateia (Greek: Δήμος Αμφίκλειας-Ελάτειας) is a municipality in the Phthiotis regional unit, Central Greece, Greece. The seat of the municipality is the town of Kato Tithorea. The municipality has an area of 533.32 km^{2}.

== Municipality ==
The municipality of Amfikleia–Elateia was formed after the 2011 local administration reform by the merger of the following three former municipalities that became municipal units:

- Amfikleia
- Elateia
- Tithorea

== People ==
- Costa Cordalis (1944-2019), German-Greek singer
