= Tithorea =

Tithorea Τιθορέα
- Municipal unit
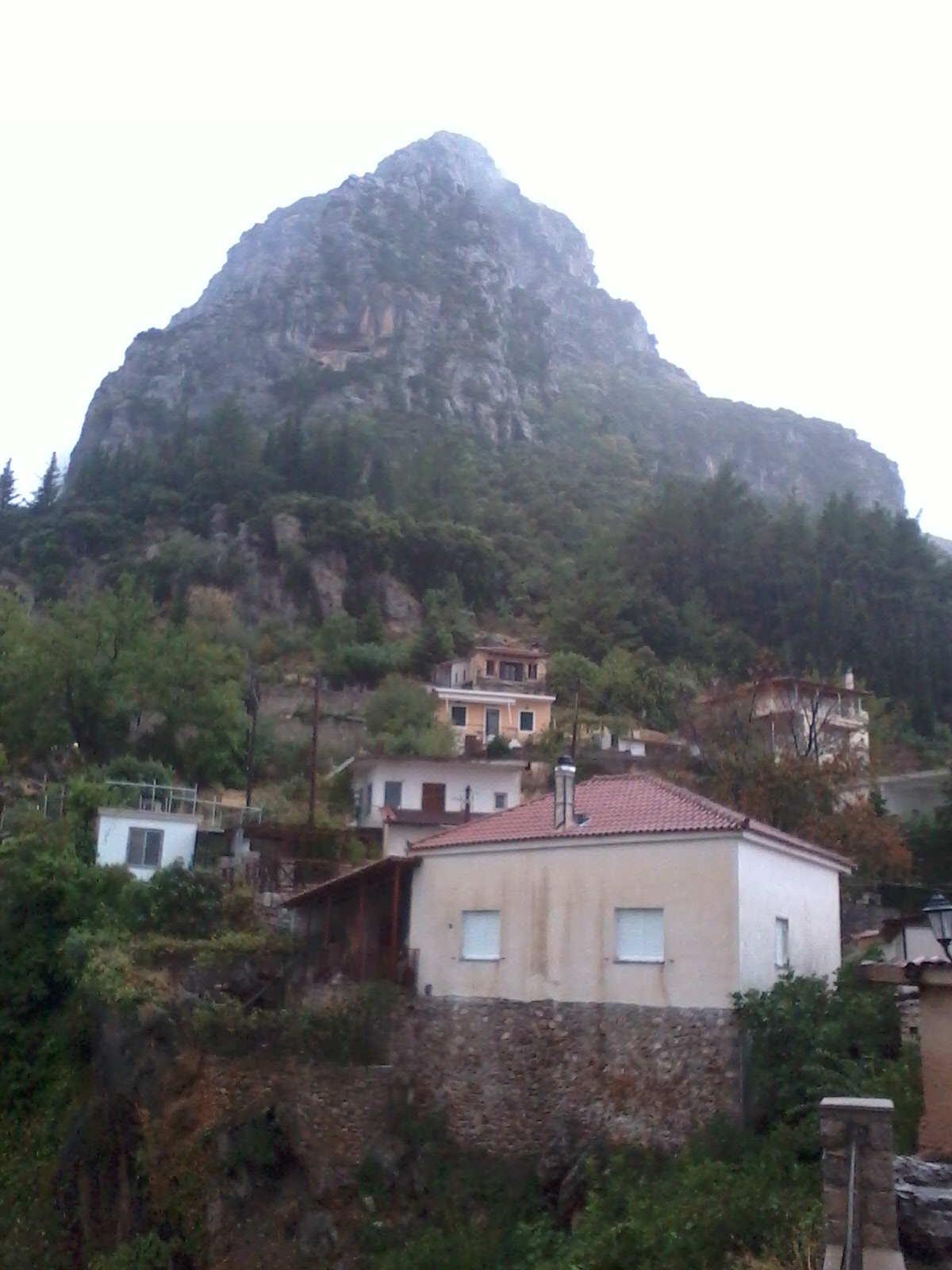
- View of Tithorea.

- Location within the regional unit

- Location within Greece
- Coordinates: 38°35′N 22°40′E
- Country: Greece
- Administrative region: Central Greece
- Regional unit: Phthiotis
- Municipality: Amfikleia-Elateia

Area
  - Municipal unit: 149.6 km^{2} (57.8 sq mi)

Population (2021)
  - Municipal unit: 2,576
  - Municipal unit density: 17.22/km^{2} (44.60/sq mi)
  - Community: 561
- Time zone: UTC+2 (EET)
  - Summer (DST): UTC+3 (EEST)
- Vehicle registration: ΜΙ

Tithorea (Greek: Τιθορέα), is an ancient place with more than 4,000 years of human history. A part of the municipality of Amfikleia-Elateia, in Phthiotis, Greece, it had a population of 561 in 2021, and is situated 156 km from Athens.

== Geography ==
Tithorea, located on the slopes of Mount Parnassus, the mountain was sacred to Dionysus and the Dionysian mysteries; it was also sacred to Apollo and the Corycian nymphs and was the home of the Muses.

Tithorea is situated at the northern foot of the Parnassus, 5 km from Tithorea Train Station, 90 minutes or 156 km from the country capital Athens. Tithorea (Velitsa) Ancient Phokis. Tithorea is about 180 stades distant from Delphi on the road across Parnassus. This road is not mountainous throughout, being fit even for vehicles, but was said to be several stades longer.

Tithorea, considered the birthplace of the Phocians, where about 2000 BC, Phocus and his wife Antiopi settled, where they lived and died and were buried. Tithorea (Neon), is the starting point and co-founders, along with other cities in the Boeotian Kifissos, Phocaea, a colony on the coast of Asia Minor, opposite Chios, under the Athenian Philogenes. Lampsacus was one of the first colonies in the Black Sea, Marseilles, Antipolis, Nicaea, Arelati (present-day Arles), Agathi, Hierapolis, Monoikos, present-day Monaco, present-day southern France, Elea in south Italy, Olvia in Sardinia and Kallipoli (Barcelona). The Tithorians, along with the other Phocians, were the only ones from the central and northern Greek states who did not get the side of the Persians when Xerxes marched against Greece and participated with a remarkable army in the battle of Thermopylae. Tithorea was the operational center of Onomarhos, born near Tithorea in the settlement of Parapotamioi, Emperor of the Phocians, the most powerful personality of Greece from 353 BC to 352 BC, where at that time it had occupied Thronio in Locri, subjugated Amfissa, conquered Doric Tetrapolis and Orchomenos. The Phocians King Onomarchos, led the entire Phocian army and invaded Thessaly twice (354-353 BC), where after an equal number of victories forced Philip to return to Macedonia, but Onomarchos in the third match, with the Macedonians had a fatal end to the battle that took place at Krokion Field near the Pagasitic Gulf, where the Phocian forces were defeated and the Onomarchos killed during the battle. Philip, in retaliation for the defeats suffered by the Phocians in 338 BC, conquered and leveled the Phocian cities.

It has been identified by 3d and 2d c. B.C. inscriptions, dated by the archon of Tithorea. Several refer to Isis, Serapis, and Anubis, recalling the sanctuary that Pausanias (10.32) said was the holiest of those built to Isis in Greece. Varying opinions have arisen from Herodotos' statement, that a number of Phocians fleeing Xerxes took refuge on the isolated peak of Tithorea, near Neon. Tithorea referring to the heights above the great cliff rising S of the village, later applied by extension to the whole district. Others, however, have supposed Tithorea was the refuge site, and that Neon is to be identified with the remains of a walled site of considerable size at Palia Pheva on the right bank of the Kephissos about 5 km to the N. Plutarch, described Tithorea as merely a fortress in the early 1st c. B.C. but of much greater importance a century later. It had declined again by the time of Pausanias, who saw a theater, an ancient market, a Temple and Grove of Athena, and the tomb of Antiope and Phocos. In the vicinity, there was also a Temple of Asklepios Archagetos (Founder). Scattered theater seats have been noted outside the walls as well as other foundations for large buildings. The most important remains are those of the fortifications, classed with Messene and Eleutherai as the finest examples of 4th c. work. The walls, supplementing the natural defenses of cliff to the S and gorge to the E, are of trapezoidal ashlar masonry, as much as 14 courses high. On the steep W slope, the top is both inclined and stepped, and crowned with coping blocks. The towers are square with windows and loopholes. Neon is listed by Pausanias as one of the Phocian towns razed in 346 B.C.; the walls were probably rebuilt soon after the battle of Chaironeia eight years later. The local olive oil was noted for color and sweetness and well known across Greece. In inscription stated that in Tithorea lived and died the famous Alexandrian medical doctor Dorotheos. In Diogenes Laertius, stated in his work "Lives of Philosophers", that Tithorea gave the birth to a philosopher, in the 4th century BC, which was called Theon the Tithoreus.

The people of Velitsa (Tithorea), took part, with a 47-member percussion group members, during the battle of Arachova on November 18 and 24, 1826, as well with a lower participation under Sergeant Vagenas and Athanasakos, at the exit of Messolonghi. In Velitsa (Tithorea), was the base of Odysseas Androutsos, hero of the Greek liberation, against Turkish. Tithorea was the origin of the admiral of independence, Russian army officer, Catherine the Great, Empress of Russia lover Lambros Katsonis.

Tithorea in the post-liberation period and prior to that name Velitsa, was established on 18.10.1835, as a settlement of the prefecture of Attica and Boeotia.During the German-Italian occupation, the Velitsiotes, along with the other villages, took part in one of the largest sabotages in central Greece, in Palavitsa, between Amfikleia-Tithorea, on April 16, 1943, which cost Rommel the supply, for 12 days and influenced the development of World War II.

After a few days, the Italian army entered Velitsa and the people of Velitsa paying for their brave act, a heavy blood cost. Velitsa (Tithorea) was looted, the village was burned, in retaliation for the sabotage in Palavitsa and by indiscriminately firing,

killed the people of Velitsa: Gazis Christos father's name Andreas, Kaperonis Ioannis fathe's Konstantinos, Trifylli Kalliopi of fatner's name Ioannis, Stafyla Panayiou and the teacher Yiannis Galanis.

The economy of Tithorea was predominantly tobacco-producing, livestock-based, with mills, a class of food merchants, shoemakers, barbers, tailors, craftsmen, builders and ironworkers. The Gymnasium of Tithorea operated for decades with students as Academician Georgios Sklavounos, the defence Minister Giannakitsas, during the period of the Balkan Wars, the founder of Finos Film, F. Finos, Deputy Minister of Agriculture of C. Triantafylou, Deputy President of court of auditors Ev. Gialouris. Tithorea is the place of origin of Stathis Giotas, former Minister the PASOK periods.

us),

The ancient city of Tithorea was built after the destruction of the nearby cities, including Neon, by Xerxes' Persian army in 480 BC. Ac.

A recent comparison of the genetic sample of Phocaeans and French from Provence and Corsica shows that one in ten men in southern France comes from colonized Greek Phocians, Phocaeans.According to Herodotus, inhabitants from ruined cities located on the banks of the Cephissus fled to the foot of the Parnassus around Tithorea. After the Persians left, the Phocians settled around Tithorea, where a fortress was built. The city reached its peak in the 3rd century BC, when it minted its own coins.

== Sites ==
Tithorea combines sites of multiple interests. Some of them are historical, spaning anywhere from antiquity to modern times. Others are of religious interest, and others are of natural interest.

The Kachalas gorge.

The ancient fortification of Tithorea stands inside the modern village, in nearly perfect condition. Its two remaining towers show the line of the ancient city: the first one stands in the middle of the modern village; and the second one (called by the locals kastraki, i.e. little castle) stands in the middle of the forest. The two towers are connected in most parts by the surviving walls.

The proto-byzantine church of Ayios Ioannis Theologos. The church holds important hagiographies and a mosaic. The mosaic is interrupted by holes, in which children were buried. The byzantine inscription outside the church reads that the temple is dedicated to children. Tithorea's Ayios Ioannis Theologos church is important because it proves the fusion of ancient Greek and Christian rituals. In some instances, children were buried near temples (see for example the children buried in pots, in the southern Greek ancient citadel of Messene).

Zosimas of Palestine and Mary of Egypt church, or simply among locals, "Avas Zosimas (Abbot Zosimas). The church, which is speculated to have been a sanctuary of Isis, since Tithorea has been a center of commerce. With the conversion to Christianity, the temple was converted to a sanctuary of equal theme: saints from the area of Egypt and Palestine. The wording Avas, which is very uncommon in modern Greek orthodox faith,shows a levantine origin. The basis of this cultural relic is the conquest of Tithorea by latin crusaders.

Saint Jerusalem church, locally known as Ayarsalì (a portmanteau deriving from ayìa Ierusalìm -st. Jerusalem). The church is yet another monument related to the crusaders. In the local faith, Ayarsalì was personified and venerated as a female saint, which of course is unrecognised. The church is built in a cave with a spring of water. Locals venerate Ayarsali every spring, when they organise a sprint competition called "the figs" (because the trophy was originally a quantity of figs); the competition ends with the ascending of mount Parnassus for a pilgrimage in the church.

Odysseas Androutsos' cave, called by the locals màvri trùpa, i.e. black hole. The cave was modified by the Greek revolutionary into a fortress. It remains a famous destination among hikers.

== Gallery ==
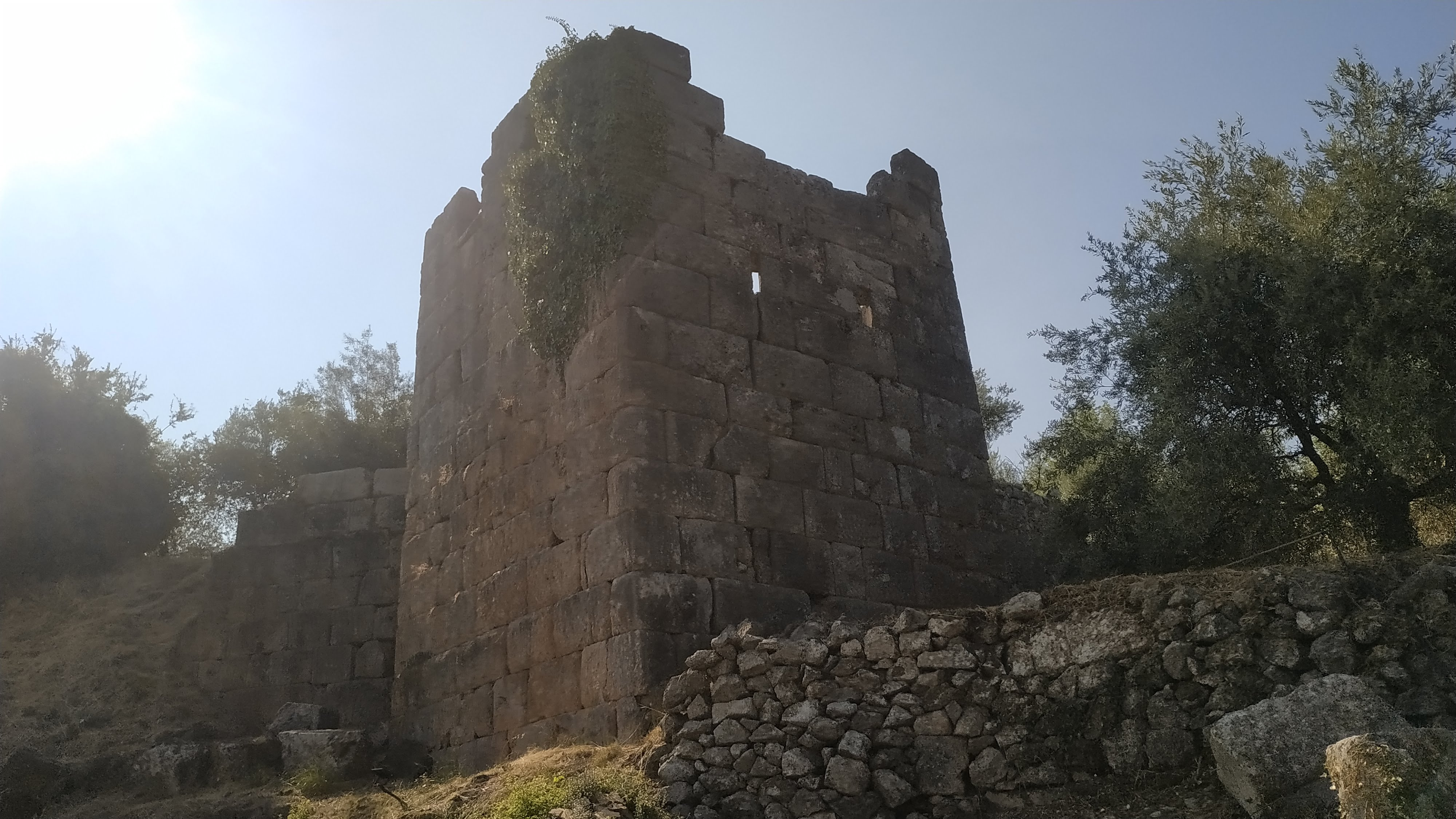
A fortification tower in Tithorea

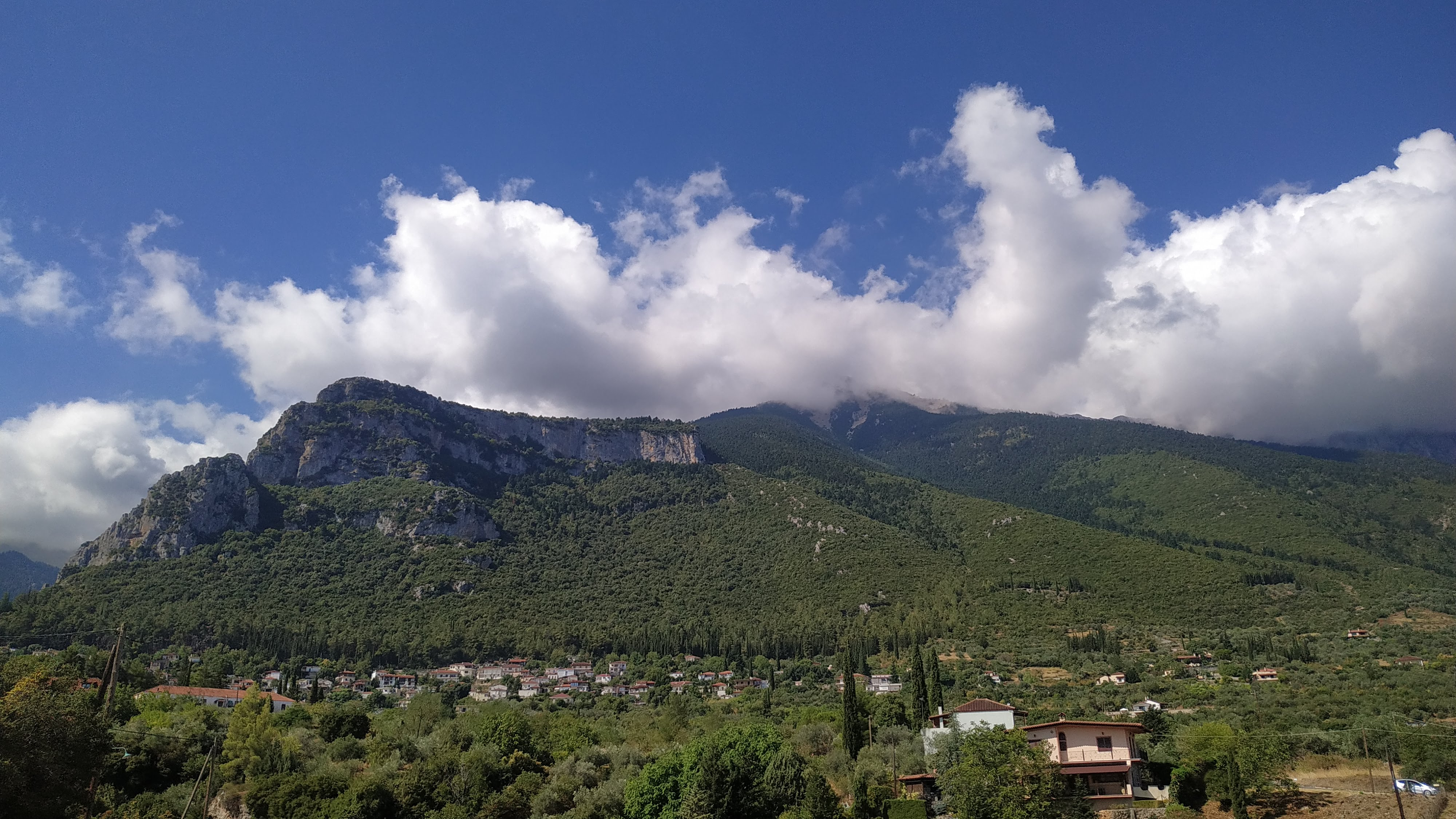
Tithorea on August 11, 2023

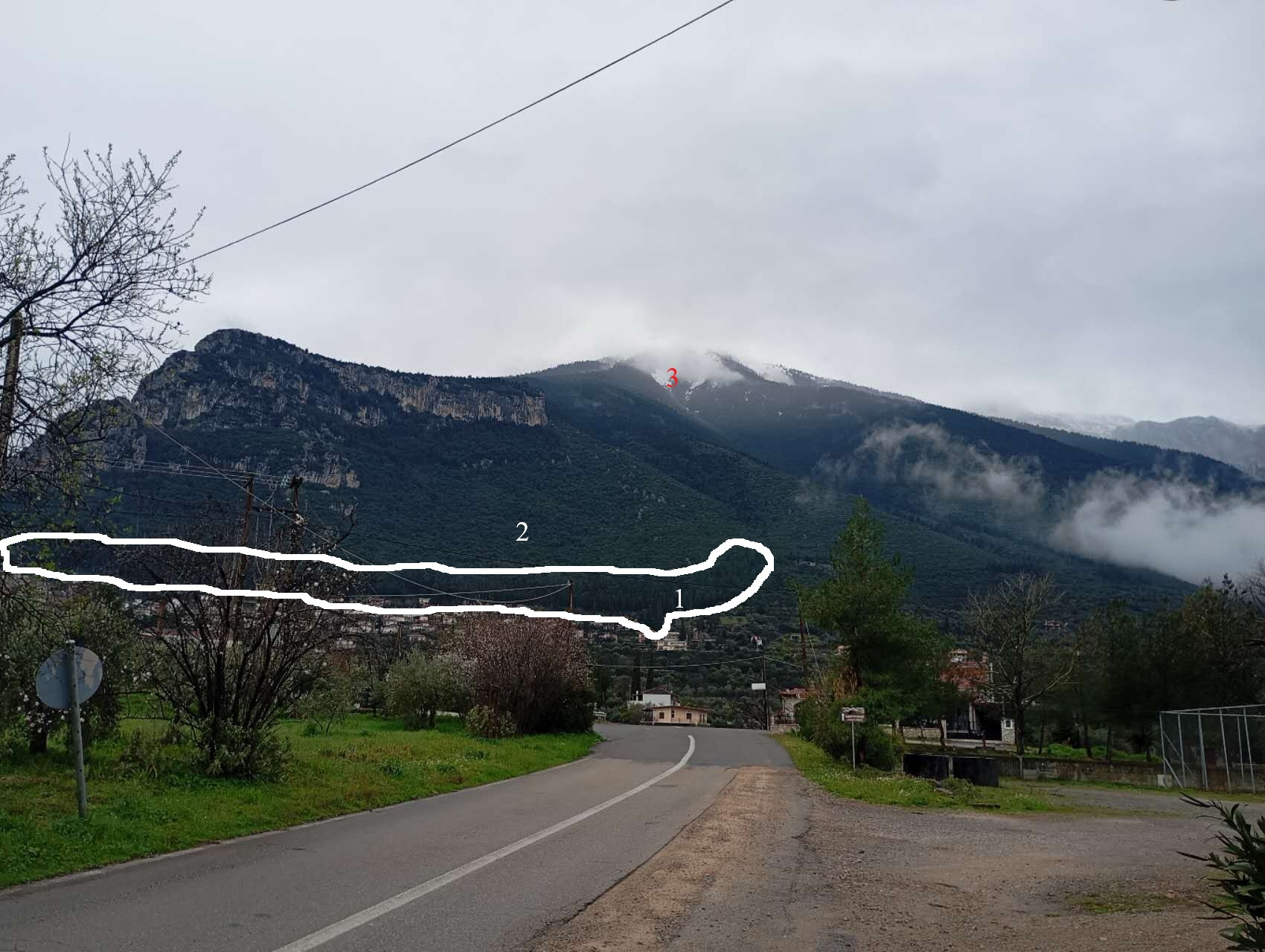
Aesthetic forest of Tithorea. 1: area of aesthetic forest, 2: endemic flora, 3: subalpic zone.
