= Locrian Greek =

Ancient Greek dialect of Central Greece

- Locric Greek
- Region: Locris
- Ethnicity: Locrians
- Extinct: (date missing)
- Language family: Indo-European: Hellenic; Greek; (disputed); Doric; Northwest Doric; Locrian Greek

Language codes
- ISO 639-3: –
- Linguist List: grc-loc
- Glottolog: None

Locrian Greek is an ancient Greek dialect that was spoken by the Locrians in Locris, Central Greece. It is a dialect of Northwest Greek. The Locrians were divided into two tribes, the Ozolian Locrians and the Opuntian Locrians, thus the Locrian dialect can be also divided in two branches, the Ozolian and Opuntian respectively. The traits of both dialects were described by Wilhelm Dittenberger, editor of the project Inscriptiones Graecae. Unlike some other Northwest varieties, that are not so well known from a dialectal point of view, Locrian, along with Phocian, is generally considered to be a well–attested and recognizable dialect.

== Orthography ==
Locrian Greek was written utilizing the West Greek alphabet, which represented "ξ" with "χ," "χ" with "," and lacked "." In Locrian and Arcadian, a unique sign "" was used to denote "ψ," which was represented in other West Greek dialects by "πσ" or "ϕσ." More archaic forms of the Greek alphabet persisted into 3rd-century BCE inscriptions amongst the Epizephyrian Locrians, a Locrian people inhabiting Magna Graecia, who utilized the letter "ψ" as numeral representing the number "1,000." The Epizephyrian Locrians, like various other cities of Magna Graecia, utilized the symbol "Ⱶ" to represent the phoneme voiceless glottal fricative, [h].

Some Locrian inscriptions represent double consonants utilizing only a single letter: "θάλασας" instead of "θάλασσας." However, there are certain instances in both consonants are present orthographically: "ἐν Ναύπακτον" and "ἐν Navπάκτοι" appear in one inscription, despite the presence of "ἐ Ναυπάκτο" and "ἐγ Ναυπάκτο" in the same text. In Locrian Greek, the preposition "ἐξ" was assimilated to all consonants, appearing orthographically merely as "ἐ" due to the omission of double consonants. Thus, "ἐ λιμένος" instead of "ἐλ λιμένος," itself instead of "ἐκ λιμένος." Locrian texts, like other Northwestern Greek dialects, often represent "-σθ" with "-στ" (Locrian "hελέσται" for Attic Greek "ἑλέσθαι"). According to Carl Darling Buck, this indicates that "θ" was, in some circumstances, pronounced as a fricative in Locrian, but had remained an aspirated silent letter in other positions, such as after "-σ."

Some Locrian terms bear the letter heta in certain circumstances and omit it in others: the Locrian word "πεντορκίαν," without heta, appears in the same inscription as "hορκόμότας" and "hόρκον." Buck proposes that these discrepancies indicate that the asper was so faintly sounded that it Locrian scribes often erroneously recorded the sound in their writings. This variation also occurs with the definite article: In two Locrian inscriptions from Oeantheia, dated to the first and second half of the 5th-century BCE respectively, the forms "ὁ" never appears with the letter heta, however "ἁ" appears once with and without the letter, suggesting that the rough breathing was likely lost or faintly sounded. One Locrian inscription from Oeantheia, dated to first half of the 5th-century BCE, extensively utilizes the letter "ϙ," although only before the forms "ρο" and "ο." However, a later inscription dated to the second half of the 5th-century BCE, also from Oeantheia, lacks the letter "ϙ."

== Morphology ==
One Locrian inscription from the first half of the 5th-century BCE represents long "ε with"ει" and long "ω" with "ον" in the genitive singular and "ο" in the accusative plural. However, a later inscription dated to the second half of the 5th-century BCE, also from Oeantheia, represents"ε" and "ω" with "ε" and "ο" respectively. One Locrian accusative singular form "ψάφιξξιν," presumably an inflected form of "ψάφιξξις," suggests that the substituted represented the ending "-σις" for "-ξις." The accusative singular ending "-έα" ending is attested in Locrian for nouns ending in "-ευς," although it is "-ῆ" in most Doric dialects. Moreover, Locrian forms such as "φάρειν" (Attic: "φέρειν"), "πατάρα," and "ἀνθάτροις" suggest that Locrian generally changed "ε" to "α" before "ρ." Ancient Greek grammarians often quote Doric genitive forms ending in "-εος," although Locrian provides the only inscriptional evidence of this morpheme: "κατά ϝέος." There is also attestation of a dative plural ending "-εσσι" instead of the Attic "-σι(ν)." One inscription from Naupaktos dated to around 500 BCE contains the form "πάντ̣εσιν" and another inscription dated to the 2nd-century BCE, during the Hellenistic period, contains the dative forms "χρη]μάτεσσι" and "Κεφαλλάνεσσι." Ozolian Locrian contained an athematic third declension dative plural form "-οις" (see terms such as "πάντοις " or "μειόνοις"), although this is unattested in Opuntian Locrian. The Ozolian Locrian term "παντεῖ" provides attestation of locative adverbs marked by the ending "-εῖ." Terms such as Epizephyrian Locrian "ὁπόκα" and Ozolian Locrian "τόκα" provide evidence of temporal adverbs denoted by "-κα." In Locrian, the preposition "κᾰτᾰ́" ("kătắ") is paired with the genitive in circumstances where the term governs the accusative in Attic, e.g. καθ'ὧν kath'ōn — καθ'ἅ kath'a. In most Greek dialects, the preposition "ἐπί" was used, in epitaphs, with the nominative of deceased individual, although—in Locrian—it was used with the dative. The definitive article shows the nominative plural endings "τοί" and "ταί" appear in Ozolian Locrian and Epizephyrian Locrian. There is attestation of Locrian patronymics with the ending "-ονδᾱς," which also appears in Thessalian, Euboean, and Boeotian. It is likely a corollary to the Boeotian form "-ωνδᾱς" and the Phocian and Euboean form "-ὠνδης."

Locrian dialects may have retained *-ti in verbal endings and numerals, as attested in Ozolian Locrian "έωντι" (compare Attic "ὦσι," both from Proto-Hellenic "*éhōnti") and the Epizephyrian Locrian "ίσατι" (compare Attic "οἶδε"). Ozolian Locrian terms such as "εξειμεν" and Epizephyrian Locrian terms such as "αποδομεν" attest to an athematic infinitive form "-μεν." The Epizephyrian Locrian term "εχρήσαμες" provides attestation of a first person plural ending "-μες," which appears in other Northwestern dialects such as Delphic. Third-person plural imperative forms may have been marked by the ending "-ντω," as attested by the Ozolian Locrian form "διαδόντω." The linguist Julián Dosuna reconstructs a middle-passive imperative form "*-νσθων" based upon the aforementioned evidence. Thematic third-person plural optative forms bear the ending "-οιεν" in early inscriptions, such as in the Ozolian Locrian term "κερδαίνοιεν;" however, inscriptions from the 2nd-century BCE onwards show the ending "-οιν," such as in the Ozolian Locrian and Delphic form "ποιέοιν." In Ozolian and Epizephyrian Locrian, the form "ανεθηκαν" shows that the morpheme "-κα-" appeared in the aorist plural of the verb "τῐ́θημῐ." Dosuna suggests that the optative may have carried a prescriptive force in Epizephyrian Locrian, citing the phrase "ἀνθείη τᾶι θεῶι δυωδεκαπλόα," which Dosuna translates as "let her dedicate to the goddess a sum twelve times their value". There is attestation of the 3rd person plural ending in Opuntian Locrian: The form "ἀνέθεαν" (Attic: "ἔθεσαν") appears in an Opuntian inscription from Halae. It is possible that this form emerged due to influence from the Boeotian dialect.

The Ozolian Locrian middle participle form "ἐνκαλείμενος" shows the ending "-ειμενος" where Attic Greek shows "-εομενος." However, the Epizephyrian Locrians showcase a form "πωλήμενος." The linguist Vit Bubenik considers this evidence that the Ozolian Locrians belonged to a "Doris media" ("Middle Doric") class whereas the Epizephyrian Locrians belonged to a "Doris severior" ("Strict Doric") class. The "Strict Doric" class included dialects such as Laconian or Messenian and used a system of five long-vowels, unlike the "Middle Doric" class, which also used the five long-vowel system but bore additional, diverging vowels. Locrian may have contracted the forms "-αε," "-αη," "-ᾱε," and "-αει" to "-η:" Compare Ozolian Locrian "νικην" to Attic "νῑκᾶν." Furthermore, Locrian may have contracted "-ᾱω" and "-ᾱο" to "ᾱ:" Compare Epizephyrian Locrian "ἀμάρα" to Attic "ἡμέρα." It is also likely that Locrian contracted "-ῳ" to "-οι;" thus, Ozolian Locrian "τοῖ Απόλλωνι" instead of Attic "τῷ Ἀπόλλωνῐ." However, the Epizephyrian Locrians contracted the dative singular form "-ῷ" to "ω." Epizephyrian Locrian also likely merged open and close-mid vowels together, leading the forms such as "Ἡρακλήτω" or "βωλά" instead of Attic "Ἡράκλειτος" and "βουλή." Dosuna proposes that this development likely occurred due to the influence of nearby "Strict Doric" dialects. Terms such "ϝετέων" and "[στρ]ατᾱγέοντ[ο]ς," both found in two separate Locrian inscriptions from Naupaktos dated to around 500 BCE and the 3rd-century BCE respectively, indicate that the phoneme /eo/ was uncontracted in Locrian, unlike Attic. One inscription dated to the 2nd-century BCE from the Opuntian Locrian city of Opous shows the forms "Θρασυμήδευς" (Attic: "Θρασυμήδεος") and "Θειοκλῆς" (Attic: "Θεοκλῆς") and another inscription from the same city shows the genitive ending "-κλεῖος" for names ending in "-κλῆς." This irregularity is unattested outside of these inscriptions and is contradicted by other evidence from the same city which conforms to the aforementioned rules. It is possible that this peculiarity emerged due to influence from the neighboring Boeotian dialect. The German scholar Wolfgang Blümel suggested that, in this scenario, the spelling "ευ" may represent the realizations [iu] or [io].

== Ozolian Locrian ==
- The adjective διπλειός dipleios instead of διπλοῦς diplous
- The assimilation of κ (k) in the preposition ἐκ ek with the first consonant of the next word, e.g. ἐλ λιμένος e(l) limenos — ἐκ λιμένος ek limenos

== Opuntian Locrian ==
- The infinitive in -εν (-en) instead of -ειν (-ein), e.g. ἀναγράφεν anagraphen — ἀναγράφειν anagraphein
- The patronymic names are according to the name they define, an Aeolic trait, e.g. Δαναΐς Νικοτελεία Danais Nikoteleia — Δαναΐς Νικοτέλους Danais Nikotelous

== Glossary ==
- δείλομαι deilomai will, want (Locrian and Delphian) (Attic boulomai) (Coan dêlomai) (Doric bôlomai) (Thessalian bellomai)
- ϝέρρω Werrô go away (Attic errô) (Hsch. berrês fugitive, berreuô escape)
- Ϝεσπάριοι Λοϟροὶ Wesparioi Lokroi Epizephyrian (Western) Locrians in Calabria (Attic hesperios of the evening, western, Doric wesperios) (cf. Latin Vesper) IG IX,1^{2} 3:718
- Λοϟροὶ τοὶ ͱυποκναμίδιοι Lokroi toi hypoknamidioi (Attic Lokroi hoi hypoknemidioi) Hypoknemidian Locrians; under mount Knemis IG IX,1^{2} 3:718
- ὀπλίαι opliai places where the Locrians counted their cattle

== See also ==
- Doric Greek
- Kollyra curse tablet
