= Olympian 9 =

Olympian 9, 'For Epharmostus of Opus', is an ode by the 5th century BC Greek poet Pindar.

== Background ==
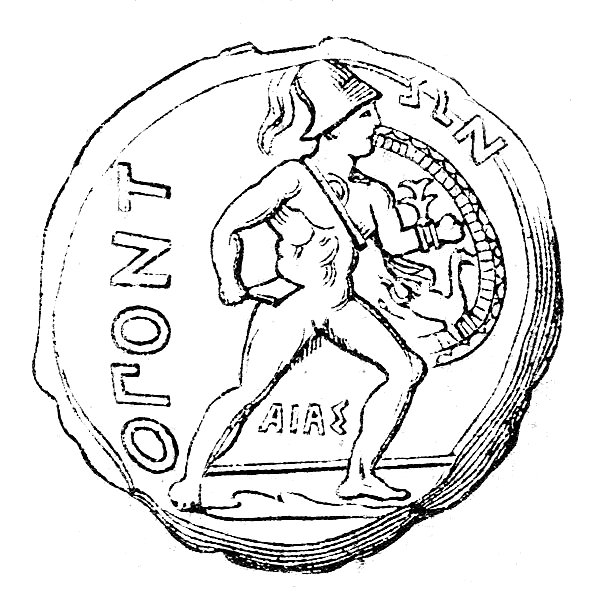
Coin of Opus. Aias Oiliades

Epharmostus the Opuntian, victor in the wrestling-ring in 468 BC, was subsequently successful in the Pythian games, in a year stated by the Scholiast, in most of the MSS, to be the 30th Pythiad, which, as the Pythian era is ascertained to have begun in 582 BC, corresponds to 466 BC. The date of his present Olympic victory is 468. This is determined by the Oxyrhynchus papyrus, which names as victor in that year [Εφα]ρμοστος οπου[ντοιοςπ]αλην.

The victor belongs to Opus, a town of the Eastern Locrians, in the district North of Boeotia. He is a friend or kinsman of a proxenus of Thebes (84). Deucalion and Pyrrha were supposed to have dwelt in the neighbourhood of Opus, and the town was said to have been founded by Opus, son of Locrus and Protogeneia. It was the native city of Patroclus, and was one of the Locrian towns subject to Ajax, son of Oileus.

== Summary ==
The brief chant of Archilochus sufficed for the immediate welcome of the victor at Olympia; but now the Muses themselves must shoot their arrows at the hill of Cronus, with one more arrow aimed at Pytho (1–12). Not in vain is the praise of Opus and her son, whose home is renowned for Law and Justice, and for Pythian and Olympian victories (13–21). The poet will spread its fame far and wide, for the Graces of song are bound to give delight; but song, no less than strength, depends on Heaven (21–29). Without the help of Heaven how could Heracles have withstood the gods at Pylos? (29–35). But it is folly to speak of the gods as matched in war, and madness to boast of a poet's song (35–39). Strife must not be named in the same breath as the immortals (40 f).

Rather let me tell anew the tale of Opus, the city of Protogeneia, where Pyrrha and Deucalion made men from stones (41–47). Praise wine that is old, but lays that are new (48 f).

Then follows the story of the flood, and the myth of the eponymous hero of Opus, his friendship with Menoetius, whose son, Patroclus, was the friend of Achilles (41–79).

The poet prays that the Muses may inspire him to sing the three victories already won by Epharmostus and his friend at the Isthmus and at Nemea, and by Epharmostus alone at Nemea and elsewhere (80–99). That which comes by Nature and is the gift of God is the best; men's pursuits are very various, and all men have not the same training. The heights of skill are steep; but in offering this triumphal song, the poet loudly declares that, by the gift of God, this victor in the wrestling is dexterous and nimble, and has the glance of valour in his eyes, and has, on this festal day, cast a new crown upon the altar of Ajax, the son of Oileus (100–112).

== Sources ==
- Grenfell, Bernard P., ed. (1899). The Oxyrhynchus Papyri. Vol. 2. Oxford: Oxford University Press. p. 89.

Attribution:

- Sandys, John, ed. (1915). The Odes of Pindar, including the Principal Fragments. Loeb Classical Library. New York: The Macmillan Co. pp. 94–107.
