= Opus (mythology) =

In Greek mythology, Opus (Ancient Greek: Ὀπόεις) may refer to the following characters:

- Opus I, king of the Epeians and son of Zeus by Protogeneia, daughter of Deucalion. Opus was the father of Cambyse or Protogeneia who was carried off by Zeus to Mt. Maenalus in Arcadia where she bore a son, the below Opus who was then adopted by Locrus as his own child, for the latter was barren.
- Opus II, son of Locrus or Zeus by Cabya or Cambyse and thus a grandson of Opus I. From him, a portion of the Locris derived their name Opuntii. Locrus gave Opus a city and a people to govern and strangers came to him from Argos, Thebes, Arcadia and Pisa. But among the settlers, he chiefly honored the son of Actor and Aegina, Menoetius who became the father of Patroclus. In some accounts, after a quarrel between Opus and his father Locrus, the former took a great number of the citizens with him and went to seek an oracle about transplanting a new colony. The oracle told him to build a city where he should chance to be bitten by a wooden dog, and as he was crossing to the other sea, Opus trod upon a cynosbatus (a sweet brier). Greatly troubled by the wound, he spent several days there, during which he explored the country and found the cities Physcus and Oeantheia and the other cities which the so-called Ozolian Locrians inhabited. Opus was the father of Cynus, father of Hodoedocus, father of Oileus, father of Ajax the Lesser.
