= Oeum (Locris) =

Fortress/town

Coordinates: 38°37′44″N 23°03′00″E

Oeum or Oion (Ancient Greek: Οἶον) was a mountain fortress and town situated in eastern Locris, above Opus, and destroyed by an earthquake.

Oeum has tentatively been located south of the modern Kastri Atalantis.
