= Upper Larymna =

Town of the Opuntian Locris

Coordinates: 38°31′50″N 23°16′04″E

Upper Larymna (Ancient Greek: Άνω Λάρυμνα, romanized: Ano Larymna) was a town of the Opuntian Locris, later of ancient Phocis and later still of ancient Boeotia, on the river Cephissus.

Strabo relates that the Cephissus emerged from its subterranean channel at Upper Larymna and joined the sea at the Lower Larymna and that Upper Larymna had belonged to ancient Phocis until it was annexed to the Lower or Boeotian Larymna by the Romans. Upper Larymna belonged originally to the Opuntian Locris, and Lycophron mentions it as one of the towns of Ajax Oïleus. Pausanias also states that it was originally Locrian; he adds that it voluntarily joined the Boeotian League on the increase of the power of the Thebans. This, however, probably did not take place in the time of Epaminondas, as the Periplus of Pseudo-Scylax, written subsequently, still calls it a Locrian town. It may have joined the Boeotian League after Thebes had been rebuilt by Cassander. In 230 BCE, Larymna is described as a Boeotian town; in the time of Sulla it is again spoken of as a Boeotian town.

Some scholars conclude from the preceding statements that the more ancient town was the Locrian (Upper) Larymna, situated at a spot called Anchoe by Strabo, where the Cephissus emerged from its subterranean channel. At a distance of a mile and a half (2.5 km) Larymna had a port on the coast, which gradually rose into importance, especially from the time when Larymna joined the Boeotian League, as its port then became the most convenient communication with the eastern sea for Lebadeia, Chaeroneia, Orchomenus, Copae, and other Boeotian towns. The port-town was called, from its position, Lower Larymna, to distinguish it from the Upper city. The former may also have been called more especially the Boeotian Larymna, as it became the seaport of so many Boeotian towns. Upper Larymna, though it had joined the Boeotian League, continued to be frequently called the Locrian, on account of its ancient connection with Locris.

When the Romans united Upper Larymna to Lower Larymna, the inhabitants of the former place were probably transferred to the latter; Upper Larymna was henceforth abandoned. This accounts for Pausanias mentioning only one Larymna, which must have been the Lower city; if he had visited Upper Larymna, he could hardly have failed to mention the emission of the Cephissus at this spot. Moreover, the ruins at Lower Larymna show that it became a place of much more importance than Upper Larymna. These ruins, which are called Kastri, like those of Delphi, are situated on the shore of the Bay of Larmes on a level covered with bushes ten minutes to the left of the mouth of the Cephissus. Upper Larymna's remains are at the modern Bazaraki.

William Martin Leake visited the place in the mid-19th century, and noted that the circuit of the walls is less than a mile (1.6 km). Leake adds that the walls, which in one place are extant to nearly half their height, are of a red soft stone very much corroded by the sea air, and in some places are constructed of rough masses. The sorus is high, with comparison to its length and breadth, and stands in its original place upon the rocks; there was an inscription upon it as well as some ornaments of sculpture which are now quite defaced. The Glyfonero is a small deep pool of water impregnated with salt and was considered by the current inhabitants as cathartic. The sea in the bay south of the ruins is very deep; hence, we ought probably to read in Pausanias λιμὴν δέ σφίσιν ἐστὶν αθγχιβαθής instead of λίμνη, since there is no land-lake at this place.
