= Boagrius River =

River of Locris

The Boagrius or Boagrios (Ancient Greek: Βοάγριος), also called Manes (Μάνης), was the largest river of Locris. It was only a mountain torrent, rising in Mount Cnemis, and flowing into the sea between Scarpheia and Thronium. The river was often dry. The town of Tarphe was also upon its banks. The river is mentioned by Homer in the Iliad. The river significantly changed course following the Locrian earthquake of 426 BCE. It is noted by Strabo, Ptolemy, and Pliny the Elder.
