= Lower Larymna =

Town in ancient Boeotia

Coordinates: 38°33′58″N 23°17′17″E

Lower Larymna (Ancient Greek: Λάρυμνα) was a town in ancient Boeotia, on the river Cephissus. Strabo which relates that the Cephissus emerged from its subterranean channel in Upper Larymna, and joined the sea at the Lower Larymna; Upper Larymna belonged to ancient Phocis until it was annexed to the Lower or Boeotian Larymna by the Romans. Upper Larymna belonged originally to the Opuntian Locris, and Lycophron mentions it as one of the towns of Ajax Oïleus. Pausanias also states that it was originally Locrian; and he adds, that it voluntarily joined the Boeotian League on the increase of the power of the Thebans. This, however, probably did not take place in the time of Epaminondas, as the Periplus of Pseudo-Scylax, written subsequently, still calls it a Locrian town. It may have joined the Boeotian league after Thebes had been rebuilt by Cassander. In the year 230 BCE, Larymna is described as a Boeotian town; and in the time of Sulla it is again spoken of as a Boeotian town.

From these statements you can conclude that the more ancient town was the Locrian (Upper) Larymna, situated in an area, called Anchoe by Strabo, where the Cephissus emerged from its subterranean channel. At the distance of 1.5 miles (2.5 km) Larymna had a port which gradually rose into importance, especially from the time when Larymna joined the Boeotian League, as its port then became the most convenient way of communication with the eastern sea, where Lebadeia, Chaeroneia, Orchomenus, Copae, and other Boeotian towns were situated. The port-town was called, from its position, Lower Larymna, to distinguish it from the Upper city. The former may also have been called more especially the Boeotian Larymna, as it became the seaport of so many Boeotian towns. Upper Larymna, though it had joined the Boeotian League, continued to be frequently called the Locrian, on account of its ancient connection with Locris. When the Romans united Upper Larymna to Lower Larymna, the inhabitants of the former place were probably transferred to the latter; and Upper Larymna was henceforth abandoned. This accounts for Pausanias mentioning only one Larymna, which must have been the Lower city; for if he had visited Upper Larymna, he could hardly have failed to mention the emission of the Cephissus at this spot. Moreover, the ruins at Lower Larymna show that it became a place of much more importance than Upper Larymna. These ruins, which are called Kastri, like those of Delphi, are situated on the shore of the Bay of Larmes, on a level covered with bushes, ten minutes to the left of the mouth of the Cephissus.

William Martin Leake visited the place in the mid-19th century, and notes that the circuit of the walls is less than a mile (1.6 km). Leake adds, that the walls, which in one place are extant to nearly half their height, are of a red soft stone, very much corroded by the sea air, and in some places are constructed of rough masses. The sorus is high, with comparison to its length and breadth, and stands in its original place upon the rocks: there was an inscription upon it, and some ornaments of sculpture, which are now quite defaced. The Glyfonero is a small deep pool of water, impregnated with salt, and was considered by the current inhabitants as cathartic. The sea in the bay south of the ruins is very deep; and hence we ought probably to read in Pausanias, λιμὴν δέ σφίσιν ἐστὶν αθγχιβαθής, instead of λίμνη, since there is no land-lake at this place.
