= Theologos =

Theologos may refer to:

- Theologos, Rhodes, a village on the Greek island of Rhodes
- Theologos, Thasos, a village on the Greek island of Thasos
- Theologos, Phthiotis, Central Greece, site of ancient Halae
