= Hodoedocus =

In Greek mythology, Hodoedocus or Hodedocus (/həˈdɛdəkəs/; Ancient Greek: Ὁδοίδοκος) was a son of Cynus and grandson of Opus. His father and sister, Larymna, were eponyms of the cities Kynos in Locris and Larymna in Boeotia respectively.

Hodoedocus was the father of Oileus by Agrianome, daughter of Perseon, and of Calliarus by Laonome.
