= Thronion =

Thronion or Thronium (Ancient Greek: Θρόνιον) may refer to:

- Thronion (Illyria)
- Thronium (Locris)
