= Calliarus =

Town in Eastern Locris mentioned by Homer

Coordinates: 38°40′24″N 23°03′48″E

Calliarus or Kalliaros (Ancient Greek: Καλλίαρος) was a town in Eastern Locris mentioned by Homer in the Catalogue of Ships of the Iliad. It was uninhabited in Strabo's time, but its name was still attached to a tract of ground on account of the fertility of the latter. According to Greek mythology, the town's eponymous founder was Kalliaros, a son of Laonome and Hodoedocus.

Its site is tentative located near Skala Atalantis.
