= Euanthia =

Euanthia or Euantheia may refer to:

- Aydın, an ancient Greek town now in Turkey
- Oeantheia, a town of ancient Locris, Greece
