= Augeiae (Locris) =

Ancient town of Locris Epicnemidia

Augeiae or Augeiai (Ancient Greek: Αὐγειαί) was an ancient town of Locris Epicnemidia, near Scarpheia, mentioned by Homer in the Catalogue of Ships in the Iliad, but which had disappeared in the time of Strabo and its territory had been taken by Scarpheia.

Its site is unlocated.
