= Tarphe =

Coordinates: 38°45′10″N 22°36′56″E

Tarphe (Ancient Greek: Τάρφη) was a town of the Epicnemidian Locrians on the Boagrius River. It is mentioned by Homer in the Catalogue of Ships in the Iliad. Strabo writes that it was situated upon a height in a fertile and woody country, and was said to have derived its name from the thickets in which it stood. In the time of Strabo it had changed its name into that of Pharygae (Φαρύγαι), and was said to have received a colony from Argos. It contained a temple of Hera Pharygaea.

The temple was described:

"Tarphe is situated on a height . . . its territory is both fruitful and well-wooded, for already this place had been named from its being thickly wooded. But it is now called Pharygai; and here is situated a temple of Hera Pharugaia, so called from the Hera in the Argive Pharygai; and, indeed, they say that they are colonists of the Argives."

Its site has been tentatively located near modern Mendenitsa.
