= Narycus =

Coordinates: 38°42′52″N 22°42′38″E

Narycus or Narykos (Ancient Greek: Νάρυκος), or Naryx (Νάρυξ), or Naryca or Naryka (Νάρυκα), or Narycium, was a town of the Opuntian Locrians, the reputed birthplace of Ajax, son of Oileus, who is hence called by Ovid "Narycius heros". In 395 BC, Ismenias, a Boeotian commander, undertook an expedition against Phocis, and defeated the Phocians near Naryx of Locris, whence we may conclude that Narycus was near the frontier of Phocis. In 352 BC, Narycus was taken by Phayllus, the Phocian commander. As Locri in Bruttium in Italy was, according to some of the ancients, a colony of Narycus, the epithet of Narycian is frequently given to the Bruttian pitch.

Its location is near the modern Rengini.
