= Acrion =

Ancient Greek Pythagorean philosopher

Acrion was a Locrian from Magna Graecia and a Pythagorean philosopher. He is mentioned by Valerius Maximus under the name of Arion. According to William Smith, Arion is a false reading of Acrion.
