= Kollyra curse tablet =

Locrian Greek artifact

The curse tablet of Kollyra was first discovered in Southern Italy in 1755. The text of the inscription, which is written exclusively on one side, has been identified as a sample of the Locrian dialect of Ancient Greek. Based on the script of the writing, the terminus ante quem for the creation of the tablet has been dated to the 3rd-century BCE. The text proclaims that it was authored by a woman named Kollyra ("Κολλύρα"), who—in the inscription—accuses another woman named Melita ("Μελίτα") of stealing a cloak from her and curses them in retribution. Due to the presence of the masculine nominative singular form "ἔχων" ("ékhōn"), it has been stipulated the text may also reference a male individual involved in the purported theft. However, other classical philologists—such as Georg Kaibel—argue that the final sentences of the text only refer to one thief, contradicting the notion that multiple individuals were targeted by the curse.

It is unclear precisely what punishment was intended for the suspects. The inscription proclaims that, as long as the accused remains accursed, they will "μὴ ψυχὰν ἀνείη" ("mḕ psukhàn aneíē"), which may be translated as "they shall not breathe freely." This passage could be interpreted as a figurative declaration that the subject of the curse shall experience panic, although such a stipulation lacks the typically magical hexes offered by other curse tablets. Alternatively, it could be construed as a magical imprecation declaring that the accursed will suffer from shortness of breath, which obeys the tendency of other defixiones to wish for illnesses to befall the target of the curse, though it still lacks the same extremity of the curses proffered in other tablets.

The classicist Bonnie MacLachlan further argues that, unlike most defixiones, the Kollyra curse tablet was likely designed to be publicly displayed, as the tablet bore a hole in the upper-lefthand corner from which the object may have been suspended. MacLachlan postulates that, more specifically, the tablet was set to be displayed in a shrine dedicated to Persephone, citing the cooccurrence of the phrase sequence "τᾶι θεῶι" ("tâi theôi") on the Kollyra tablet and multiple inscriptions from the shrine of Persephone in Epizephyrian Locris. According to MacLachlan, the act of publicly showcasing the suspected thief and their supposed crime would have prevented Melita, and her potential accomplice, from easily avoiding any wider suspicion or possible social outcasting as a consequence of their crime. Moreover, Kollyra consecrated the stolen cloak to the attendants ("προπόλοις," "propólois") of a goddess, Kollyra may have ritualistically transferred the item to the possession of that deity and therefore had turned the crime from regular theft into temple-theft. Throughout the inscription, Kollyra appears assertive, confident, and vocal; she may have publicly broadcast the text, and she does not opt to entreat or beseech the deity, which may indicate that she had already expected divine assistance without any supplication. Cults dedicated Persephone may have partially forgone the traditional social and legal confines normally allotted to Ancient Greek women and provided them with less restrictive environments, perhaps explaining the ability of Kollyra to act in such a public and vocal manner.

== Text ==
In Ancient Greek:

[ἀνιαρίζει Κολλύρα] ταῖς προπόλοις
[τᾶς θεῶ τὸ ἱμάτιον] τὸ πελλόν, τὸ
[ἔλαβέ τις καὶ] οὐκ ἀποδίδωτι καὶ
[ἀπονοσφίζεται κ]αὶ χρῆται καὶ ἴσατι,
πῇ ἐστι̣. ἀ̣ν̣θεί̣[η τᾶι] θεῷ δυωδεκαπλοῦ̣ν
σὺν ἡμεδίμνω̣[ι λιβά]νω̣, ὧι πόλις νομίζει·
μὴ πρότερον δὲ τὰν ψυχὰν ἀ{ι}νείη {²⁶ἀνείη}²⁶ ὁ ἔχων
τὸ ἱμάτιον, ἕστε ἀνθείη τᾶι θεῷ.
ἀνιαρίζει Κολλύρα ταῖς προπόλοις τᾶς θεῶ
τὼς τρῖς χρυσέως, τὼς ἔλαβε Μελίτα
καὶ οὐκ ἀποδίδωτι· ἀνθείη τᾶι θεῶι
δυωδεκαπλόα σὺν μεδίμνωι λιβάνω {ι},
ὧι πόλις νομίζει· μὴ πρότερον δὲ τὰν
ψυχὰν ἀνείη, ἕστε ἀνθείη τᾶι θεῷ.
εἰ δὲ συνπίοι ἢ συμφάγοι μὴ {η} ἰσαώσᾳ,
ἀθῶιος εἴην, ἢ ὑπὸ τὸν αὐτὸν ἀετὸν ὑπέλ-
θοι.

Latinization of the text:

aniarízei Kollúra] taîs propólois [tâs theô tò himátion] tò pellón, tò [élabé tis kaì] ouk apodídōti kaì [aponosphízetai k]aì khrêtai kaì ísati, pēî estị. ạṇtheị́[ē tâi] theōî duōdekaploụ̂n sùn hēmedímnọ̄[i libá]nọ̄, hôi pólis nomízei; mḕ próteron dè tàn psukhàn a{i}neíē {²⁶aneíē}²⁶ ho ékhōn tò himátion, héste antheíē tâi theōî. aniarízei Kollúra taîs propólois tâs theô tṑs trîs khruséōs, tṑs élabe Melíta kaì ouk apodídōti; antheíē tâi theôi duōdekaplóa sùn medímnōi libánō {i},hôi pólis nomízei; mḕ próteron dè tàn psukhàn aneíē, héste antheíē tâi theōî.ei dè sunpíoi ḕ sumphágoi mḕ {ē} isaṓsāi, athôios eíēn, ḕ hupò tòn autòn aetòn hupél- thoi.

In English, as translated by Bonnie MacLachlan:

Kollyra consecrates to the attendants of the goddess . . . her cloak, the dark-coloured one, that someone took and is not giving back, and . . . uses it and knows where it is. Let this person dedicate to the goddess twelve times its worth with half a medimnos of incense, as the city requires. May the one who has my cloak not breathe freely until he makes the dedication to the goddess. Kollyra consecrates to the attendants of the goddess the three gold coins which Melita took and is not giving back. Let her dedicate to the goddess twelve times their worth with a medimnos of incense as the city requires. May she not breathe freely until she has made the dedication to the goddess. If she should drink with me or eat with me and I do not know it, or go under the same roof as me, may I be unharmed.

In English, as translated by Ian Plant:

Kollyra dedicates to the ministers [of the goddess the dark cloak], which [(?) . . . took . . .] and did not return and [ . . .] and is using and she knows [... ]it is; let her dedicate to the goddess twelvefold with a half unit of incense, according to the normal practice of the city. And may she not draw her breath, [while she has] the cloak, until she makes the dedication to the goddess. Kollyra dedicates to the ministers of the goddess the three gold coins that Melita took and did not return. Let her dedicate twelvefold to the goddess, with a unit of incense, according to the normal practice of the city. And may she not draw breath until she makes the dedication to the goddess. And if they drink or eat together, may she remain unharmed and not know, or if she comes under the same roof.
