= Locri =

- Comune
- Comune di Locri
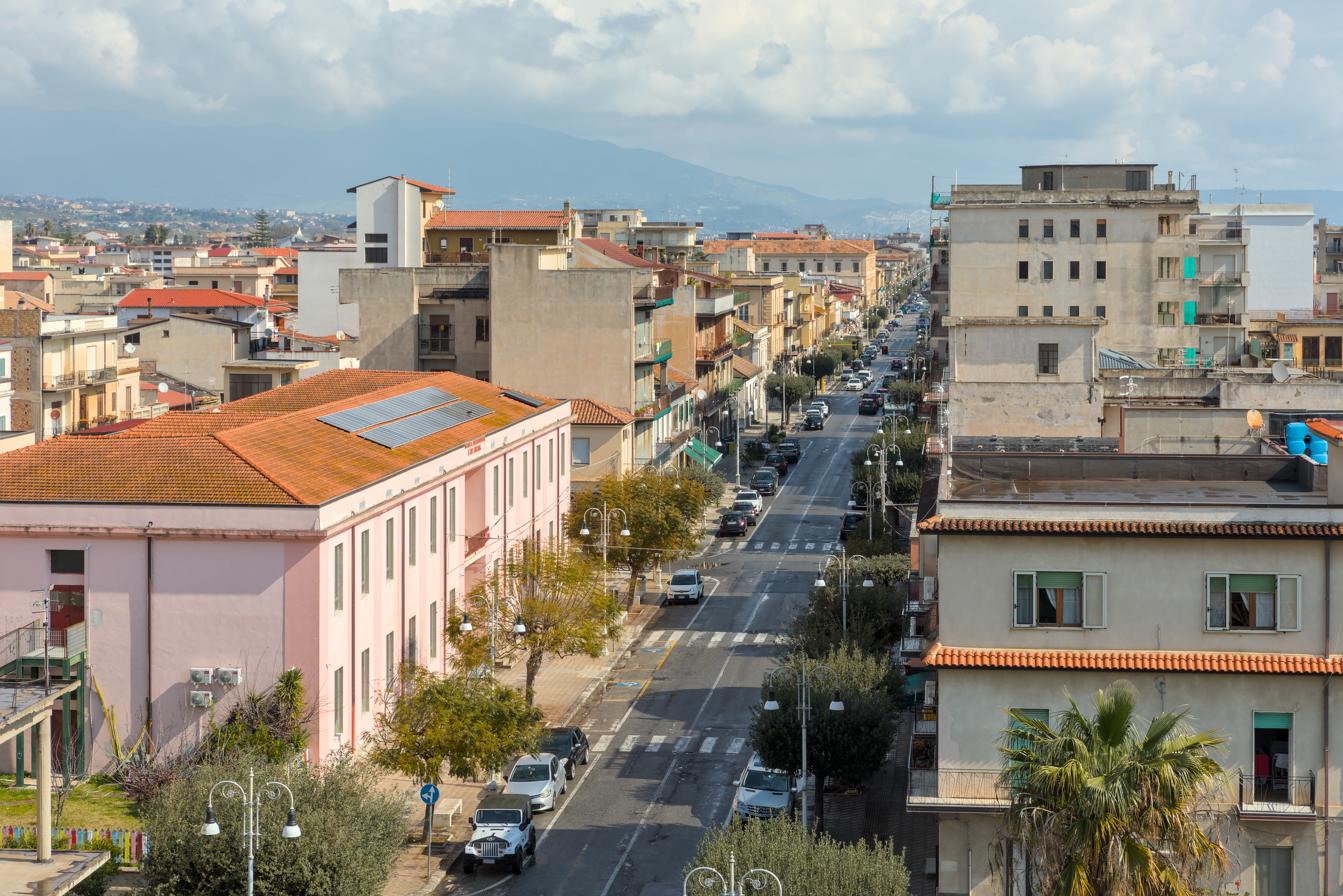

- Coat of arms

- Location within Italy Location within Calabria
- Coordinates: 38°12′57.65″N 16°13′43.62″E
- Country: Italy
- Region: Calabria
- Metropolitan city: Reggio Calabria (RC)
- Frazioni: Moschetta, San Fili, Baldari

Government
  - Mayor: Giuseppe Fontana

Area
  - Total: 25 km^{2} (9.7 sq mi)

Population (2018-01-01)
  - Total: 12,367
  - Density: 490/km^{2} (1,300/sq mi)
- Time zone: UTC+1 (CET)
  - Summer (DST): UTC+2 (CEST)
- Postal code: 89044
- Dialing code: 0964
- Patron saint: St. Catherine
- Saint day: November 24
- Website: Official website

Locri is a town and comune (municipality) in the province of Reggio Calabria, Calabria, southern Italy. Its name derives from that of the ancient Greek region of Locris. Today it is an important administrative and cultural center on the Ionian Coast and within its province.

== History ==
Epizephyrian Locris or Locri Epizephyrii (Ancient Greek: Λοκροί Ἐπιζεφύριοι, romanized: Lokroí Epizephúrioi; from the plural of Λοκρός (Lokros, "a Locrian"), ἐπί (epí, "on"), Ζέφυρος (Zéphuros, "West Wind"), thus "the Western Locrians") was founded about 680 BC on the Italian shore of the Ionian Sea, near modern Capo Zefirio, by the Locrians, apparently by Opuntii (East Locrians) from the city of Opus, but including Ozolae (West Locrians) and Lacedaemonians. Its Latin name, Locri, is the plural of the Latin Locrus, which was used both to mean an inhabitant of Locris and the eponymous ancestor of the Locrians. Strabo suggests that the Ozolian Locrians were the principal founders, while Ephorus held that the Locri was a colony of Opuntian Locris.

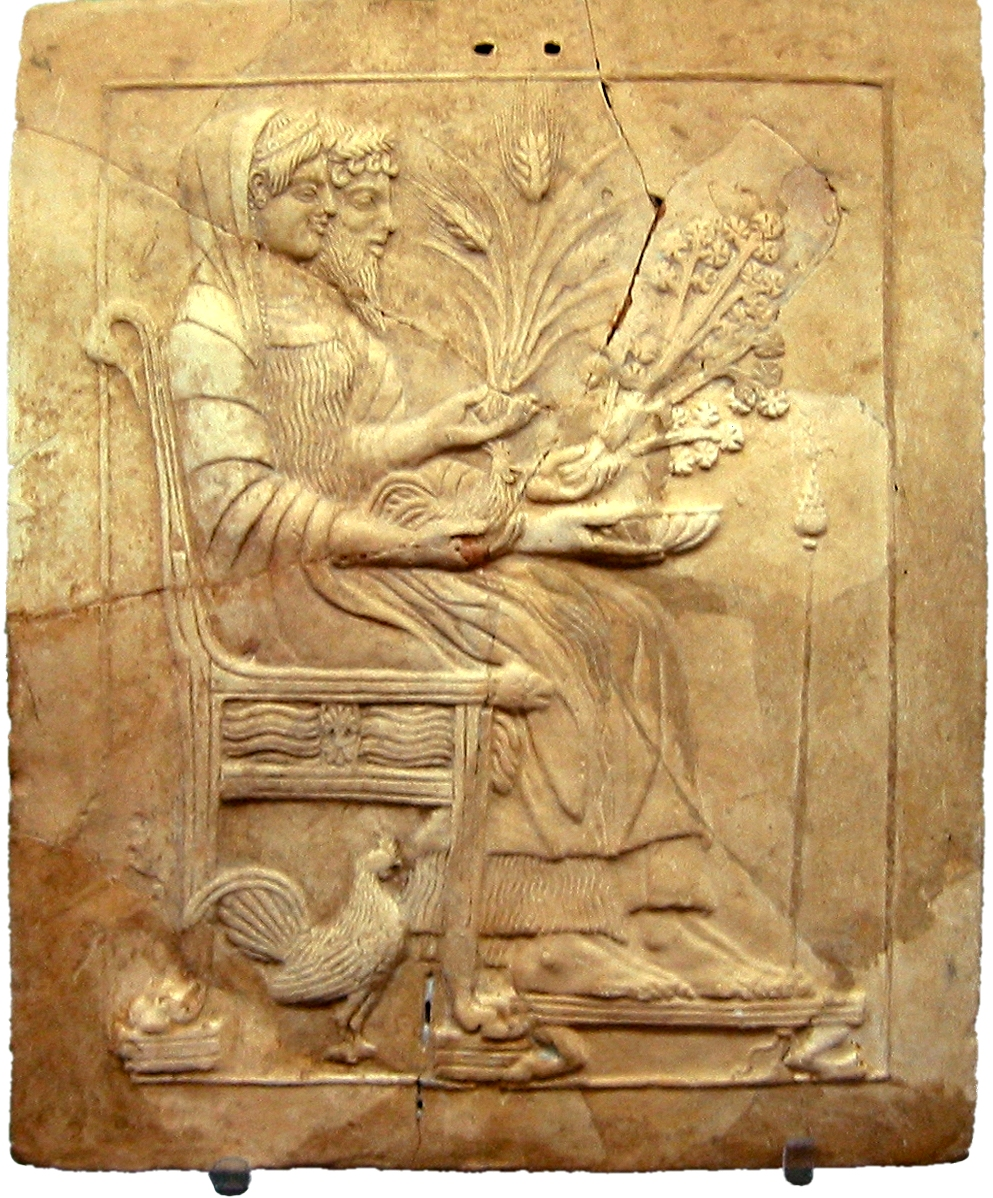
Pinax from Locris: Persephone and Hades sitting on the throne

Due to fierce winds at an original settlement, the settlers moved to the present site. After a century, a defensive wall was built. Outside the city there are several necropoleis, some of which are very large.

Its renowned lawgiver Zaleucus decreed that anyone who proposed a change in the laws should do so with a noose about their neck, with which they should be hanged if the amendment did not pass. Plato called it "The flower of Italy", due to the local peoples' characteristics.

Locris was the site of two great sanctuaries, that of Persephone and of Aphrodite. Perhaps uniquely, Persephone was worshiped as protector of marriage and childbirth, a role usually assumed by Hera, and Diodorus Siculus knew the temple there as the most illustrious in Italy.

In the early centuries Locris was allied with Sparta, and later with Syracuse. It founded two colonies of its own, Hipponion and Medma.

During the 5th century BC, votive pinakes in terracotta were often dedicated as offerings to the goddess, made in series and painted with bright colors, animated by scenes connected to the myth of Persephone. Many of these pinakes are now on display in the National Museum of Magna Græcia in Reggio Calabria. Locrian pinakes represent one of the most significant categories of objects from Magna Graecia, both as documents of religious practice and as works of art. In the iconography of votive plaques at Locri, her abduction and marriage to Hades served as an emblem of the marital state, children at Locri were dedicated to Persephone, and maidens about to be wed brought their peplos to be blessed.

During the Pyrrhic Wars (280-275 BC) fought between Pyrrhus of Epirus and Rome, Locris accepted a Roman garrison and fought against the Epirote king. However, the city changed sides numerous times during the war. Bronze tablets from the treasury of its Olympeum, a temple to Zeus, record payments to a 'king', generally thought to be Pyrrhus. Despite this, Pyrrhus plundered the temple of Persephone at Locris before his return to Epirus, an event which would live on in the memory of the Greeks of Italy. At the end of the war, perhaps to allay fears about its loyalty, Locris minted coins depicting a seated Rome being crowned by 'Pistis', a goddess personifying good faith and loyalty, and returned to the Roman fold.

The city was abandoned in the 5th century AD. The town was finally destroyed by the Saracens in 915. The survivors fled inland about 10 kilometres (6 mi) to the town Gerace on the slopes of the Aspromonte.

== Modern Locri ==
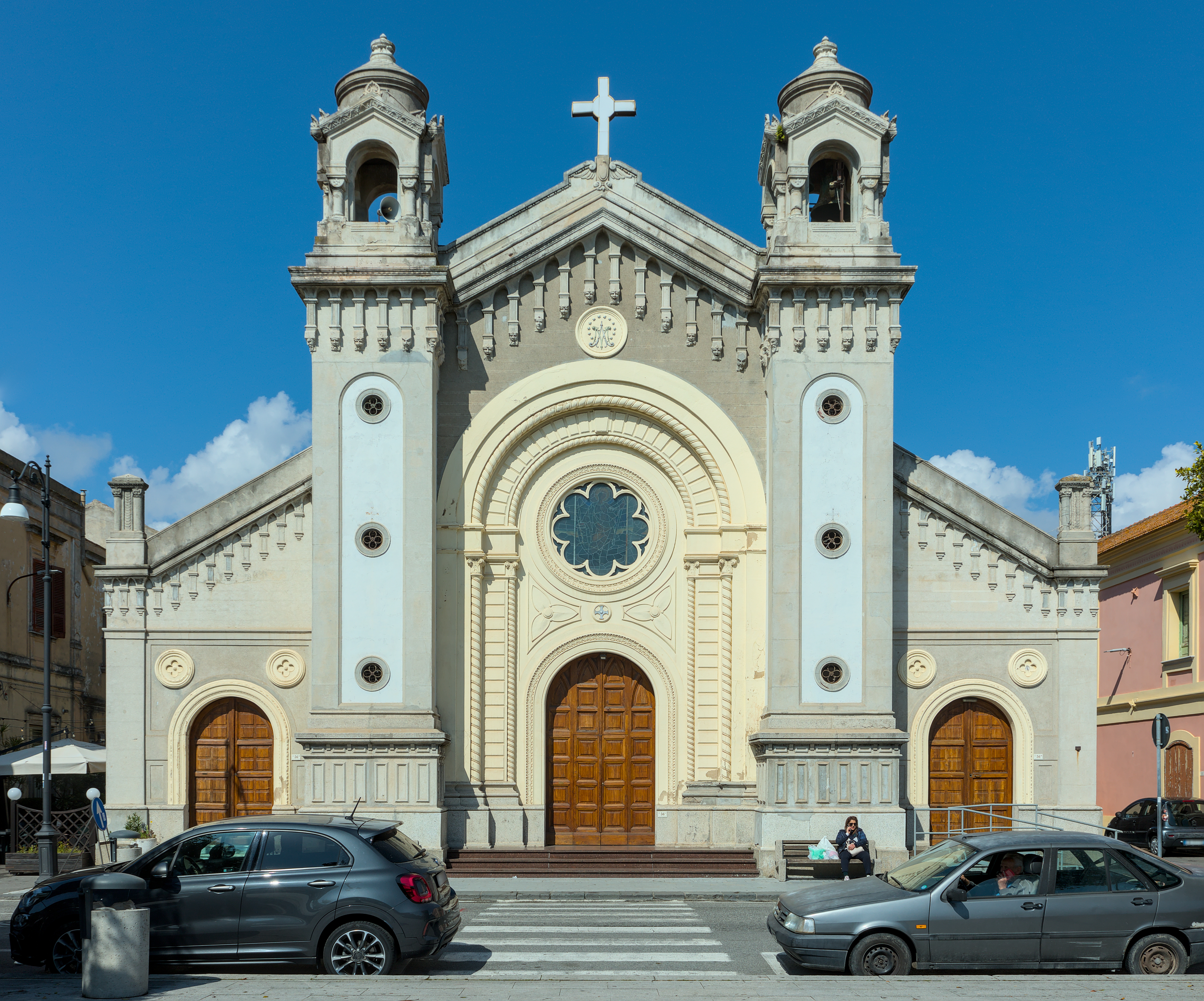
St. Catherine church

After 1850 Gerace developed along the coast, forming a new centre Gerace Marina, to house new public buildings and a railway station. In 1934 it changed its name in Locri, which is now the administrative centre of the Locride area. The city boasts a National Museum and an Archaeological Park. Apart from the archeological sites, the town is also an important sea-side resort along the Costa dei Gelsomini, or Jasmine Coast, one of the wildest coastlines of Italy.

Locri, with over 12,000 inhabitants, is an important administrative and cultural centre on the Ionian Coast, in the Italian Province of Reggio Calabria. The town is easily reached by plane; in fact, it is only 90 minutes away from the International Airport of Lamezia Terme and from the Airport of Reggio Calabria. Locri is well connected to all regional and national towns and cities by train, shuttle, taxi, and bus. The A2 autoroute makes Locri easy to reach by car, too.

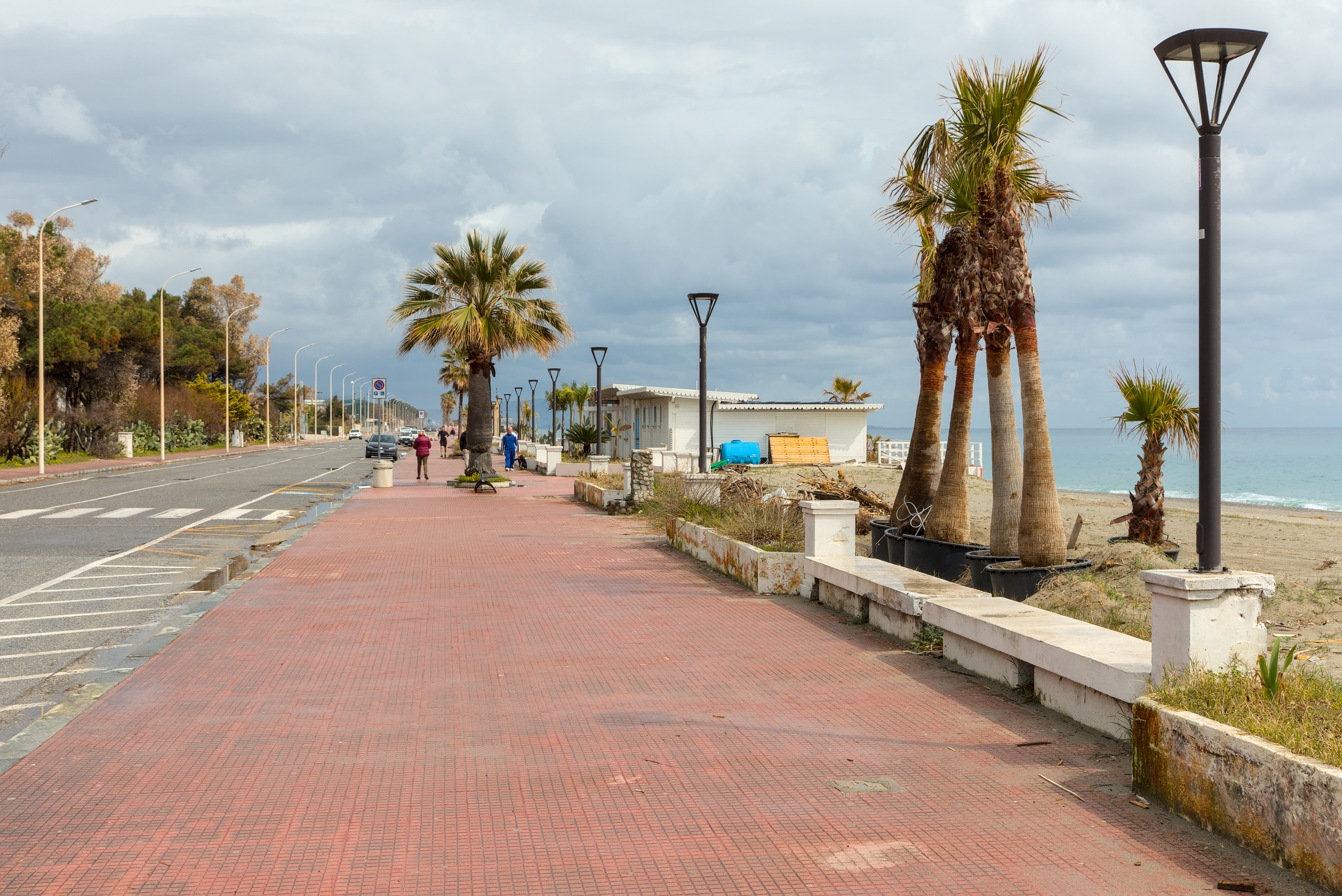
The seaside promenade (Lungomare)

Sicily is accessible by ferry boat from Villa San Giovanni or Reggio Calabria, both of which are a car or a train journey away from Locri. There are several hotels, residences, hostels, and bed&breakfast establishments where tourists and visitors can find comfortable accommodation for their stay. The Tourist Information Centre can offer assistance and information on matters of accommodation. In Locri, you can find many administrative bodies and public services, such as a criminal and civil court, a revenue agency, a police station, travel agencies, three post offices (two of which have ATM facilities), banks, the State Archive, the City Hall (built in 1880), trade unions, the bishop's office, several Catholic churches, and an Indian and an Evangelical church. The city is also home to the most important hospital of the area, an emergency medical service, many private doctors, and three pharmacies. There are in the locality several state schools – including Elementary Schools, High Schools, Lyceums, and Vocational Schools – as well as private schools and two private English language schools . The city boasts a National Museum and an Archaeological Park, two cinemas, two cultural centres, a theatre, and a library. In Locri you will find many shops, restaurants, pizzerias, fast food outlets, pubs, bars, cafeterias, patisseries, farm restaurants, fruit and vegetable market halls, florists, supermarkets, and shopping malls. You also have facilities for a wide range of sports, including soccer, basketball, volleyball, tennis, swimming, snorkeling, fishing and diving, and, because there is nearby hilly and mountainous terrain, trekking and hiking are further options. Finally, being a seaside city, Locri can offer enjoyable walks on the sea-front boulevard or on the beach and in the summer months it plays host to an assortment of beach-side lidos.

== Main sights ==
=== Ionic temple of Marasà ===
In the first half of the fifth century BC, the Locrians demolished their archaic temple and rebuilt a new temple in the Ionic style. The temple was designed by Syracusan architects around 470 BC, based on the idea of Hiero I of Syracuse.

The new temple occupies the same place as the previous one but it has a different orientation. The temple was destroyed in the 11th century. The dimensions of the temple were 45.5 by 19.8 metres (149 by 65 ft). The cella is free of supports on the central axes. The pronaos had two columns. The temple has seventeen Ionic columns on the long side, and six on the front. The height of the temple was 12 metres (39 ft).

According to Italian scholar Margherita Guarducci, the famous Ludovisi Throne comes from the temple of Aphrodite of Epizephyrian Locris, where it was used as the parapet of the bothros. This theory is strengthened by the measures of the sculpture which fit perfectly together with the three great stones of the covering of the bothros; stones still existing and open to visits inside the archaeological area of the Temple of contrada Marasà.

=== Theatre ===
The theatre was built in the fourth century BC not far from the ancient city, in the Contrada Pirettina, taking advantage of a hillside slope. The original structure had space for more than 4,500 people; now only the central part of the theatre is visible.

Part of the Cavea was cut into the rocks. Each plane was divided in 7 wedges between 6 scales. A horizontal separation divided the upper theater from the lower theatre.

=== Ludovisi Throne ===
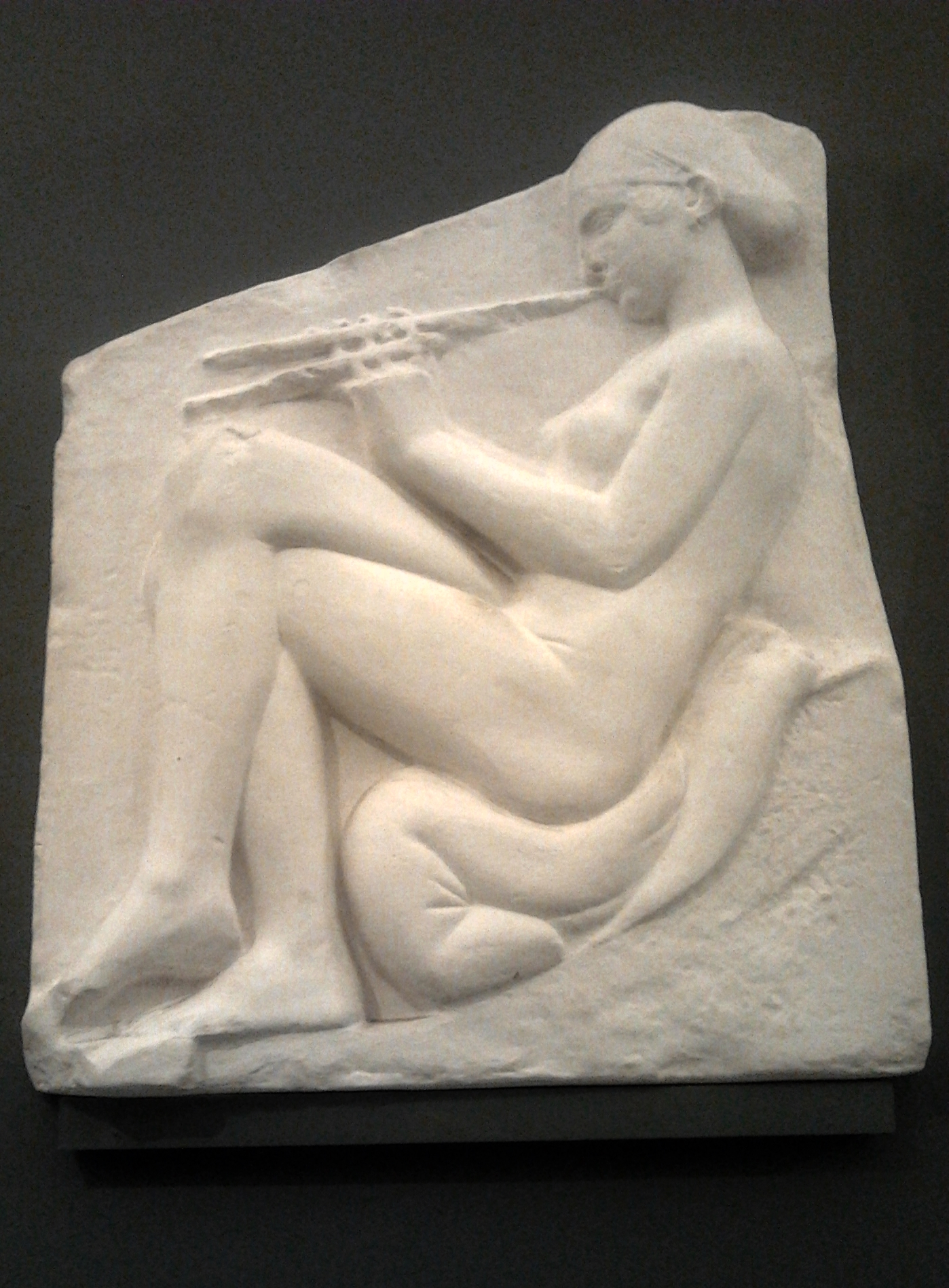
Left-hand panel of the throne: a woman playing the aulos

In 1982, the exquisite and famous Ludovisi Throne, found reused in the ancient Roman gardens of Sallust in 1887, was securely linked to the newly studied Ionic temple at Marasà, in Locri. A reconstruction of the throne was shown to fit exactly into remaining blocks in the temple's foundations, and it has been suggested that terracotta votive plaques, or pinakes, of cults at Epizephyrian Locris, are the only stylistic parallel to the Throne.

The marble sculpture, in its bas-relief decoration, represents on the front side Aphrodite born from the sea foam (but some scholars sees in it the representation of Persephone coming back from the Hades) and helped by two maidservants to raise from the water, while on the left side is represented a naked flute-girl seated on a cushion and playing the double-flute, and on the right side a veiled woman using an incense-burner.

== Notable people ==
- Acrion (Pythagorean philosopher)
- Nossis (ancient epigrammist and poet)
- Philistion of Locri (ancient physician and writer on medicine)
- Timaeus of Locri (Pythagorean philosopher)
- Zaleucus (devised the first written Greek law code)
