= Daphnus =

Daphnous
- Location within Greece
- 38°45′23″N 22°51′27″E
- Location: Greece

Daphnus or Daphnous (Ancient Greek: Δαφνοῦς) was a city on the Euboean Sea, originally belonging to ancient Phocis, which thus extended from the Corinthian Gulf to the Euboean sea. Its narrow territory separated the Locri Epicnemidii from the Locri Opuntii; but it was afterwards assigned to the Opuntii. The town was in ruins in the time of Strabo, who fixes its site by describing it as 20 stadia distant from Cynus and 120 from Elateia, and as having a harbour. Daphnus appears in an inscription dated to 407 BCE. Daphnus lay at the head of a pass that was one of the major arteries from northern to central Greece.

== Archaeology ==
The site of Daphnus is near the modern village of Agios Konstantinos. The ruins of Daphnus were first noted in 1844 by Ludwig Ross.

The ancient site was re-discovered in 2005-2007 during the construction of the main road above the modern town in the area of the Malian Gulf.

The most important discovery is the very well preserved but previously unknown Sanctuary of Asklepios, containing a group of statues, and which has turned out to be one of the earliest Asklepieia on the Greek mainland, dating from the 5th century BC.
