= Locrians =

Ancient Greek tribe

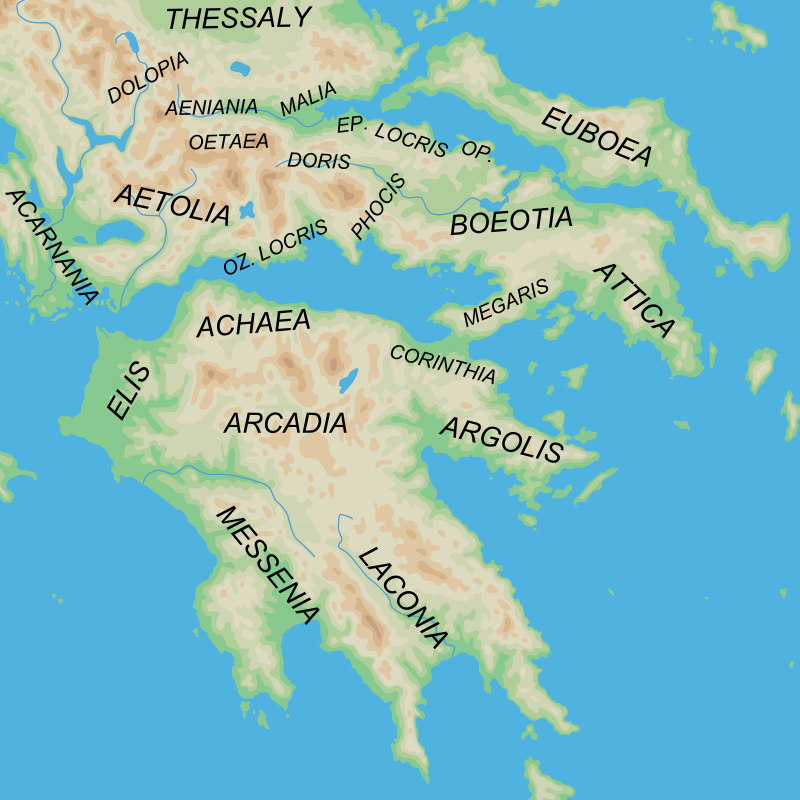
Map showing eastern Opuntian and western Ozolian Locris in Central Greece.

The Locrians (Greek: Λοκροί, Lokroi) were an ancient Greek tribe that inhabited the region of Locris in Central Greece, around Parnassus. They spoke the Locrian dialect, a Doric-Northwest dialect, and were closely related to their neighbouring tribes, the Phocians and the Dorians. They were divided into two geographically distinct tribes, the western Ozolians and the eastern Opuntians; their primary towns were Amphissa and Opus respectively, and their most important colony was the city of Epizephyrian Locris in Magna Graecia, which still bears the name "Locri" to this day. Among others, Ajax the Lesser and Patroclus were the most famous Locrian heroes, both distinguished in the Trojan War. Zaleucus from Epizephyrian Locris devised the first written Greek law code, the Locrian code.

== Mythology ==
In Greek mythology, the Locrians were the descendants of Locrus, great-grandson of Deucalion and Pyrrha, the founders of the Greek race. According to some traditions, Deucalion was a native of the Locrian city of Opus, thus the Locrians are said to have been the first tribe to be called "Hellenes". Some ancient writers supposed the name of the Locrians to be derived from an ancient king of the Leleges, the prehistoric residents of Locris, named Locrus, and Dionysius of Halicarnassus mention that "Locrians" is the later name of the Leleges, in the way that many ancient writers inaccurately identified several Greek tribes with the aboriginal peoples of Greece. It is argued that the word "locros" means "branch" and that the "Locrians" was not a specific nation but the various "branches", ie the tribes, participating in an alliance / amphictyony.

The Locrians around Thermopylae were the first to have been called Hellenes. Later the name expanded to include the other Greek tribes through the Amphictionia of Delphi, to which they belonged, and their religion. The most famous of their heroes were Ajax the Locrian, best known as Ajax the Lesser, son of Oileus; and Patroclus, son of Menoetius and best friend of Achilles. Elements of Ajax worship have been found in Euboea, Pontus, the Aegean islands, Asia Minor, Peloponnesus, Kerkyra, Epirus, southern Italy, and northern Africa; which means that the Locrian civilization was widely extended in the ancient Greek world. In Greek mythology, the Locrians are closely related to the Phocians and Eleans.

James M. Redfield, professor of Classics at the University of Chicago, in his book The Locrian Maidens: Love and Death in Greek Italy, states that the Locrians of Epizephyrian Locri had a special way to treat the sex difference. Although the Locrians hardly viewed men and women as equals, women held special religious rights, which men could gain access to only by marrying them. Locrian women became the vehicles for the transmission of status, and marriage maintained the social order of a traditional oligarchy.

=== Ajax the Lesser ===
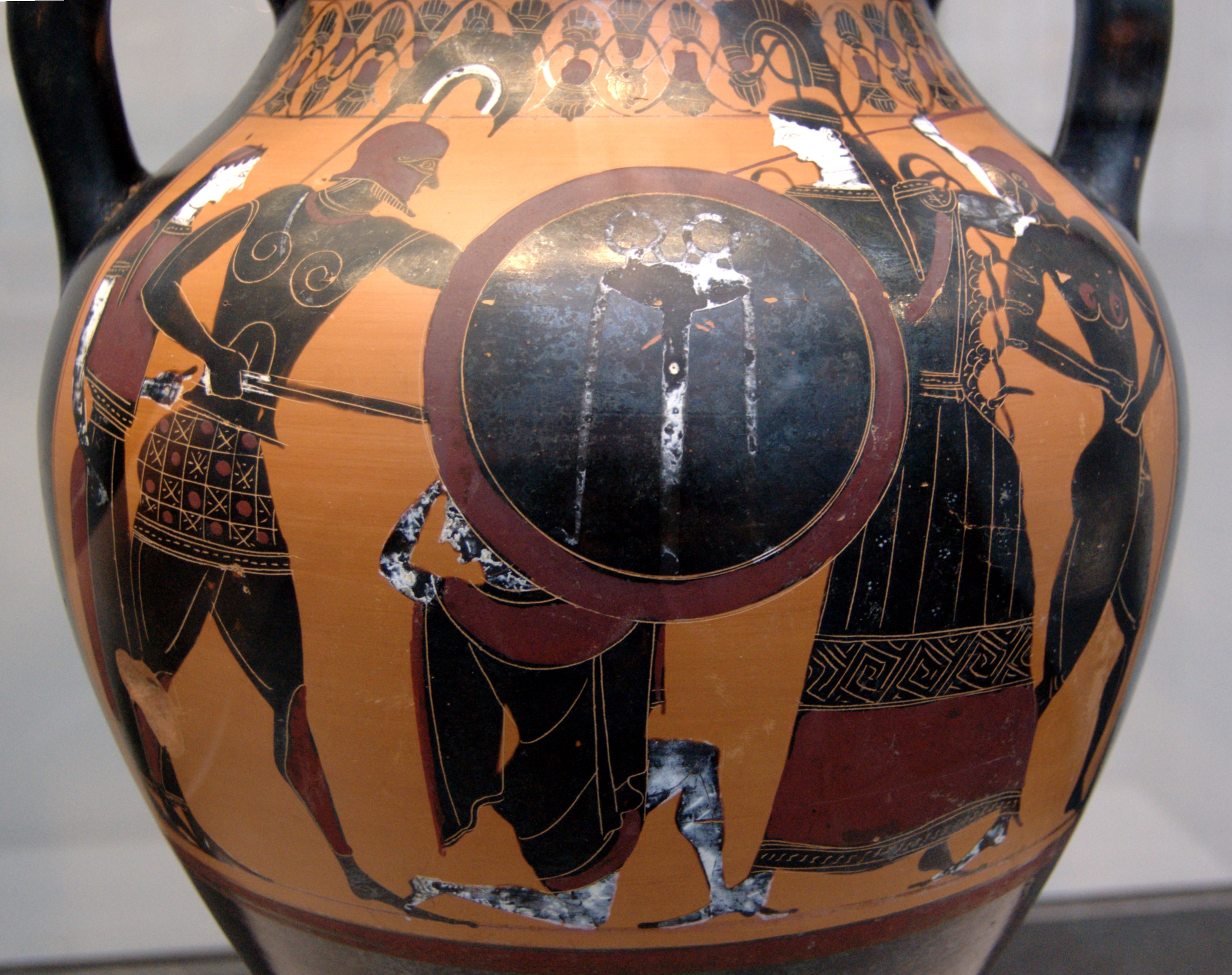
Ajax raping Cassandra from the Palladium. Side A of an Attic black-figure amphora, ca. 540 BC. From Vulci.

The national hero of the Locrians was Ajax the Locrian, who led the 40 Locrian ships to Troy, to take part in the Trojan War. Locrians respected him so much, that after his death they kept a place for him in their phalanx, thinking that he will always fight with them. On the other side, Ajax's actions resulted in his death according to Greek mythology, while the Locrian tribe suffered from the anger of the gods.

=== The curse ===
According to Lycophron, in his work Alexandra, for this crime of their national hero, the Locrians had to send two unmarried maidens to the temple of Athena at Ilion of Athens for 1,000 years, where they should live until they died. After their death, they would not be given a decent burial, while for each maiden who died, another one must be sent into the temple by night, and she would be stoned to death if seen.

The goddess is referred to as "Athena Ilias", a name not necessarily derived from Ilion, but maybe from the family deity Oileus, the father of Ajax and the ancestral hero of the Locrians. She could have protected the maidens during their period of initiation.

Callimachus mentions that the curse fell upon Locris three years after the Trojan war, which led to the beginning of the tribute at the command of the Delphic oracle. According to Apollodorus, after the command of the Delphic oracle, two maidens were sent to Ilion, and their duty was to clean the temple. After their death, they were replaced, while the tribute ended after a thousand years with the end of the Phocian War, which destroyed Naryca, the town that supplied the maidens. Aelian says that the plague fell upon Locris after the Locrians failed to send the yearly tribute that the oracle demanded. Demetrius of Scepsis knows that the maidens were sent for the first time "when the Persians were already in control", so after 547 BC.

Locrian maidens had the appearance of a Greek mourner, as they went to Ilion barefoot, wearing only one garment and their hair was loose or cut. Cut hair symbolizes maturity for both sexes and plays a part in marriage rituals, while loosened or cut hair are required in other cults such as to Demeter and Dionysus, and bare feet in other as well. In addition to these, loosened hair and bare feet are signs of a witch.

These maidens were not given proper burials, as most of them were burnt on a pyre of barren branches and the ashes were thrown to the sea. This kind of pyre was used in Greece to burn criminals and the barren trees were used to burn portents and prodigies, while criminals were hanged from these trees. Locrian maidens were seen as marginal beings and scapegoats, separated from normal life, a feature of rites of passage. The three stages of rites of passage are separation, marginalization and reincorporation, and according to this, the maidens left for Ilion, spent a year there and returned home. In Epizephyrian Locri, maidens were prostituted as a reminder and punishment for a certain act. Ancient basis for prostitution was that girls would marry earlier than their coevals and foreigners would complete the rites. The completion of the rites enhances the status of girls.

In the middle of the 6th century, this cult became more epic focused and centered on the expiation for the crimes of Ajax. As a result, later generations forgot its significance and put an end to this tribute; but a Greek inscription, discovered in Locris at the end of the nineteenth century, proves that the Locrians continued to send out pairs of maidens until the 3rd century BC.

== History and distribution ==
The Locrians are said to have arrived in southern Greece in the late 2nd millennium BC from their homeland on Pindus, when the Greek tribes moved southwards. In historical times, the Locrians were divided into two distinct tribes, differing from each other in customs, habits and civilization. Of these, the eastern Locrians, called the Opuntian and Epicnemedian, dwelt on the eastern coast of Greece, opposite the island of Euboea, while the western Locrians, called Ozolian or Esperian, dwelt on the Corinthian gulf and were separated from the former by Mount Parnassus and the whole of Doris and Phocis.

It is likely that Locrian territory once extended from sea to sea, then was divided as a result of the immigration of the Phocians and Dorians. The most famous colony of the Locrian tribe was the city of Epizephyrian Locri, founded in the 7th century BC in Magna Graecia, which exists until today as Locri. According to Strabo the founders were the Ozolian Locrians, from the region of Amphissa.

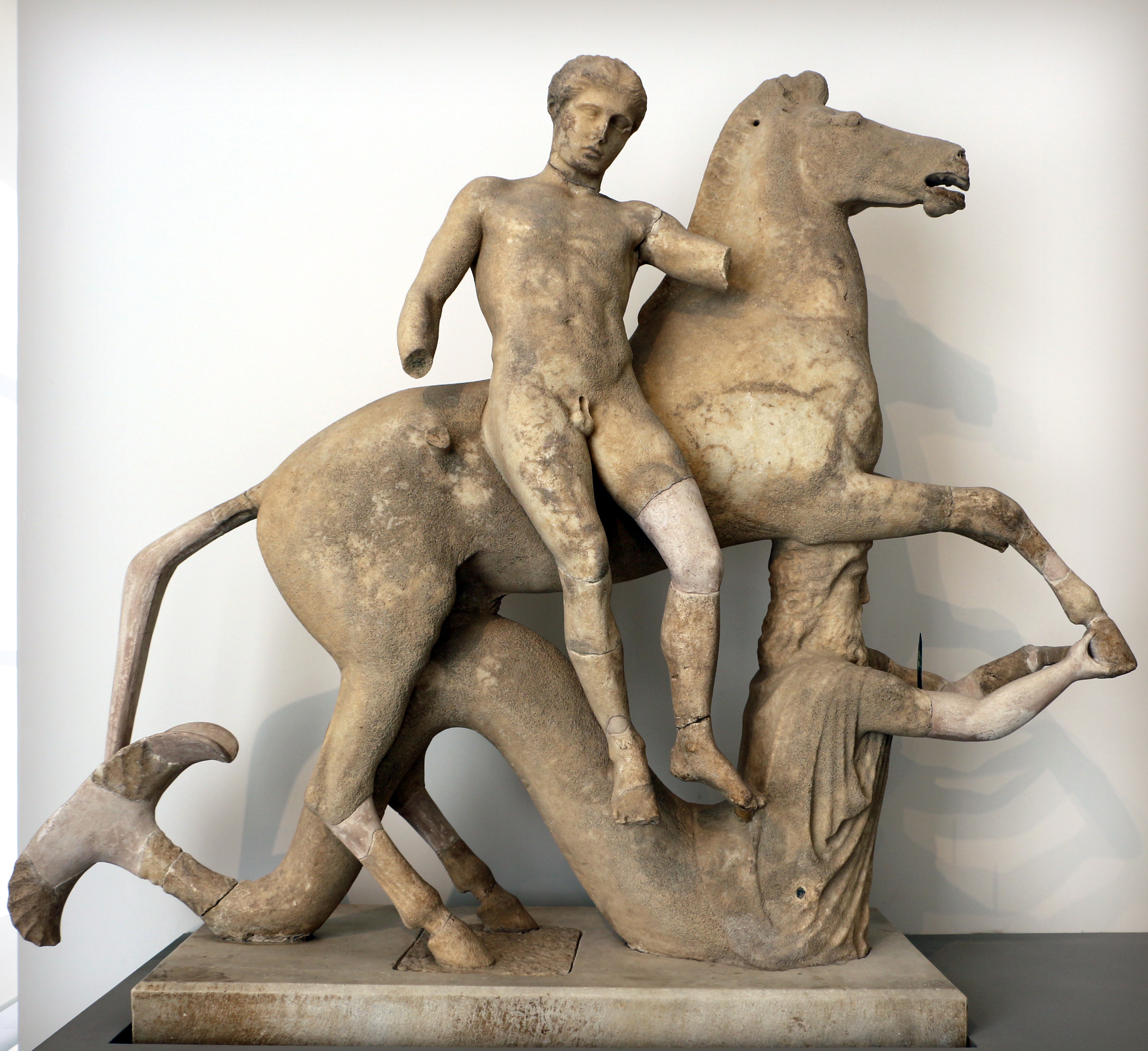
The Dioscuri on horseback supported by Tritons, from the sanctuary of Marasà in Locri, c. 450–400 BC.

In the 6th century BC, the Locrians had a series of conflicts with the neighbouring tribes. Only the Opuntian Locrians are mentioned by Homer; they were the more ancient and the more civilized. The Ozolian Locrians, who are said to have been a colony of the former, are not mentioned in history until the time of the Peloponnesian War, and are even then represented as a semi-barbarous people. They suffered a defeat from Corinth. The Opuntian Locrians are mentioned to have taken part in the battle of Thermopylae between the Greeks and the Persians.

In his History of Rome, Livy includes the Locri and other Greek cities among the defectors during the Punic Wars, even though they had initially opposed Hannibal in 216 BC. The Locri surrendered to Hannibal in 215 BC and were given peace by his order. They were permitted to live in freedom, keep control of their harbour, and be governed by their own laws. Their city was expected to be open to the Carthagenians, and their alliance was based on mutual commitment for support during peace and war. The Locri finally made peace with Rome in 204 BC.

In the 3rd century BC, they joined the Aetolian league.

== Dialect ==
Map of Ancient Greek dialects; the areas of Locrian distribution are included in the broader Northwest Greek group.

The Locrians spoke a Northwest dialect of Ancient Greek, known today as Locrian. It belonged to the Doric dialectal group and it was roughly divided into two varieties in accordance to their tribal distribution; the Ozolian branch along the northwest coast of the Gulf of Corinth around Amfissa, and the Opuntian branch on the coast of mainland Greece opposite northwest Euboea, around Opus. Unlike some other Northwest varieties, that are not so well known from a dialectal point of view, Locrian, along with Phocian, is generally considered to be a well–attested and recognizable dialect.

== Notable Locrians ==
=== Mythology ===
- Ajax the Lesser
- Patroclus

== See also ==
- Municipality of Lokroi
- Ozolian Locris
- Opuntian Locris
- Locri in Italy, Magna Graecia

== Sources ==
- Crespo, Emilio; Giannakis, Georgios; Filos, Panagiotis (2017). Studies in Ancient Greek Dialects, From Central Greece to the Black Sea. De Gruyter. ISBN 9783110532135.
- Dillon, Matthew; Garland, Lynda (2015). Ancient Rome, Social and Historical Documents from the Early Republic to the Death of Augustus. Taylor & Francis. ISBN 9781317485209.
