= Thronium (Locris) =

Ancient Greek town

Coordinates: 38°46′33″N 22°43′33″E

Thronium or Thronion (Ancient Greek: Θρόνιον) was an ancient Greek town, the chief town of the Locrians, situated 20 stadia from the coast and 30 stadia from Scarpheia, upon the Boagrius River, which is described by Strabo as sometimes dry, and sometimes flowing with a stream two plethra in breadth. It is mentioned in the Catalogue of Ships of the Iliad, by Homer, who speaks of it as near the river Boagrius.

At the beginning of the Peloponnesian War (431 BCE) Thronium was taken by the Athenians. It was at one time partly destroyed by an earthquake in 426 BCE. In the Third Sacred War it was taken by Onomarchus, the Phocian general, who sold its inhabitants into slavery, and hence it is called a Phocian city by the author of the Periplus of Pseudo-Scylax. Thronium is also mentioned by Polybius, Euripides, Livy, Pausanias, Lycophron, Ptolemy, Pliny the Elder, and Stephanus of Byzantium.

Along with Scarpheia, Thronium was one of only two towns of the Locri Epicnemidii to mint coins.

The site of Thronium is near a place called Palaiokastro eis ta marmara.

== See also ==
- Naming citation for Jovian asteroid 9799 Thronium
