= Larymna =

Larymna Λάρυμνα
- Community
- Location within Greece
- Coordinates: 38°34′N 23°17′E
- Country: Greece
- Administrative region: Central Greece
- Regional unit: Phthiotis
- Municipality: Lokroi
- Municipal unit: Opountioi
- Elevation: 5 m (16 ft)

Population (2021)
  - Community: 1,201
- Time zone: UTC+2 (EET)
  - Summer (DST): UTC+3 (EEST)
- Vehicle registration: ΜΙ

Larymna (Greek: Λάρυμνα) is a port town in Phthiotis, Greece. It is situated on the North Euboean Gulf. Since the 2011 local government reform, it is a part of the municipality Lokroi, of which it is a community. Larymna took its name from the ancient Boeotian port town Larymna, which was situated at the same place.

== History ==
Larymna was renamed after the name of an ancient city, which was divided between Upper Larymna (the more ancient part) and Lower Larymna (the harbour). The city had been also existed a harbour of Thebes, where Thebes was in apogee, during 4th century B.C.. The modern years, Larymna was a small village known also with the name Kastri. The name Kastri derives from the well-kept ancient wall in the coast. Larymna developed after the foundation of mining and metallurgical industry LARCO, opposite Larymna's port.

=== Historical population ===
Census	Settlement	Community
1991	842	
2001	1,087	1,495
2011	883	1,278
2021	776	1,201
