= Scarphe =

Town of the Epicnemidian Locrians

Coordinates: 38°48′11″N 22°39′25″E

Scarphe (Ancient Greek: Σκάρφη) or Scarpheia (Σκάρφεια) was a town of the Epicnemidian Locrians, mentioned by Homer in the Catalogue of Ships in the Iliad. According to Strabo it was 10 stadia from the sea, 30 stadia from Thronium, and a little less from some other place of which the name is lost, probably Nicaea. Moreover, Scarphe was reported to be occupying the territory of Augeiae, which had disappeared by his time. It appears from Pausanias that it lay on the direct road from Elateia to Thermopylae by Thronium, and likewise from Livy, who states that Lucius Quinctius Flamininus marched from Elateia by Thronium and Scarpheia to Heraclea. It was also the site of the Battle of Scarpheia in 146 BCE. Scarpheia is said by Strabo to have been destroyed by an inundation of the sea (tsunami) caused by an earthquake in 426 BCE, but it must have been afterwards rebuilt, as it is mentioned by subsequent writers down to a late period, including Pliny the Elder, Ptolemy, Hierocles, Stephanus of Byzantium, and the Geographer of Ravenna. Scarpheia is also mentioned by Lycophron, Appian, and Pausanias.

It was, together with Thronium, one of the only cities of Epicnemidian Locris that minted coins.

The site of the ancient town is tentatively identified as near Molos.
