= Halae =

Ancient Greek city in Boeotia

Coordinates: 38°39′30″N 23°11′23″E

Halae or Halai (Ancient Greek: Ἁλαί) was a town of ancient Locris, situated upon the Opuntian Gulf, but belonging to Boeotia in the time of Strabo and Pausanias. It is described by Pausanias as situated to the right of the Platanias River, and as the last town of Boeotia. It probably derived its name from some salt springs which are still found in its neighbourhood.

Its site is located near modern Theologos, where some ruins exist near the church of St. John.
