= Opus, Greece =

Ancient Greek city

Coordinates: 38°39′07″N 22°59′31″E

Opus /ˈoʊpəs/ (Ancient Greek: Ὀποῦς, romanized: Opoûs or Ὀπόεις) was an ancient Greek city that was the chief city of a tribe of Locri, who were called from this place the Opuntian Locrians, and the territory, the Opuntian Locris.

It was located on the coast of mainland Greece opposite Euboea, perhaps at modern Atalanti. Its harbor was at Kynos. It stood at the head of the Opuntian Gulf, a little inland, being 15 stadia from the shore according to Strabo, or only a mile according to Livy. Opus was believed to be one of the most ancient towns in Greece. Pindar's ninth Olympian ode concerns Opus. It was said to have been founded by Opus, a son of Locrus and Protogeneia; and in its neighbourhood Deucalion and Pyrrha were reported to have resided. It was the native city of Patroclus, and it is mentioned in the Homeric Catalogue of Ships as one of the Locrian towns whose troops were led by Ajax the Lesser, son of Oileus the king of Locris, in the Iliad There were games called Aiantea and an altar at Opus in honor of Ajax.

During the flourishing period of Greek history, it was regarded as the chief city of the eastern Locrians, for the distinction between the Opuntii and Epicnemidii is not made either by Herodotus, Thucydides, or Polybius. Even Strabo, from whom the distinction is chiefly derived, in one place describes Opus as the capital of the Epicnemidii; and the same is confirmed by Pliny and Stephanus of Byzantium. The Opuntii joined Leonidas with all their forces at the Battle of Thermopylae, and sent seven ships to the Greek fleet at Battle of Artemisium (480 BCE). Subsequently they belonged to the anti-Athenian party in Greece. Accordingly, after the conquest of Boeotia by the Athenians, which followed the Battle of Oenophyta, in 456 BCE, the Athenians carried off 100 of the richest Opuntians as hostages. In the Peloponnesian War the Opuntian privateers annoyed the Athenian trade, and it was in order to check them that the Athenians fortified the small island of Atalanta off the Opuntian coast. In the war between Antigonus and Cassander, Opus espoused the cause of the latter, and was therefore besieged by Ptolemy, the general of Antigonus. In 198 BCE, during the Second Macedonian War they went over to the Romans.

The site of Opus is near the modern town of Atalanti.

== See also ==
- List of ancient Greek cities
- Opuntia (Plant Genus named after the city of Opus)
