= Opuntian Locris =

Ancient Greek region

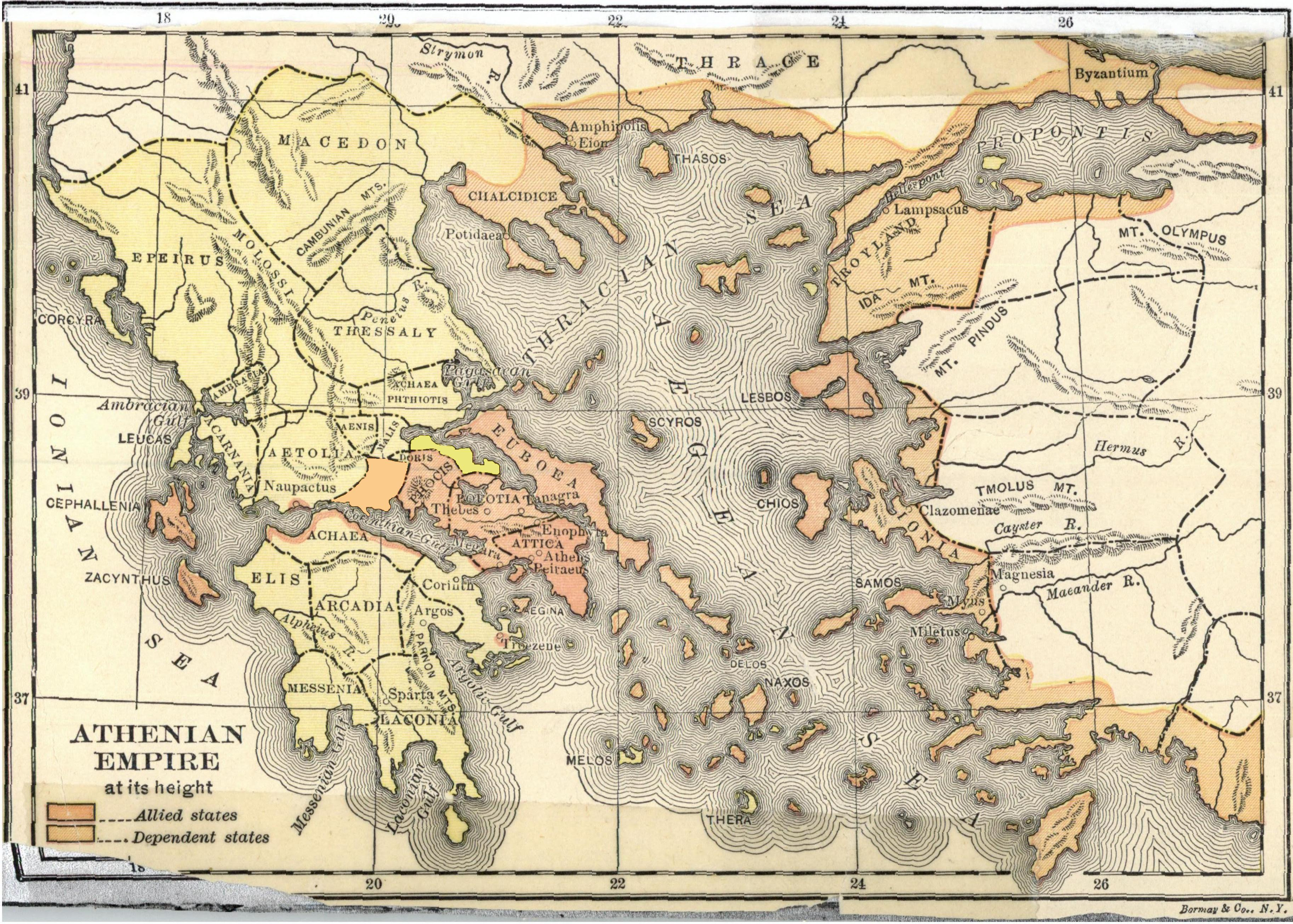
Opuntian Locris Ozolian Locris

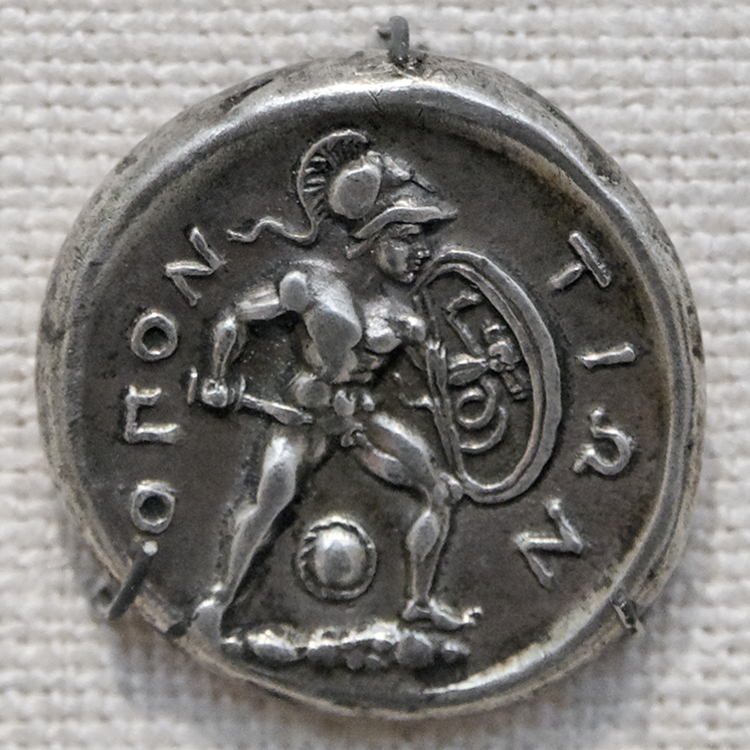
Reverse of a silver stater of Opuntian Locris depicting Ajax the Lesser.

Opuntian Locris or Eastern Locris was an ancient Greek region inhabited by the eastern division of the Locrians, the so-called tribe of the Locri Epicnemidii (Greek: Λοκροὶ Ἐπικνημίδιοι) or Locri Opuntii (Greek: Λοκροὶ Ὀπούντιοι).

== Geography ==
Opuntian Locris consisted of a narrow slip upon the eastern coast of central Greece, from the pass of Thermopylae to the mouth of the river Cephissus. The northern frontier town was Alpeni, which bordered upon the Malians, and the southern frontier town was Larymna, which at a later time belonged to Boeotia. The Locrians, however, did not inhabit this coast continuously, but were separated by a narrow slip of Phocis, which extended to the North Euboean Gulf, and contained the Phocian seaport town of Daphnus. The Locrians north of Daphnus were called Epicnemidii, from Mount Cnemis; and those south of this town were named Opuntii, from Opus, their principal city. On the west, the Locrians were separated from Phocis and Boeotia by a range of mountains, extending from Mount Oeta and running parallel to the coast. The northern part of this range, called Mount Cnemis, now Talanda, rises to a considerable height, and separated the Epicnemidii Locri from the Phocians of the upper valley of the Cephissus; the southern portion, which bore no specific name, is not so lofty as Mount Cnemis, and separated the Opuntian Locrians from the north-eastern parts of Boeotia. Lateral branches extended from these mountains to the coast, of which one terminated in the promontory Cnemides, opposite the islands called Lichades; but there were several fruitful valleys, and the fertility of the whole of the Locrian coast is praised both by ancient and modern observers. In consequence of the proximity of the mountains to the coast there was no room for any considerable rivers. The largest, which, however, is only a mountain torrent, is the Boagrius (Βοάγριος), called also Manes (Μάνης) by Strabo, rising in Mount Cnemis, and flowing into the sea between Scarpheia and Thronium. The only other river mentioned by name is the Platanius, a small stream, which flows into the Opuntian gulf near the Boeotian frontier: it is the river which flows from the modern village of Proskyná.

=== Opuntian Gulf ===
The Opuntian Gulf, at the head of which stood the town of Opus, is a considerable bay, shallow at its inner extremity. In this bay, close to the coast, is the small island of Atalanta.

== History ==
The Eastern Locrians, are mentioned by Homer, who describes them as following Ajax, the son of Oïleus, to the Trojan War in forty ships, and as inhabiting the towns of Kynos, Opus, Calliarus, Besa, Scarphe, Augeiae, Tarphe, and Thronium. Neither Homer, Herodotus, Thucydides, nor Polybius, make any distinction between the Opuntii and Epicnemidii; and, during the flourishing period of Greek history, Opus was regarded as the chief town of the Eastern Locrians. Even Strabo, from whom the distinction is chiefly derived, in one place describes Opus as the metropolis of the Epicnemidii (ix. p. 416); and the same is confirmed by Pliny (iv. 7. s. 12) and Stephanus. In the Persian War the Opuntian Locrians fought with Leonidas at the Battle of Thermopylae, and also sent seven ships to the Greek fleet. The Locrians fought on the side of Sparta in the Peloponnesian War. The Locri Opuntii also minted coins in antiquity, some of which survive. A number of authors refer to earthquakes which occurred in the area in 426 BC, causing significant damage.

== Cities and towns ==
The cities and towns of the Locri Epicnemidii, along the coast from north to south, were: Alpenus, Nicaea, Scarphe (Scarpheia), Thronium, Cnemis (Cnemides), more inland, Tarphe later Pharygae, and Augeiae. The cities and towns of the Locri Opuntii, along the coast from north to south, were: Alope, Kynos, Opus, Halae, Larymna which later belonged to Boeotia, more inland, Calliarus, Naryx, and Corseia.

== See also ==
- Regions of ancient Greece
- Locris
