= Oeantheia =

Town of the Ozolian Locrians

Coordinates: 38°22′02″N 22°11′39″E

Oeantheia or Oiantheia (Ancient Greek: Οἰάνθεια) or Oeanthe (Οἰάνθη) or Euanthis (Εὐανθίς) or Euanthia (Εὐανθία) was an important town of the Ozolian Locrians, situated at the western entrance of the Crissaean Gulf. Polybius says that it is opposite to Aegeira in Achaea. Thucydides relates that during the Peloponnesian War, the Oeanthians are among several towns of the Locri Ozolae that were forced to provide hostages to the Lacedaemonian army in 426 BCE. The Periplus of Pseudo-Scylax calls the town Euanthis; and since Strabo says that Epizephyrian Locris in Italy was founded by the Ozolian Locrians, under a leader named Euanthes, it has been conjectured that Oeantheia or Euantheia was the place where the emigrants embarked. Oeantheia appears to have been the only maritime city in Locris remaining in the time of Pausanias (2nd century), with the exception of Naupactus. The only objects at Oeantheia mentioned by Pausanias were a temple of Aphrodite, and one of Artemis, situated in a grove above the town. The town is mentioned in the Tabula Peutingeriana as situated 20 miles (32 km) from Naupactus and 15 (24) from Anticyra.

The site of Oeantheia is located near modern Tolofon, although others still contend the site is near Glyfada.
