= Oileus =

Mythical father of Ajax the Lesser

In Greek mythology, Oileus or Oïleus (/oʊˈaɪliːəs, -juːs/; Ancient Greek: Ὀϊλεύς, romanized: Oī̈leús) was the king of Locris, and an Argonaut.

== Family ==
Oileus's father was given as Hodoedocus (whom Oileus succeeded as King of Locris) and his mother as Agrianome (daughter of Perseon), according to Hyginus's Fabulae. Oileus is best known as the father of Ajax the Lesser. There is disagreement as to the name of Ajax's mother: Homer names Eriopis as the legal wife of Oileus, but scholiasts cite other authors, some of whom agreed with Homer in considering Eriopis (or Eriope) the mother of Ajax, but others stated that the mother of Ajax by Oileus was Alcimache, and yet others asserted that Alcimache was simply another name for Eriopis. John Tzetzes listed three alternate options: Eriopis, Alcimache, or Astyoche the daughter of Itylus. Oileus was also the father of Medon, who is usually regarded as illegitimate; Medon's mother was said to be a nymph named Rhene, though some gave Alcimache as his mother. According to Hyginus, Rhene was the mother of Ajax as well.

== Mythology ==
In Apollonius Rhodius' Argonautica, Oileus gets wounded in the shoulder during the attack of the Stymphalian Birds on the Argo and receives aid from Eribotes.

Oileus was also the name of a defender of Troy, the charioteer of Bienor, killed by Agamemnon.
