= Ajax the Lesser =

Ancient Greek mythological hero

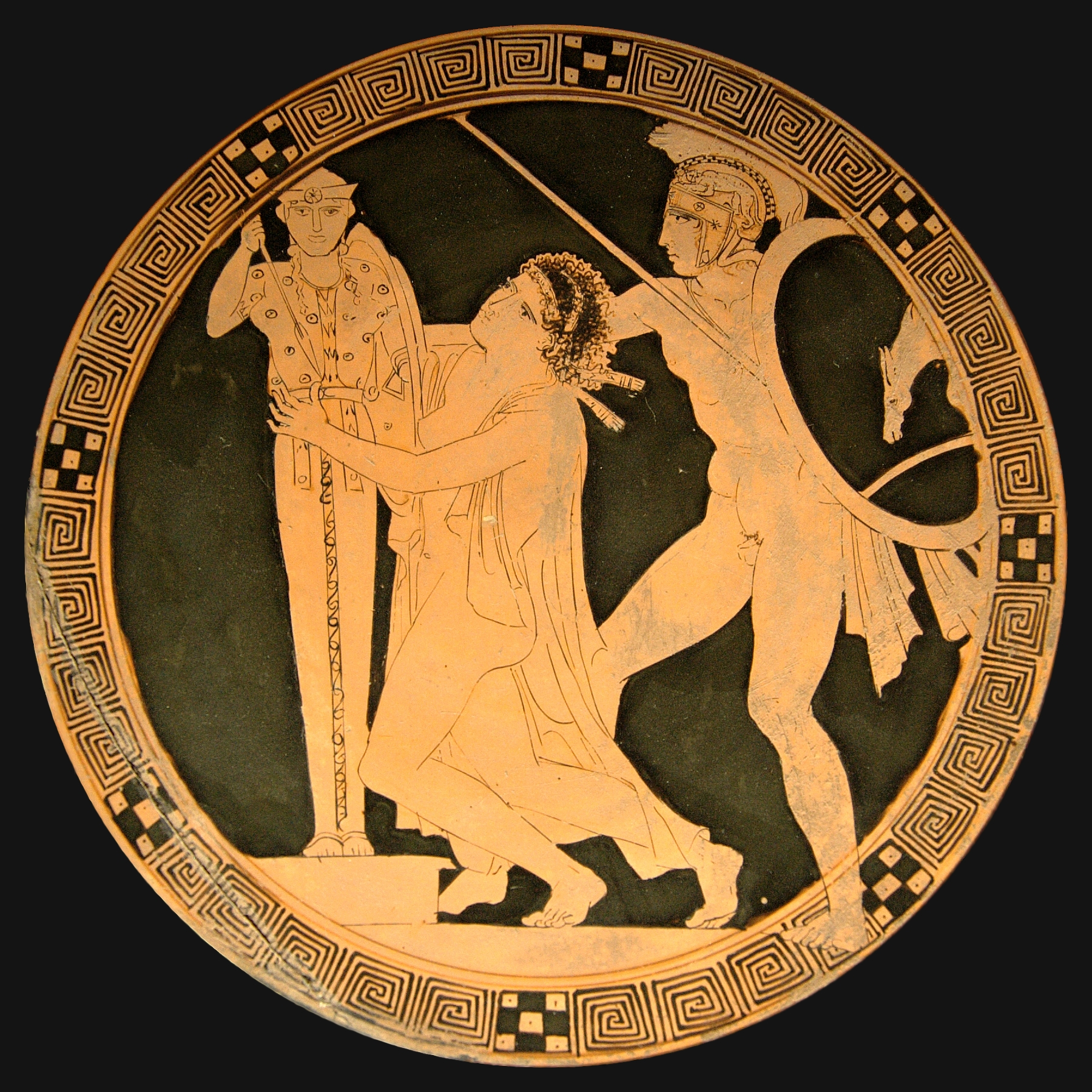
Ajax the Lesser and Cassandra on an Attic-red figure cup, Louvre.

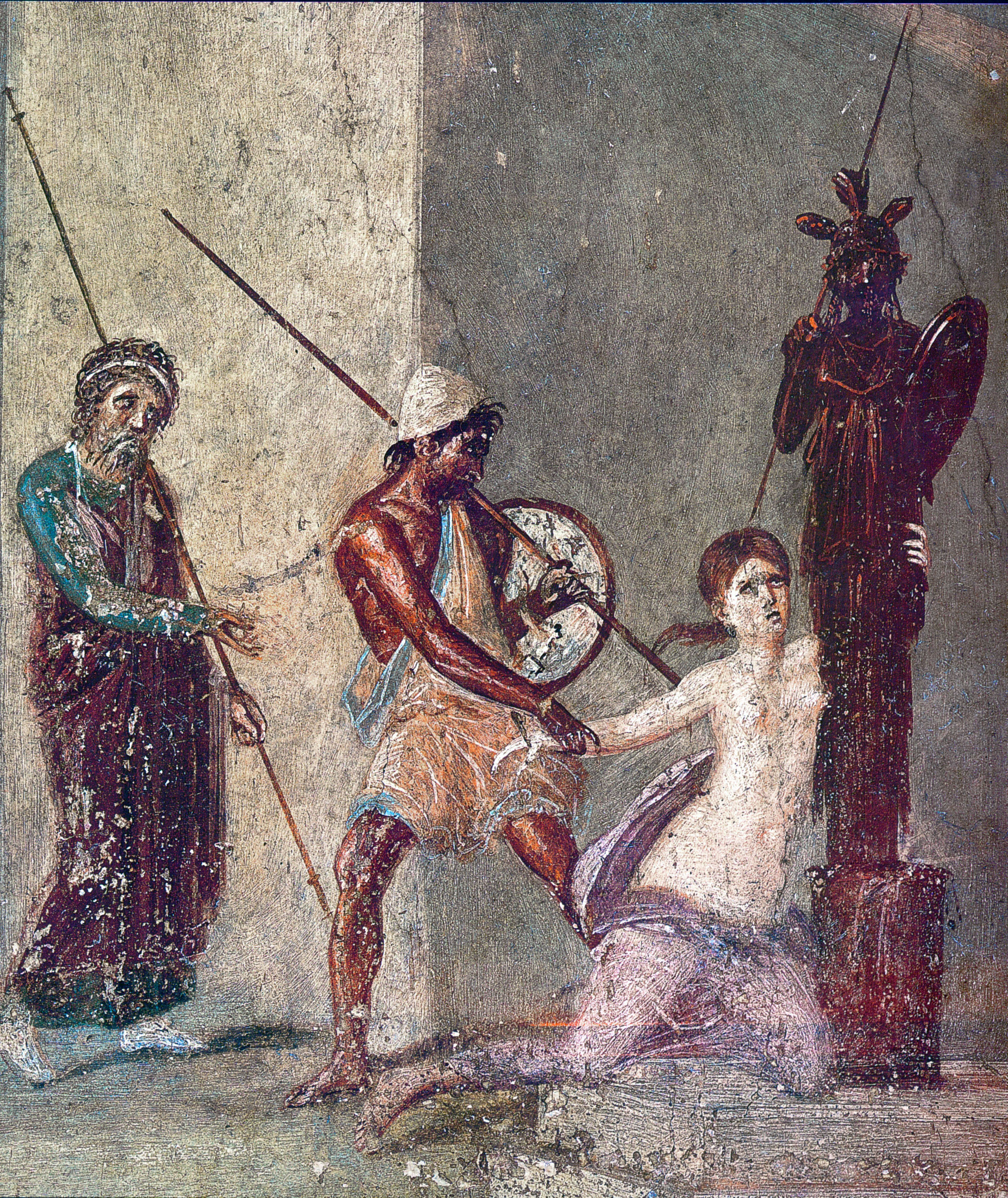
Scene from the Trojan War: Cassandra clings to the Palladium, the wooden cult image of Athene, while Ajax the Lesser is about to drag her away in front of her father Priam (standing on the left). Fresco from the atrium of the Casa del Menandro (I 10, 4) in Pompeii.

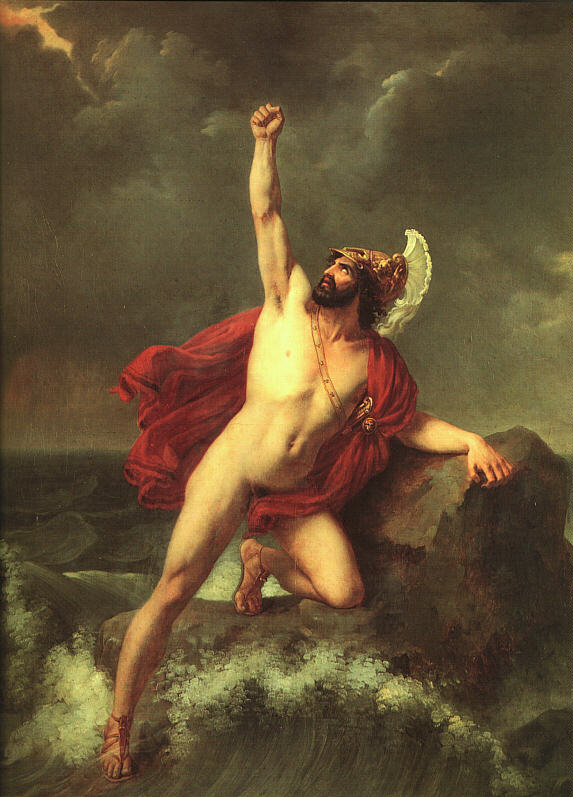
Ajax, 1820 painting by Henri Serrur

Ajax (Ancient Greek: Αἴας, romanized: Aíās) was a Greek mythological hero, son of Oileus, the king of Locris. He was called the "Ajax the Less", the "lesser" or "Locrian" Ajax, to distinguish him from Ajax the Great, son of Telamon. He was the leader of the Locrian contingent during the Trojan War. He is a significant figure in Homer's Iliad and is also mentioned in the Odyssey, in Virgil's Aeneid and in Euripides' The Trojan Women. In Etruscan legend, he was known as Aivas Vilates.

== Description ==
In the account of Dares the Phrygian, Ajax was described as "stocky, powerfully built, swarthy, a pleasant person, and brave." Philostratus mentions that he had long hair, and had a pet snake "five cubits long, who drank with [him] and accompanied him, either leading the way or following him like a dog."

== Mythology ==
=== Life ===
Ajax's mother's name was Eriopis. According to Strabo, he was born in Naryx in Locris, where Ovid calls him Narycius heros. According to the Iliad, he led his Locrians in forty ships against Troy. He is described as one of the great heroes among the Greeks. In battle, he wore a linen cuirass (λινοθώραξ, linothorax), was brave and intrepid, especially skilled in throwing the spear and, next to Achilles, the swiftest of all the Greeks. The chronicler Malalas portrayed him as "tall, strong, tawny, squinting, good nose, curly hair, black hair, thick beard, long face, daring warrior, magnanimous, a womanizer."

In the funeral games at the pyre of Patroclus, Ajax contended with Odysseus and Antilochus for the prize in the footrace; but Athena, who was hostile towards him and favored Odysseus, made him stumble and fall, so that he won only the second prize.

In later traditions, this Ajax is called a son of Oileus and the nymph Rhene, and is also mentioned among the suitors of Helen. After the taking of Troy, he rushed into the temple of Athena, where Cassandra had taken refuge, and was embracing the statue of the goddess in supplication. Ajax violently dragged her away to the other captives. According to some writers, he raped Cassandra inside the temple. Odysseus called for Ajax's death by stoning for this crime, but Ajax saved himself by claiming innocence with an oath to Athena, clutching her statue in supplication.

=== Death ===
Since Ajax dragged the supplicant from her temple, Athena had cause to be indignant. According to the Bibliotheca, no one was aware that Ajax had raped Cassandra until Calchas, the Greek seer, warned the Greeks that Athena was furious at the treatment of her priestess and she would destroy the Greek ships if they did not kill him immediately. Despite this, Ajax managed to hide at the altar of a deity where the Greeks, fearing divine retribution should they kill him and destroy the altar, allowed him to live. When the Greeks left without killing Ajax, despite their sacrifices, Athena became so angry that she persuaded Zeus to send a storm that sank many of their ships.

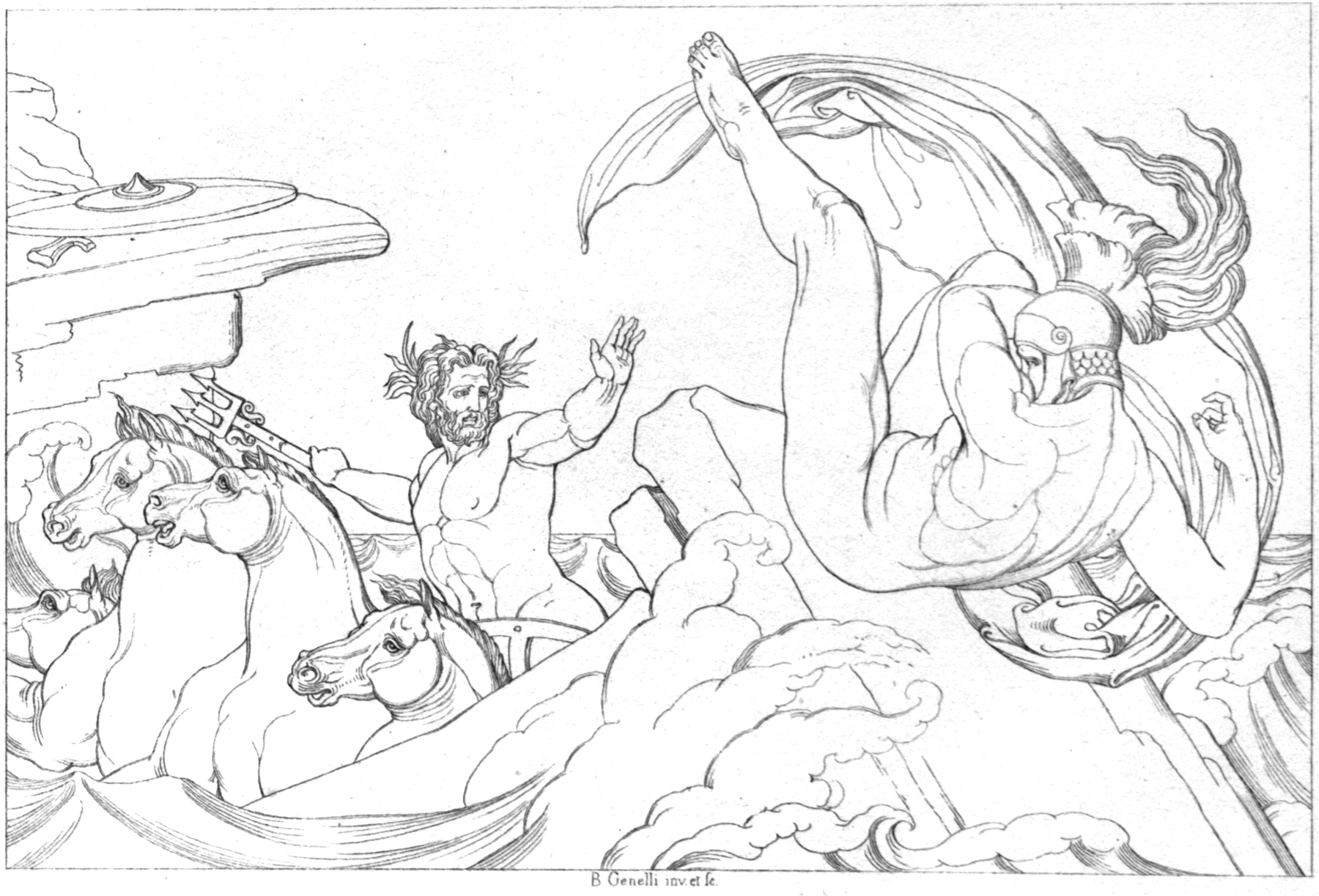
Poseidon killing Ajax the Lesser, drawing by Bonaventura Genelli

As Ajax was returning from Troy, Athena hit his ship with a thunderbolt and the vessel was wrecked on the Whirling Rocks (Γυραὶ πέτραι). But he escaped with some of his men, managing to cling onto a rock through the assistance of Poseidon. He would have been saved in spite of Athena, but he then audaciously declared that he would escape the dangers of the sea in defiance of the immortals. Offended by this presumption, Poseidon split the rock with his trident and Ajax was swallowed up by the sea. Thetis buried him when the corpse washed up on Mykonos. Other versions depict a different death for Ajax, showing him dying when on his voyage home. In these versions, when Ajax came to the Capharean Rocks on the coast of Euboea, his ship was wrecked in a fierce storm, he himself was lifted up in a whirlwind and impaled with a flash of rapid fire from Athena in his chest, and his body thrust upon sharp rocks, which afterwards were called the rocks of Ajax.

After Ajax's death, his spirit dwelt in the island of Leuce. The Opuntian Locrians worshipped Ajax as their national hero, and so great was their faith in him that when they drew up their army in battle, they always left one place open for him, believing that, although invisible to them, he was fighting for and among them. The story of Ajax was frequently made use of by ancient poets and artists, and the hero who appears on some Locrian coins with the helmet, shield, and sword is probably this Ajax.

Other accounts of Ajax's death are offered by Philostratus, Euripides, and the scholiast on Lycophron.

== Art ==
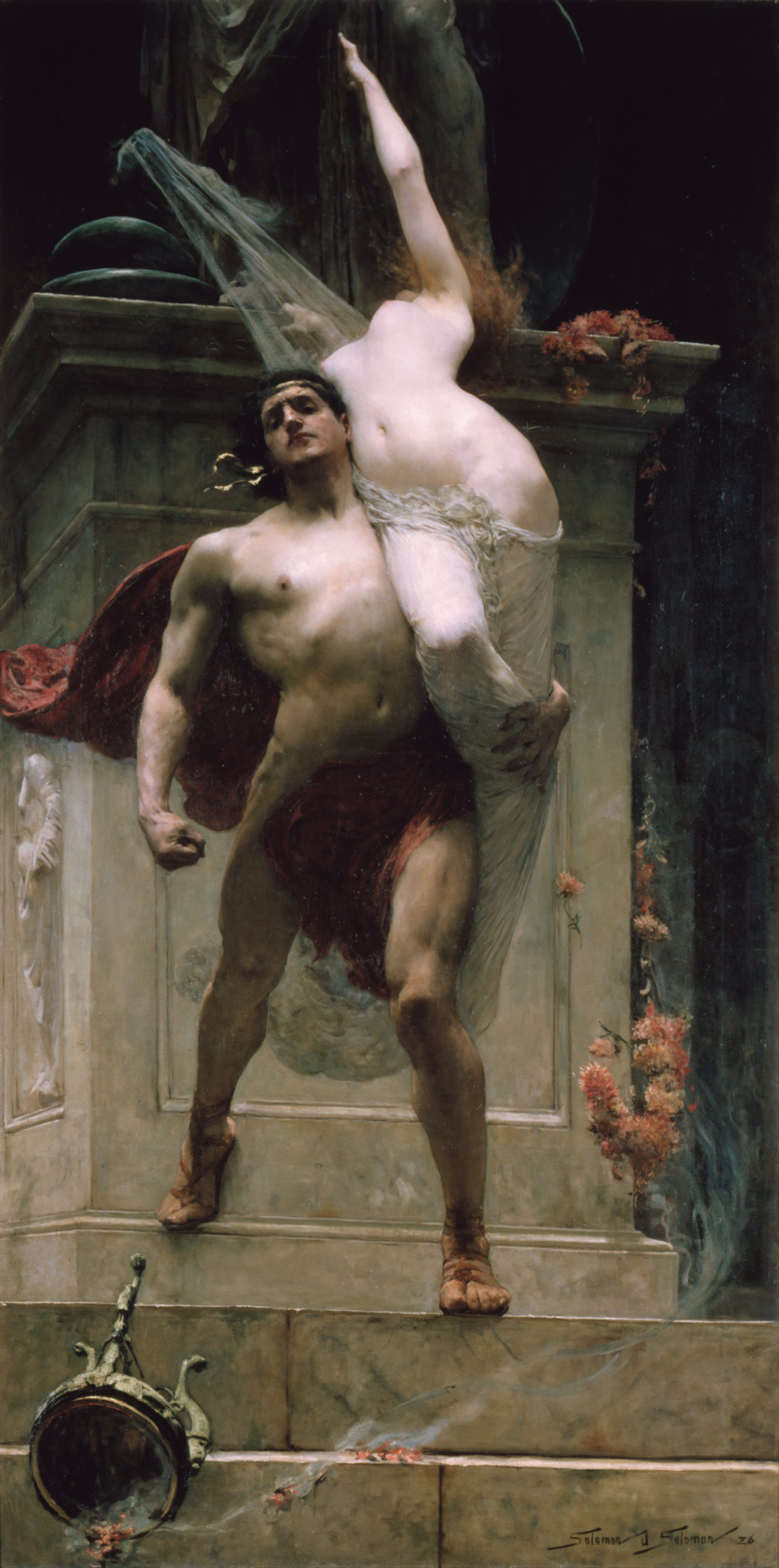
Ajax and Cassandra by Solomon Joseph Solomon (1886)

The abduction of Cassandra by Ajax was frequently represented in Greek works of art, such as the chest of Cypselus described by Pausanias and in extant works.
