= Locris =

Locris Λοκρίς
- Region of Ancient Greece
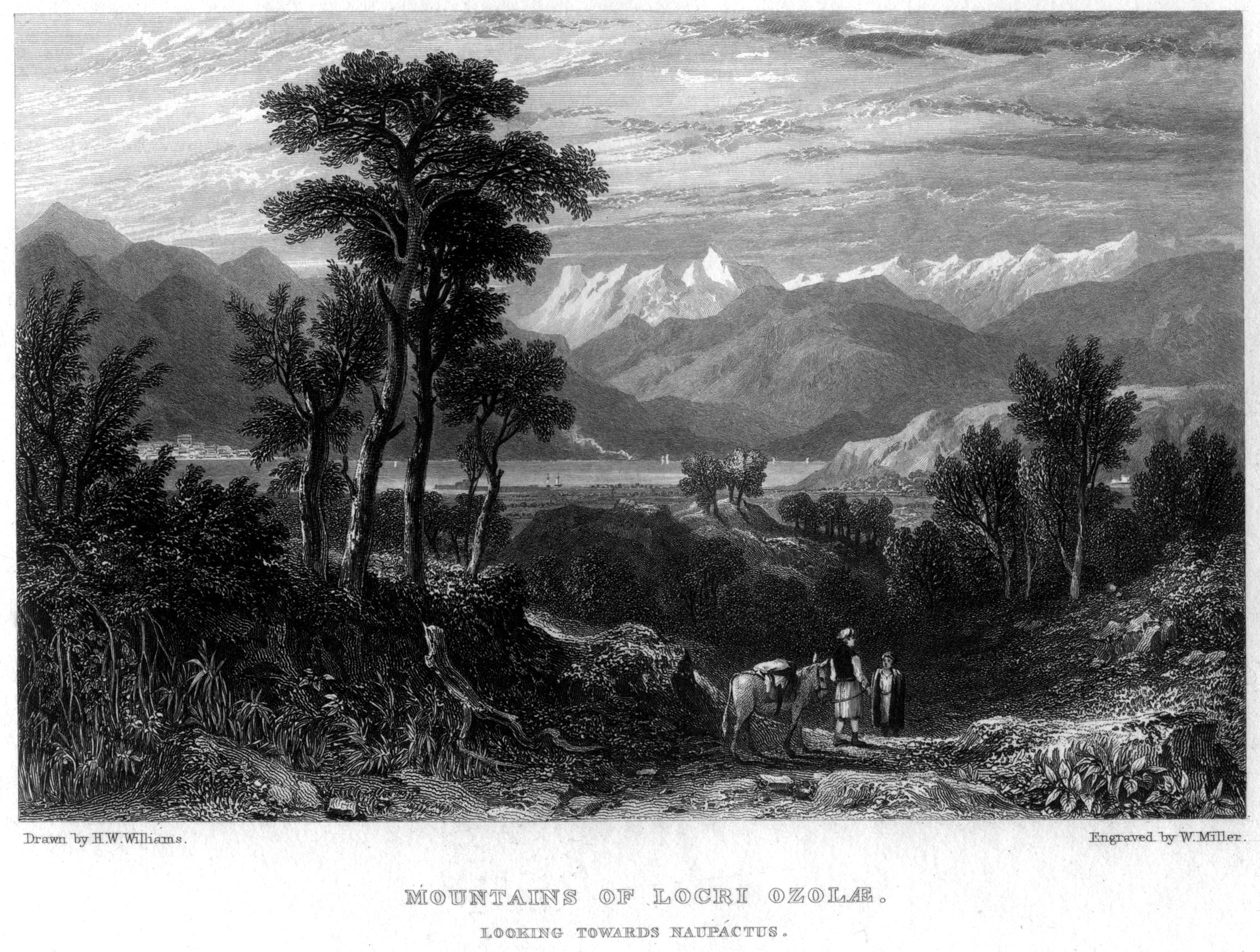
- The mountains of Ozolian Locris, looking towards Naupactus, engraving by the Scottish artist Hugh William Williams

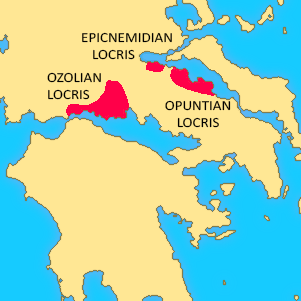
- Map showing the location of Locris.
- Location: Central Greece
- Major cities: Amphissa, Naupactus
- Dialects: Doric

Locris (/ˈloʊkrɪs, ˈlɒk-/; Modern Greek: Λοκρίδα, romanized: Lokrída; Ancient Greek: Λοκρίς, romanized: Lokrís) was a region of ancient Greece, the homeland of the Locrians, made up of three distinct districts.

== Locrian tribe ==
The city of Locri in Calabria (Italy), also known in antiquity as "Epizephyrian Locris", was a colony founded by the Locrians in Magna Graecia. There is some disagreement over whether it was those from Opuntian Locris or from Ozolian Locris who were responsible.

== Ancient Locris ==
The territory of the Locrians was divided into three by Doris and Phocis, perhaps due to an early invasion of a contiguous Locrian state. This fact, combined with the region's infertility, meant that the Locrians tended to be dominated by their neighbours, and played little part in Greek history.

To the south-west of Phocis was Ozolian Locris, situated on the north coast of the Gulf of Corinth, between Naupactus and Crisa. The main cities of Ozolian Locris were Amphissa and Naupactus which was its seaport. To the north east of Phocis was Opuntian Locris, named after its main city, Opus. Finally, to the north of Phocis was Epicnemidian Locris, situated near the pass of Thermopylae.

The Opuntian Locris and the Epicnemidian Locris are often regarded as one people, separate in customs and integration to the Hellenic culture from the Ozolian Locris, considered as the less civilised of the two. The territories of the Opuntian Locris and the Epicnemidian Locris were not a continuous unit but were separated from one another by Phocis and Doris.

=== Ozolian Locris ===
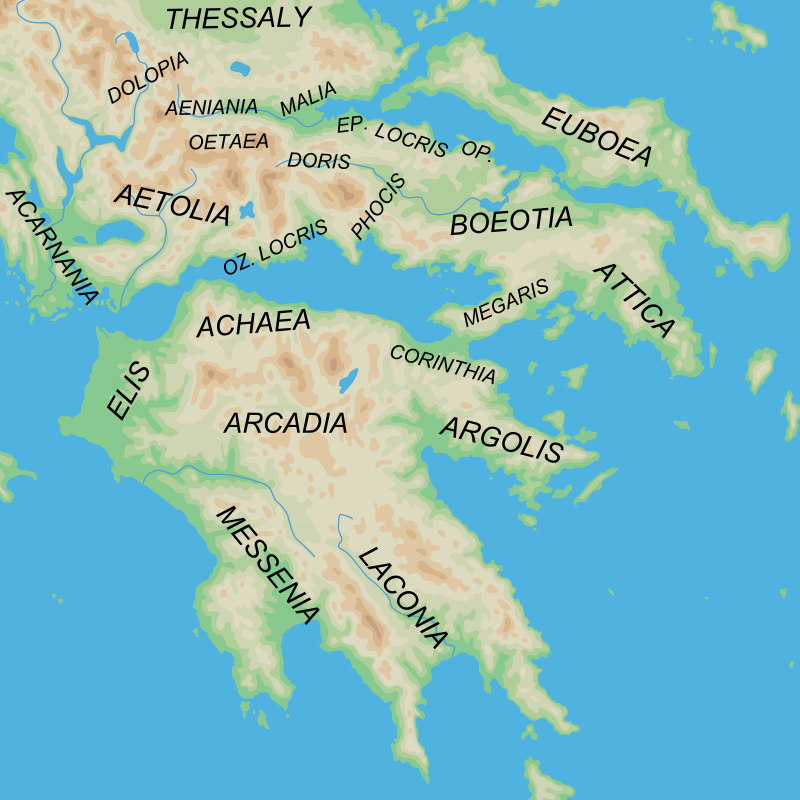
Location of Locris in relation to other regions.

The main towns of Ozolian Locris were Amphissa and Naupactus. Today, most of the area is part of Phocis, while Naupactus is part of Aetolia-Acarnania.

=== Opuntian Locris ===
The main towns of Opuntia Locris were Opus and Larymna. Today, Opuntian Locris is part of modern Phthiotis.

=== Epicnemidian Locris ===
The main towns of Epicnemidian Locris were Nicaea and Thronium. Today, Epicnemidian Locris is part of modern Phthiotis.

== Province ==
The province of Locris (Greek: Επαρχία Λοκρίδας) was one of the provinces of the Phthiotis Prefecture. Its capital was the town Atalanti. Its territory corresponded with that of the current municipalities Amfikleia-Elateia, Lokroi, and Kamena Vourla. It was abolished in 2006. Amfissa is now the capital of the regional unit of Phocis.
