= Epsilon TV =

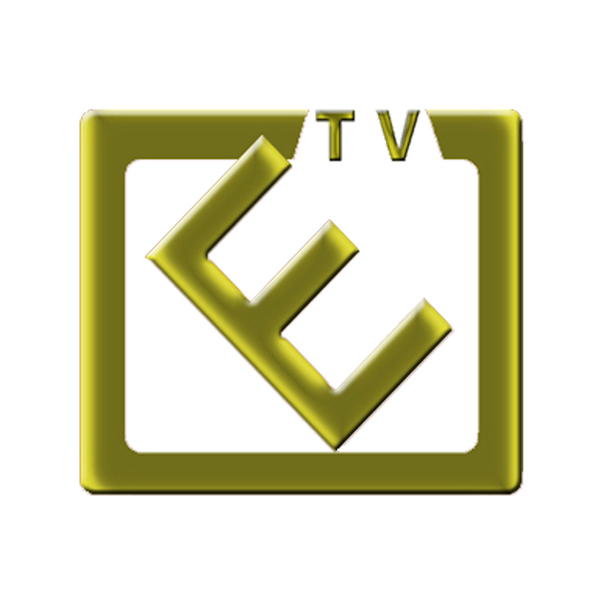
- The logo for Epsilon TV
- Country: Greece
- Broadcast area: Central Greece & Euboea
- Headquarters: Livadeia

Programming
- Picture format: 576i (4:3 SDTV)

Ownership
- Owner: Boeotian Broadcasting - ETV SA

History
- Launched: August 20, 1995

Links
- Website: Official Website

Availability

Terrestrial
- Digea: 42 UHF (Chlomo, Lichada, Damasta, Atalanti, Lidoriki, Parnitha, Distomo); 36 UHF (Krikello, Fragkista, Domnista, Potamia)

Streaming media
- Epsilon TV: Live streaming

Epsilon TV or ETV, in Greek: Έψιλον Τηλεόραση (alternative romanization: Epsilon Tileorasi), is one of the three legal terrestrial TV channels of the region of Central Greece and Euboea, based in the city of Livadeia.

== History ==
Epsilon TV was founded in 1995 by former Minister Aristides Tsiplakos and the productive classes of Boeotia. In 2004, it maintained studios in Athens (Galatsi), and then Chalcis in 2007.

== Channel broadcast ==
Epsilon TV, from 1995 until August 2014 was transmitting in analog from Parnitha (UHF CH22), from Chlomo (UHF CH51), from Profit Elias of Livadeia (UHF CH55) and from Mount Parnassus (UHF CH62). In 2008, Epsilon was approved for digital transmission, together with the two other television stations of the same region (Ena TV and Star Channel). Starting in August of 2014, its digital transmission from Parnitha and from November 2014, converted all its analog transmissions to digital mode. As of 2026, all the three TV channels of Central Greece are transmitting in digital from the Channels 42 and 36 UHF/SFN, to all of Central Greece and Euboea island, including a part of Athens. however, they broadcast with very weak signal, because its transmission from Parnitha is beaming Euboea.

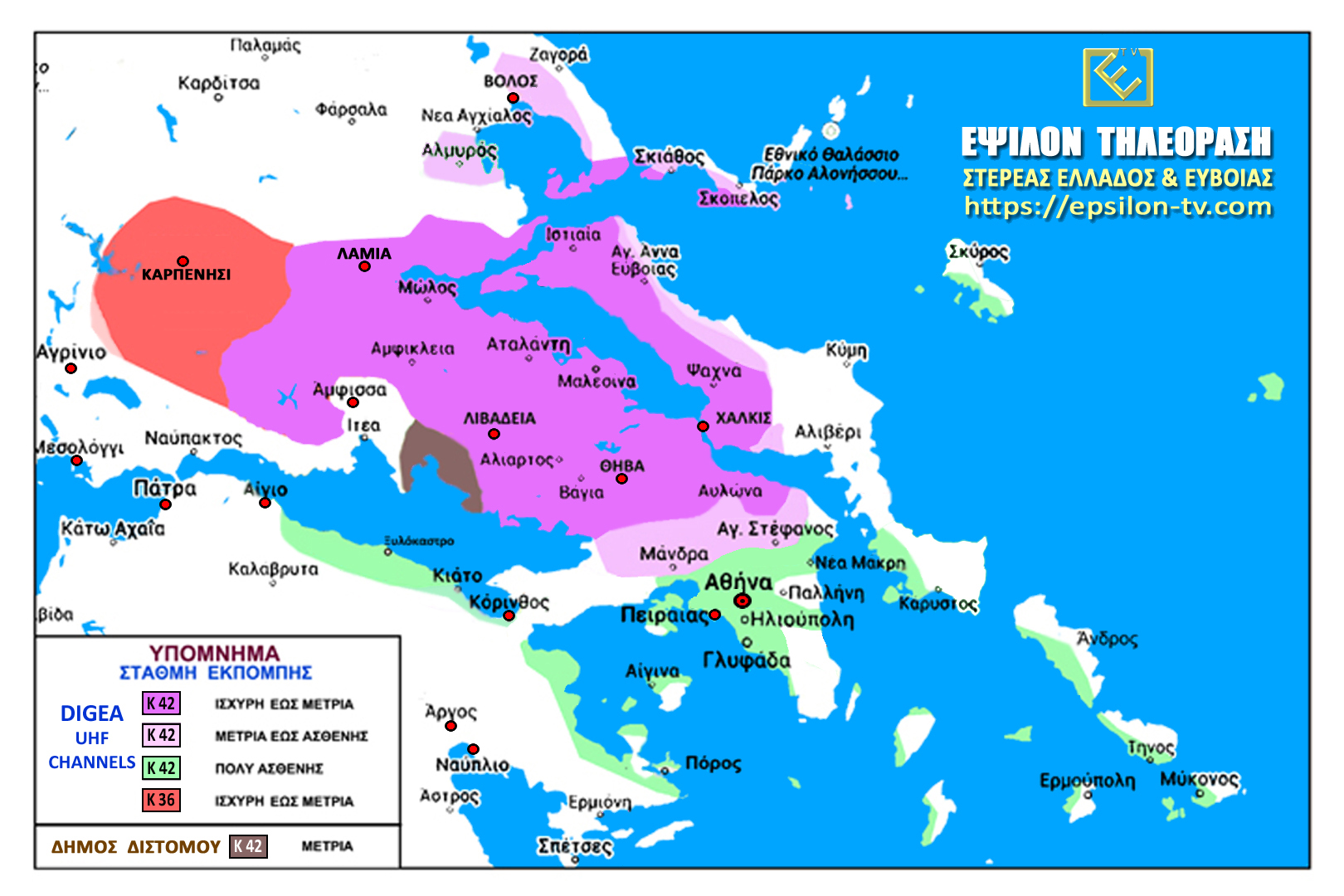

== Ownership ==
- John E. Pantazopoulos, Telecommunication Engineer D.Sc.: 25.00% (CEO)
- Panagiotis E. Angelopoulos: 25.00%
- Ioannis K. Papaloukas: 25.00%
- Spyridon Ch. Vlachos: 25.00%
