= Kyrtoni =

Kyrtoni Κυρτώνη
- Community
- Location within Greece
- Coordinates: 38°35′11″N 23°2′21″E
- Country: Greece
- Administrative region: Central Greece
- Regional unit: Phthiotis
- Municipality: Lokroi
- Municipal unit: Atalanti

Population (2021)
  - Community: 348
- Time zone: UTC+2 (EET)
  - Summer (DST): UTC+3 (EEST)

Kyrtoni (Greek: Κυρτώνη, before 1987: Κολάκα - Kolaka) is a village in the southeastern part of Phthiotis, Greece. It is part of the municipality of Lokroi since 2010. It was an independent commune between the 1820s and 1907, and was part the municipality of Atalanti between 1907 and 2010. In 2021 its population was 348. It is situated at 480 m elevation on the southern slope of the Chlomo mountain. It is 8 km southeast of Atalanti and 12 km northeast of Orchomenos. Its main industry is agriculture. The village takes its name from the ancient town Cyrtone.

== History ==
The area around Kyrtoni was already inhabited during the Neolithic era (7000-3200/3100 BC). The name of the Neolithic settlement is unknown. There was also activity around Kyrtoni during the Archaic period (800-480 BC). The main occupations of the inhabitants were agriculture, animal husbandry and pottery.

In the 2nd century CE, Pausanias described Cyrtones, also Cyrtone, as a town of ancient Boeotia situated east of Lake Copais, on a mountain 20 stades from Hyettus. It had a temple and a grove of Apollo, and a spring with sanctuary to the nymphs. Its location is a little east of the modern day village. The remains of the Castle of Kyrtones are located in the place called Pyrgos. This ancient fortification has a square tower made out of 1.5 m thick stones. From the ancient fountain now known as Kamini flows brackish, ice cold water with healing properties (for dysentery).

In the first years of Ottoman rule (1466) Kolaka had 47 households. In 1506, it had 50 Christian households and in 1521 52. In 1541, it rose to 61 and to 76 in 1576. In 1815, the traveller Argyris Filippidis wrote about Kolaka: "It had about 20 Christian houses. They grow wheat, barley and other grains, they drink wine, they have sheep and goats and they said they live well." Kolaka was home to three revolutionary leaders of the Greek War of Independence of 1821: Michalis Athanasiou, Argyris Anestis and Ioannis Dimou.

== Population ==
Historical population
Year	Pop.	±%
1879	168	—
1889	232	+38.1%
1896	243	+4.7%
1907	303	+24.7%
2001	476	+57.1%
2011	445	−6.5%
2021	348	−21.8%

== Sources ==
- Balta, E., Dakoronia, F., Kotoulas, D., Sythiakaki, B., Tolias, B., Lokrida - History & Culture (Λοκρίδα – Ιστορία & Πολιτισμός), Hatzimihali Publications
- Locrian Chronicles (Λοκρικά Χρονικά) 1997, Athens, Atalanti Historic and Folkloric Information Company (EILEA), Volume III
