= Lokroi =

Lokroi (Greek: Λοκροί) can refer to:

- the Locrians, an ancient Greek tribe
- Locris, a region of ancient Greece and a former province of Greece
- Locri, a town in Italy founded by Locrian colonists
- Lokroi (municipality), a municipality in Greece founded in 2011
