= Corsia (disambiguation) =

Corsia is a plant genus.

Corsia may also refer to:

- Corseia, town of ancient Boeotia, Greece
- Corsia (island), an island in the Aegean Sea, Greece
- Ted de Corsia, American actor
- Carbon Offsetting and Reduction Scheme for International Aviation (CORSIA)
