= Hyettus (Boeotia) =

Coordinates: 38°33′27″N 23°06′12″E

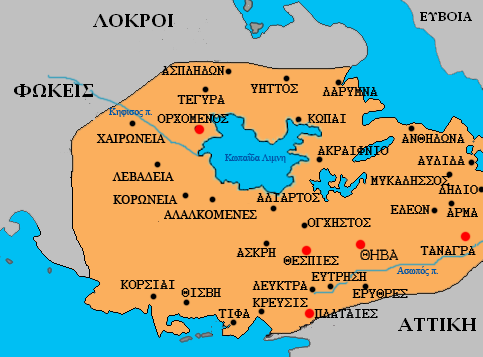
Map of Ancient Boeotia (in Greek)

Hyettus or Hyettos (Ancient Greek: Ὑηττός) was a village in ancient Boeotia, Greece. According to Pausanias, who visited the site in the 2nd century CE, it was located near Lake Copais, at 7 stadia from Olmones and 20 stades from Cyrtones. There was a temple of Heracles in the village, frequented by the sick for the cure of their diseases, with the deity worshiped in the form of a rude stone. An inscription built into the chapel of Agios Nikolaos south of the acropolis attests to a cult of Savior Asklepios in the 2nd century CE.

The village was founded by and named after the mythological figure Hyettus from Argos, who fled to this area after he killed his adulterous wife.

Its acropolis is located on a low hill, crowned by a chapel of Agios Athanasios, in a locality called Dendri, approximately three km NNE of the village of Pavlos, Viotias. On the west side of the acropolis, a stretch of polygonal fortification wall preserves a number of inscriptions of the 4th or 3rd century BCE listing young men serving in the local self-defense force. Also on the W slope are stalactite caves.
