= Zeli =

Zeli Ζέλι
- Community
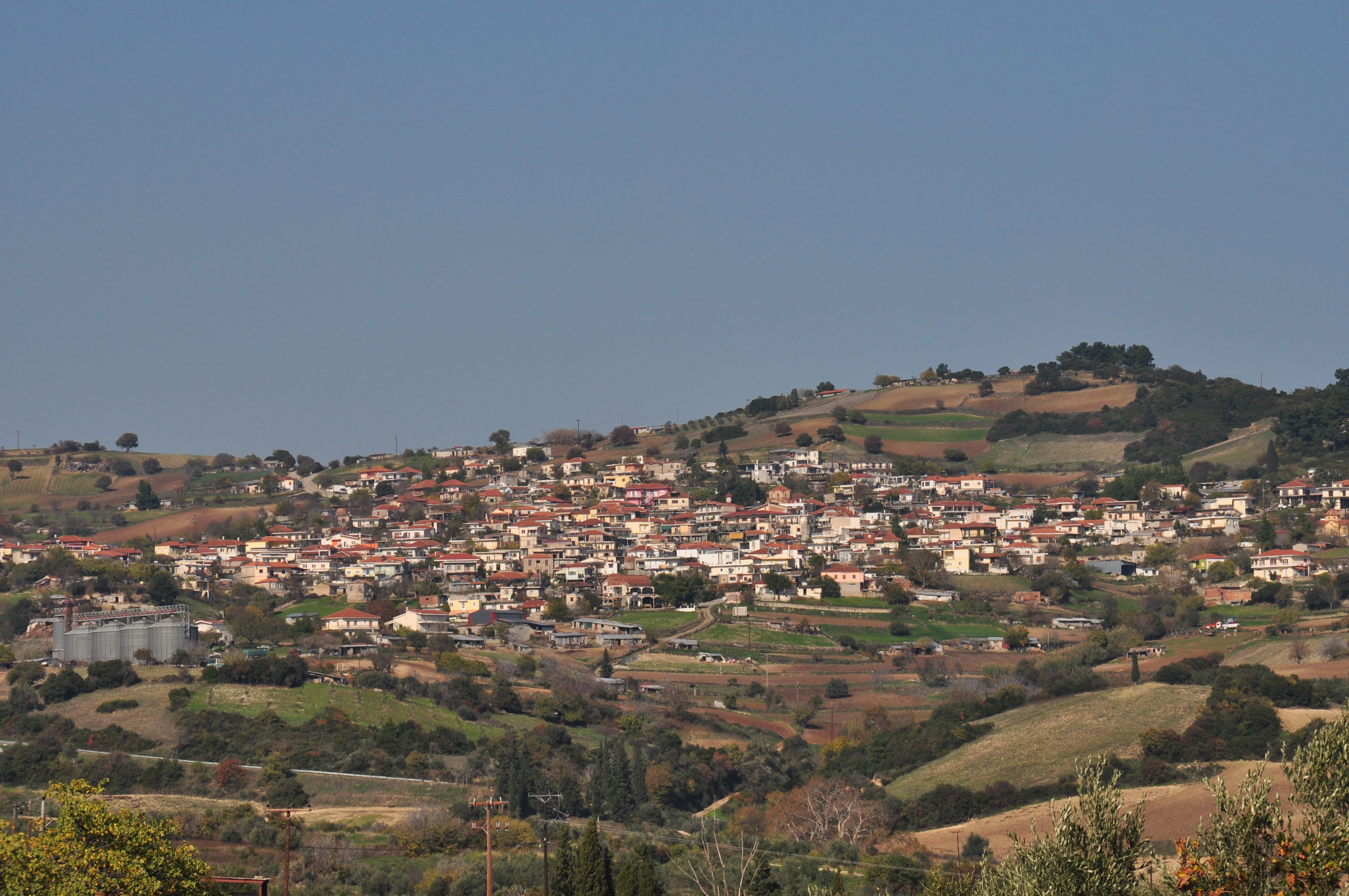

- Location within Greece
- Coordinates: 38°39′N 22°52′E
- Country: Greece
- Administrative region: Central Greece
- Regional unit: Phthiotis
- Municipality: Amfikleia–Elateia
- Municipal unit: Elateia
- Elevation: 510 m (1,670 ft)

Population (2021)
  - Community: 466
- Time zone: UTC+2 (EET)
  - Summer (DST): UTC+3 (EEST)
- Postal code: 35200
- Vehicle registration: ΜΙ

Zeli (Greek: Ζέλι, also Zeli Fthiotidas and Zeli Lokridas) is a mountain village in the municipality of Amfikleia-Elateia, part of the regional unit of Phthiotis, Greece. It has a population of 466 residents (2021 census), while the altitude is 450 to 550 meters. At a distance of four kilometers, is the village Kalapodi.

== Physical and economic review ==
The village lies on the eastern slope of Mount Varvas. According to previous measurements, Zeli has an area of 51,000 acres, from some of the 24,000 are arable and the remainder is woodland. Zeli is all green mountainous vegetation, including oaks, lavender, chamomile, etc. The village has a rich production in tobacco, wheat and figs. In each house can be seen winter gardens (cabbage, lettuce, onions, radishes, broccoli, carrots, etc.) or summer gardens (tomatoes, potatoes, cucumbers, peppers, eggplants, zucchini, etc.).

Moreover, in addition to agricultural occupations, the villagers are engaged in livestock, particularly sheep and poultry.

The climate of the village is very good, because of its proximity to both the Parnassus and the beaches of the Evian Gulf.

== History ==
Its name, according to some sources, comes from the Slavic word "Zeliinaakov", which means green valley and indicates that in the age of Byzantium was probably a Slavony. Testimonies indicate that it was first inhabited by the ancient times, when even the flourishing Opountion Lokrida. According to other sources, the name comes from the ancient Ozoles Locri. The area was named Ozelai =Ozeli=Zeli from where the Ozoles Locrians moved to the west. The area was all bushes and shrubs, life was difficult and the people suffered, so the residents with their flocks moved to Etoloakarnania and Phocis. Later, the Opountion Locrians lived in the settlements that were abandoned by Ozoles and the region continued to be called Ozeli and Zeli in their memory.

Between 1861 and 1912, when it became an independent community, Zeli belonged to the Municipality of Atalanti. The 1997 Kapodistrias reform placed it in the municipality of Elateia. With the new law "Kallikrates" established by the end of the municipal elections of 2010, Zeli was placed in the enlarged municipality of Amfikleia-Elateia, which is based in Kato Tithorea.

== Culture and sports ==
Zeli is one and a half hours away from Athens. It has bars, cafes and restaurants. The Cultural Association of Zeli, called "Osios Seraphim", is active in various cultural events in the region, such as conducting local dances in the village square and the organization of the carnival. It has a dance department with women and youth of the village, which has made appearances in Istanbul, Saint Petersburg and Italy.

The village also has local football team, Panzeliakos, which plays in amateur local groups.
