= 1894 Atalanti earthquakes =

Earthquakes in Greece

- Location within Greece
- UTC time
- 1894-04-20 15:52
- 1894-04-27 19:42
- Local date: 20 April 1894; 27 April 1894
- Local time: 16:52:30; 19:21:06
- Magnitude
- 6.7 M_{w}
- 6.9 M_{w}
- Depth: 10 km (6.2 mi)
- Epicenter: 38.65°N 23.08°E
- Areas affected: Greece, Locris
- Max. intensity: MMI X (Extreme)
- Tsunami: 3m maximum at Atalanti
- Casualties: 255

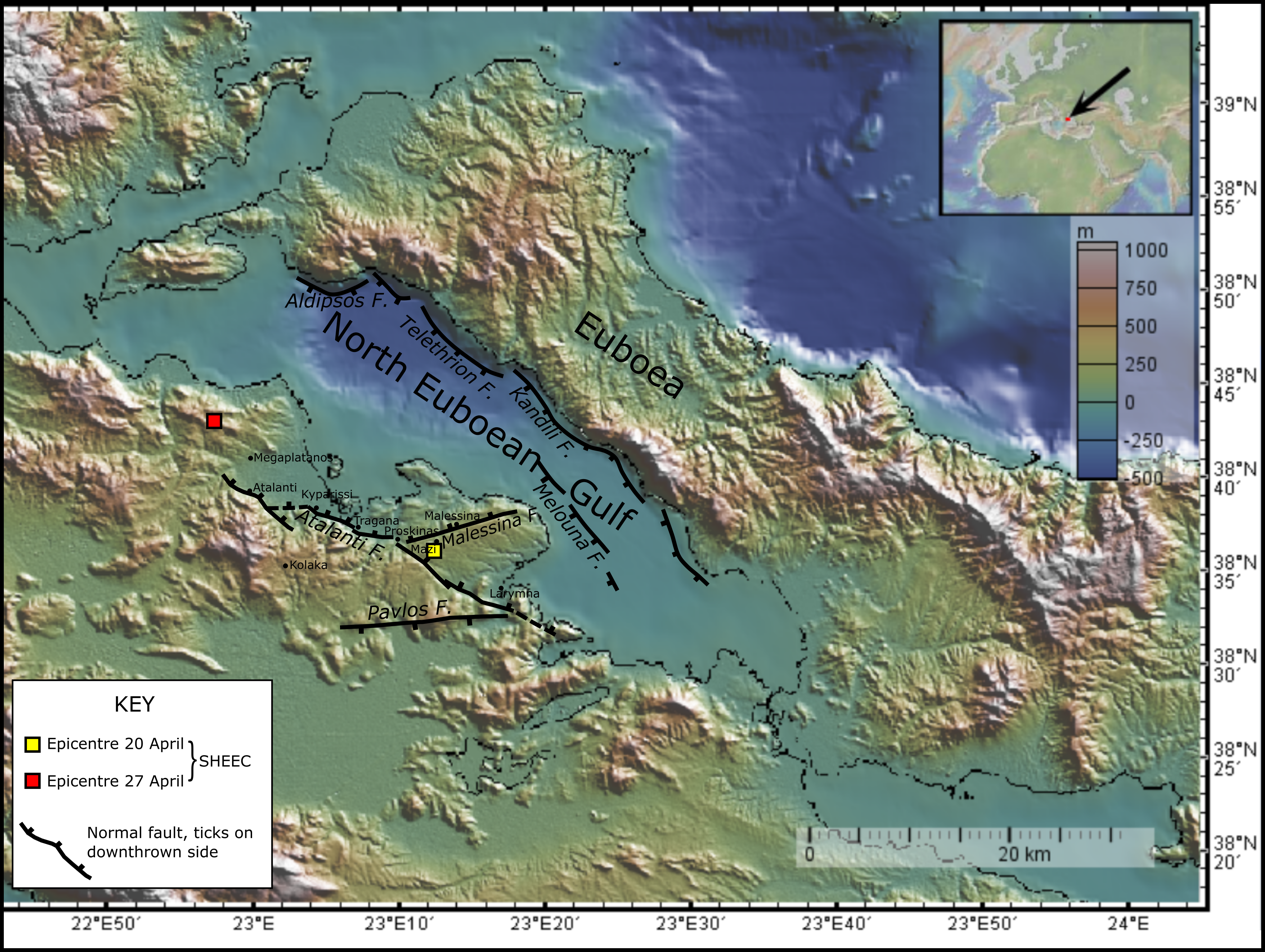
Topographic map of area around North Euboean Gulf, showing main mapped faults and epicentres of the 1894 earthquakes from the SHEEC catalogue

The first of the 1894 Atalanti earthquakes occurred on 20 April 1894 at 16:52 UTC, with a magnitude of 6.4 on the moment magnitude scale and a maximum perceived intensity of X on the Mercalli intensity scale. It was followed seven days later on 27 April at 19:42 UTC by the second, with a magnitude of 6.9, which also had a maximum intensity of X. These two earthquakes caused widespread damage in the Locris area, leading to a total of 255 deaths.

== Tectonic setting ==
The Locris region lies within the western part of the Aegean Sea plate, which ia being affected by active extensional tectonics, related to the continuing rollback of the subducting slab of the African plate. The extension is directed approximately north–south and has generated extensional faults with a WNW–ESE to NW–SE trend. The best known of these structures is the Gulf of Corinth basin. Near Atalanti, the main structure is the North Euboean Gulf, linking to the west with the Sperchios Basin. Active faults are known from both sides of the gulf. The larger faults lie on the northern side of the gulf, defining large parts of the coastline, such as the Aidiposoi fault zone, the Teletherion fault zone and the Kandili fault zone. All these faults are extensional in type and dip towards the south-southwest. On the south side of the gulf, the WNW–ESE trending Atalanti Fault and the WSW–ENE trending Malessina Fault are mapped, dipping to the north–northeast and north-northwest respectively. The area is also close to the western end of the North Anatolian strike-slip fault system and some SW–NE trending strike-slip faults have been identified.

Past seismic activity (before 1894) in the area includes the earthquake responsible for the 426 BC Malian Gulf tsunami, and another strong earthquake reported in 551/2 AD. Paleoseismological investigations along the Atalanti Fault have identified three historical earthquake that have ruptured to the surface. The most recent is the 1894 event, the older two are dated to between AD 770 and 1100 and to between 50 BC and AD 230. The oldest event has been linked to the AD 105 Opus earthquake. The implied repeat interval for earthquakes along the Atalanti Fault is in the range 660–1120 years.

== Earthquakes ==
The first of the Atalanti earthquakes, occurred on 20 April at 16:52 local (Athens) time. The area of greatest intensity of shaking caused by this earthquake is in the Malesina peninsula. Estimated intensities of X (Very destructive) on the European macroseismic scale (EMS) affected Malesina, Martino, Mazi and Proskinas, while in Kiparissi and Livanates intensities reached IX (Destructive), consistent with an epicentre near Mazi. The estimated magnitude for this event from the distribution of intensities is 6.77 ± 0.30 M_{w}. The second earthquake struck seven days later on 27 April at 19:21 local time. Many of the places affected by the second shock had already experienced high levels of shaking during the 20 April event, but the area of highest intensity lay close to Atalanti, which experienced shaking of X intensity, along with Arkitsa consistent with an epicentre near Goulemi. From the observed intensities, a magnitude of 6.91 ± 0.3 M_{w} has been estimated.

Surface ruptures were noted by contemporary observers immediately following the earthquakes. These surface features have been re-evaluated during more recent field surveys. Earlier descriptions mentioned up to 55 km of ruptures, although later surveys described shorter features. Despite degradation of fault scarps over the intervening years indications of surface offsets associated with the 1894 earthquake have been described over most of the mapped length of the Atalanti and Martinon segments of the Atalanti Fault. The possibility of ruptures along the Malesina Fault has also been examined, although here the evidence is more equivocal.

== Impact ==
These seismic events profoundly affected the region's inhabitants, with many homes destroyed and significant loss of life and injuries reported. Historical reports describe widespread devastation, and the Hellenic Red Cross intervened quickly, spending about 7,600 drachmas on temporary huts and bread for the homeless across Locris and neighbouring provinces. These relief measures underline the scale of the disaster and the need for rapid reconstruction.

In addition to surface damage, the quakes led to significant environmental impacts, including landslides, sand-and-water ejections and possible spring disturbances. Soil liquefaction was seen in places up to 40 km from the epicentral area. This caused damage near Kopais and Topolia and led to the quay at Kato Pelli foundering.

== Tsunami ==
The tsunami triggered by the second of the two earthquakes was observed to reach a height of 3 m at Atalanti. It continued northwards at least as far as Agios Konstantinos, where a 50 m withdrawal was noted, before the arrival of the wave.

== Historical significance ==
Prior to the 1894 earthquakes, the Atalanti area had been seismically quiet for over 1300 years, with no significant earthquakes recorded since at least 551 AD. This long period of seismic quiescence made the 1894 events particularly noteworthy to seismologists studying patterns of earthquake occurrence in historically active regions.

== Geological effects ==
The mainshock caused extensive surface faulting from Martino to Atalanti, covering about 25 km. Field reports documented normal faulting patterns, with researchers noting a seismic wave that flooded the Atalanti Gulf coastline. Another recorded effect was the increase in water levels at the hot springs in Loutra Aidhipsou.

== Modern implications ==
A century after these events, researchers from the University of Athens used the European Macroseismic Scale (EMS92) to re-evaluate these historical earthquakes. Their findings suggest that if similar earthquakes occurred today, Athens would experience ground accelerations at least 20% higher than in 1894. This increased vulnerability stems from the city's expansion onto unfavourable soil conditions and the proliferation of high-rise buildings over the past century, highlighting ongoing seismic risks to the Greek capital.

== See also ==
- List of earthquakes in Greece
- List of historical earthquakes
