= Hyampolis =

City in ancient Phocis, Greece

- Ὑάμπολις (Greek)
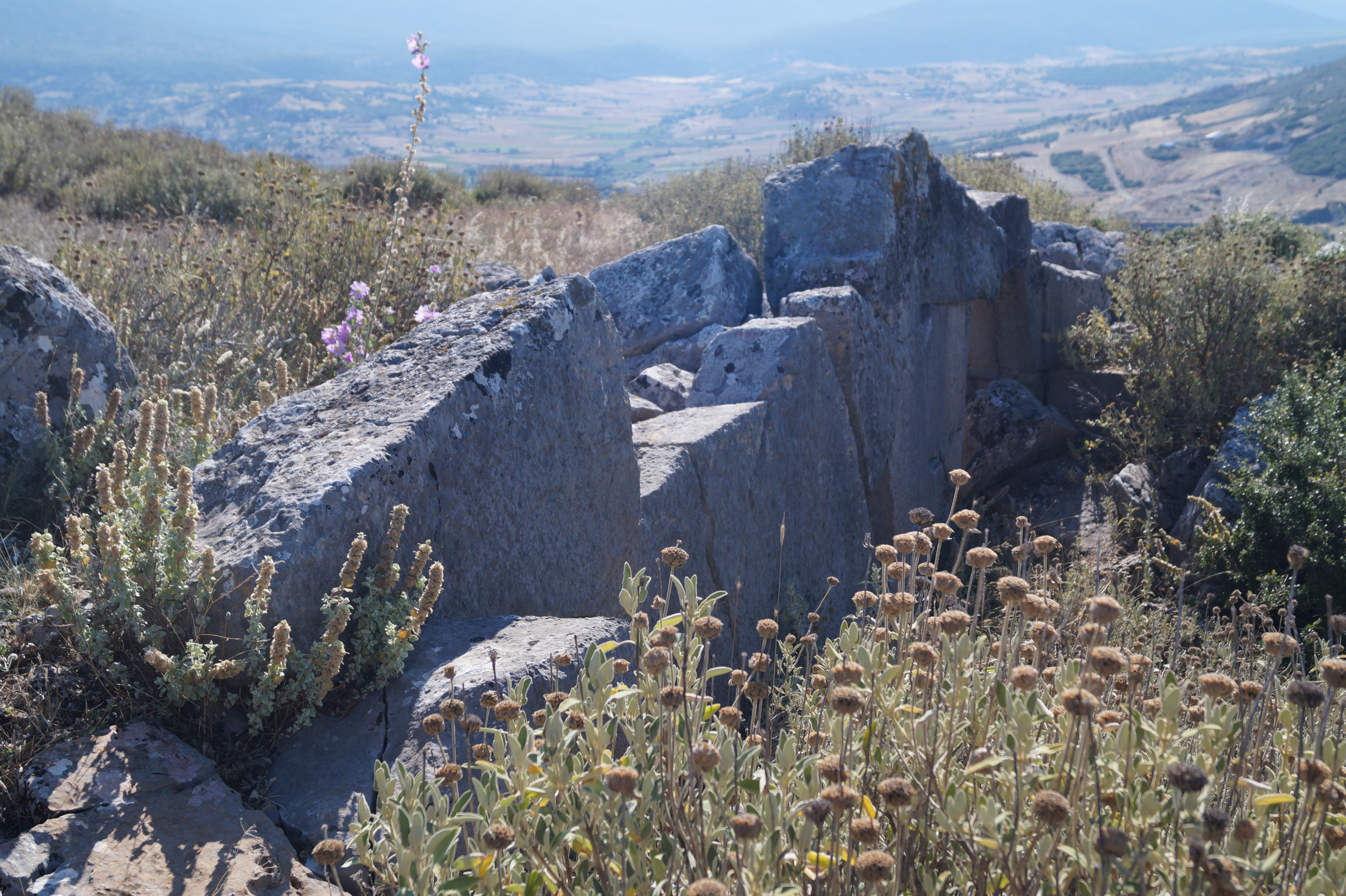
- Gate in circuit wall of fortified city on Kastro Hill near Exarchos. The site is currently considered ancient Hyampolis.

- Location within Greece
- 38°34′49″N 22°54′57″E
- Type: polis
- Location: Exarchos
- Region: Lokroi
- Part of: Ancient Phocis

Hyampolis (Ὑάμπολις Iabolis) was a city in ancient Phocis, Greece. A native of this city was called a Hyampolites. Some ancient authors record that the city was also called simply Hya.

== Mythology and situation ==
In the ancient tradition, the city was said to have been founded by the Hyantes after their expulsion from Boeotia by the Cadmeians. Yet a scholiast on Euripides mentions Hyamus, son of Lycorus, as the eponymous founder of Hyampolis. The city is mentioned in Homer's Iliad (Catalogue of Ships).

Hyampolis lay in a valley in east Phocis, about eight kilometers from Abae, north-northwest of Orchomenus, situated on the road leading from Orchomenus to Opus, As it stood at the entrance of a valley which formed a convenient passage from Locris into Phocis and Boeotia, the city was of strategic importance and is often mentioned in works on ancient history.

== History ==
During the Greco-Persian Wars, it was at the entrance of this pass that the Phocians gained a victory over the Thessalians. Later in the same wars, in 480 BCE the city was destroyed, along with the other Phocian towns, by the army of Xerxes. In 395 BCE, the Boeotians besieged the city, but failed to sack it. In 371 BCE, Jason, tyrant of Pherae, destroyed the unprotected lower town (sometimes identified with the village Cleonae) as he was returning from Boeotia after the Battle of Leuctra. In 347 BCE a battle was fought near Hyampolis between the Boeotians and Phocians. In the year 346 BCE the city was attacked once more, this time by Philip II of Macedon, who destroyed the city; Pausanias states that the ruins of the ancient agora, a small council chamber building, and theatre were still remaining in his time (2nd century), having survived destruction by Philip; it must have been chiefly the fortifications which were destroyed by Philip. After reconstruction, the city was once again captured in 198 BCE by Titus Quinctius Flamininus and fell under Roman rule. Hadrian had a stoa constructed in the city; the Emperor Septimius Severus is mentioned in a local inscription. Pausanias notes that a single well in the whole city was the only freshwater source for the citizens unless they were able to collect rainwater. Pliny the Elder and Ptolemy erroneously describe Hyampolis as a city of Boeotia. Pausanias wrote that once a plague hit the city, and under the guidance of Oracle of Delphi, the people sacrificed a he-goat to the sun god, Helios, to relieve them from the plague.

== Archaeology ==
The site of Hyampolis is near the modern town of Exarkhos (formerly Bogdanou or Vogdháni), and is a well-developed archaeological site.

Excavations held in the early 20th century failed to uncover buildings described by Pausanias. However, the well described by him was claimed to have been recognized in a big cistern of Hellenistic times uncovered at the site. Until today only a wall from the 4th century BCE and some other substantial remains survive. William Martin Leake in the 19th century described the archaeological site as follows:

The entire circuit of the fortifications is traceable, but they are most complete on the western side. The masonry is of the third order, nearly approaching to the most regular kind. The circumference is about three-quarters of a mile. The direct distance to this ruin from the summit of Abae is not more than a mile and a half in a north-west direction. Below Vogdháni, on the side of a steep bank which falls to the valley of Khúbavo, a fountain issuing from the rock is discharged through two spouts into a stone reservoir of ancient construction, which stands probably in its original place.

Five kilometers north of Hyampolis, near Kalapodi, remains of a temple possibly belonging to a sanctuary of Artemis Elaphebolos or of Apollo Abaeus were discovered. Artemis Elaphebolos was the chief deity of the area, and the festival Elaphebolia was celebrated in her honor. On the basis of inscriptions and votive offerings, the oldest building phase of the sanctuary can be dated back to the Geometric period. In c. 575/550 BCE, the temple was rebuilt in the classical style. In 426 BCE, it was damaged by an earthquake. The damage was repaired by the end of the century.

The city was populated and the sanctuary functioned by the times of the Roman Empire. In the vicinity of the sanctuary was found a burial site from the Byzantine period.

== Notable people ==
- Philo (c. 1st century BC), ancient Greek physician

== Sources ==
- Ernst Meyer: Hyampolis. In: Der Kleine Pauly (KlP). Band 2, Stuttgart 1967, Sp. 1255–1256.
- R. C. S. Felsch: Kalapodi. Bericht über die Grabungen im Heiligtum der Artemis Elaphebolos und des Apollon von Hyampolis. In: Archäologischer Anzeiger 1987, S. 1–26.
- R. C. S. Felsch: Kalapodi. Ergebnisse der Ausgrabungen im Heiligtum der Artemis und des Apollon von Hyampolis in der antiken Phokis I. Mainz 1996.
- Realencyclopädie der Classischen Altertumswissenschaft, Band IX, Halbband 17, Hyaia-Imperator (1914), ss. 17 - 22
