= Battle of Martino =

1829 battle of the Greek War of Independence

- Part of the Greek War of Independence
Date	29 January 1829
Location	Martino, Phthiotis, Central Greece, Greece
Result	Greek victory

Belligerents
Greek revolutionaries	Ottoman Empire

Commanders and leaders
Vasos Mavrovouniotis	Mahmut Pasha

Strength
200 irregulars	Unknown

Casualties and losses
3 dead	250 dead, more than 250 wounded

The Battle of Martino was one of the last military episodes of the Greek War of Independence.

== The history of the battle ==
Mavrovouniotis, learning that Mahmut was preparing an attack, fortified himself and sent 200 men to spy on the enemy. He ordered the first five-hundred-year-old Triantafyllos Tsura to occupy the houses around the village, and the second Ioannis Klimakas the center, and he with 100 horsemen surveyed the fortifications. On the morning of January 29, 1829, Mahmut Pasha appeared leading his cavalry.

The infantry followed. When they reached the fortifications, they rushed and advanced to the middle houses of the village. A fierce battle ensued. The enemies fought bravely, and after about two hours they retreated due to the fire of the Greeks who were firing from their forts.

The Greeks, seeing the enemy shaken, rushed and put them to flight, killing about 250 and wounding more. However, they stopped the pursuit, because suddenly a storm broke out and an icy wind arose. Only three of the Greeks were wounded. They captured a lot of loot, pack animals, money, and three flags.

All the officers excelled in the battle, and Vassos, who was seen everywhere in the battle, inspiring the fighters and charging relentlessly against the enemies, was defeated and fled on February 10, 1829 to Lamia. Omer Pasha, upon learning of Mahmud's defeat, also fled, leaving a guard in Thebes.
