= Olmones =

Coordinates: 38°32′31″N 23°05′52″E

Olmones (Ancient Greek: Ὄλμῶνες) was a village in ancient Boeotia, situated 12 stadia to the left of Copae, and 7 stadia from Hyettus. It derived its name from Olmus, the son of Sisyphus, but contained nothing worthy of notice in the time of Pausanias (2nd century).

Its site is located north of modern Pavlon/Pavlos in the municipal unit of Orchomenos.
