= Chlomo =

Mountain in southeastern Phthiotis, Greece

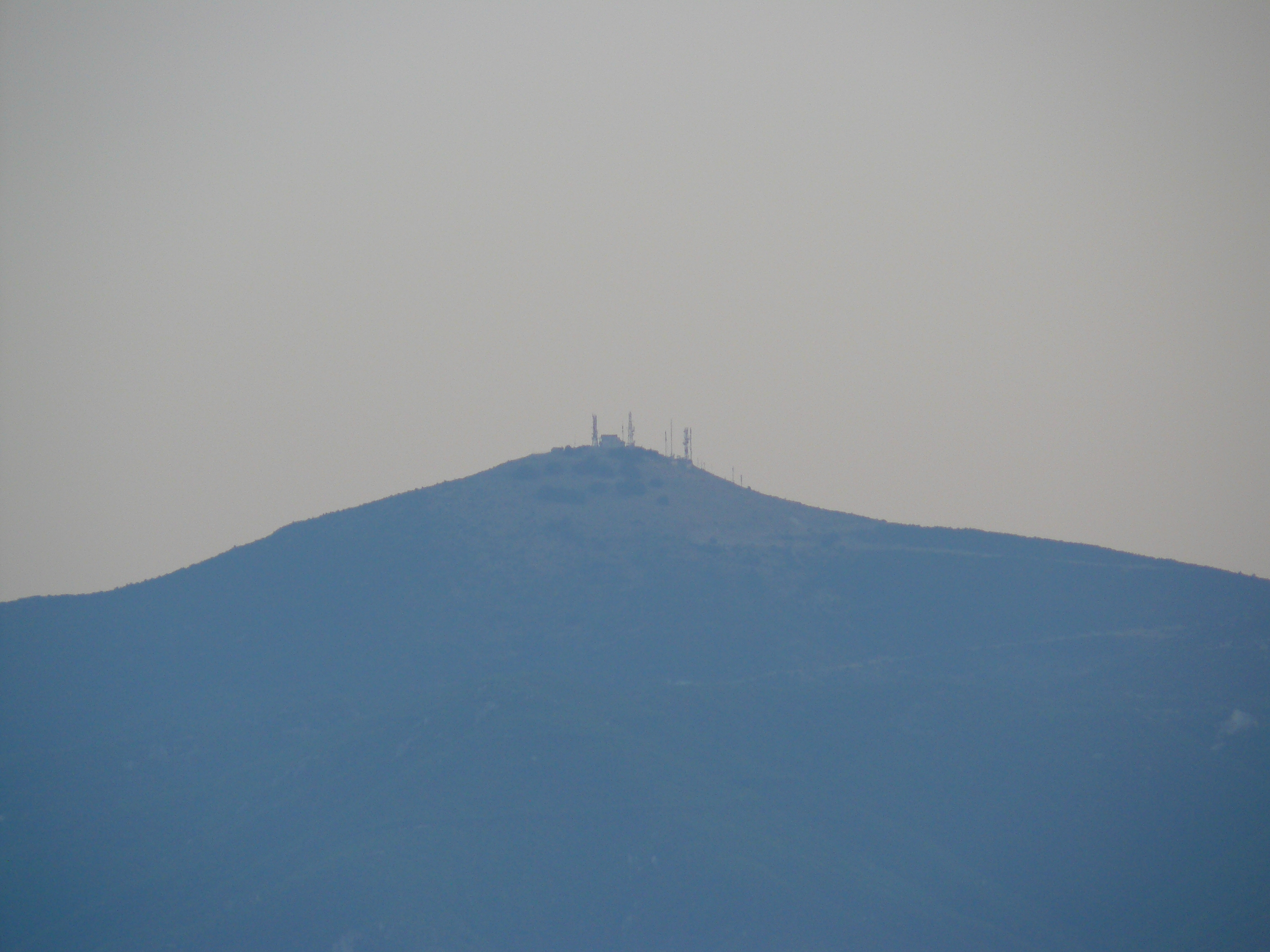

Highest point
- Elevation: 1,081 m (3,547 ft)
- Coordinates: 38°35′58″N 23°00′09″E

Geography
- Location within Greece
- Location: Phthiotis, Greece

Chlomo (Greek: Χλωμό, Chlomó) is a mountain in southeastern Phthiotis, Greece with an elevation of 1,081 m. Nearby mountains are Kallidromo to the northwest and Ptoo to the southeast. The plain of former Lake Copais lies to the south. Settlements situated near the mountain include Atalanti to the north, Kyrtoni to the southeast and Exarchos to the west.
