= Opountioi =

Opountioi Οπούντιοι
- Municipal unit
- Location within the regional unit

- Location within Greece
- Coordinates: 38°34′N 23°13′E
- Country: Greece
- Administrative region: Central Greece
- Regional unit: Phthiotis
- Municipality: Lokroi

Area
  - Municipal unit: 129.5 km^{2} (50.0 sq mi)

Population (2021)
  - Municipal unit: 2,923
  - Municipal unit density: 22.57/km^{2} (58.46/sq mi)
- Time zone: UTC+2 (EET)
  - Summer (DST): UTC+3 (EEST)
- Vehicle registration: ΜΙ

Opountioi (Greek: Οπούντιοι) is a former municipality in Phthiotis, Greece with an area 129.534 km^{2} and a population of 2,923 inhabitants (2021 census). It was established in 1997 from the former communities Larymna and Martino. The name refers to the ancient Greek city Opus and its inhabitants (Opountean Locrians). Since the 2011 local government reform, it is a part of the municipality Lokroi, of which it is a municipal unit. The seat of the municipality was Martino (pop. 1,722 in 2021).
