= Exarchos, Phthiotis =

Exarchos Έξαρχος
- Community
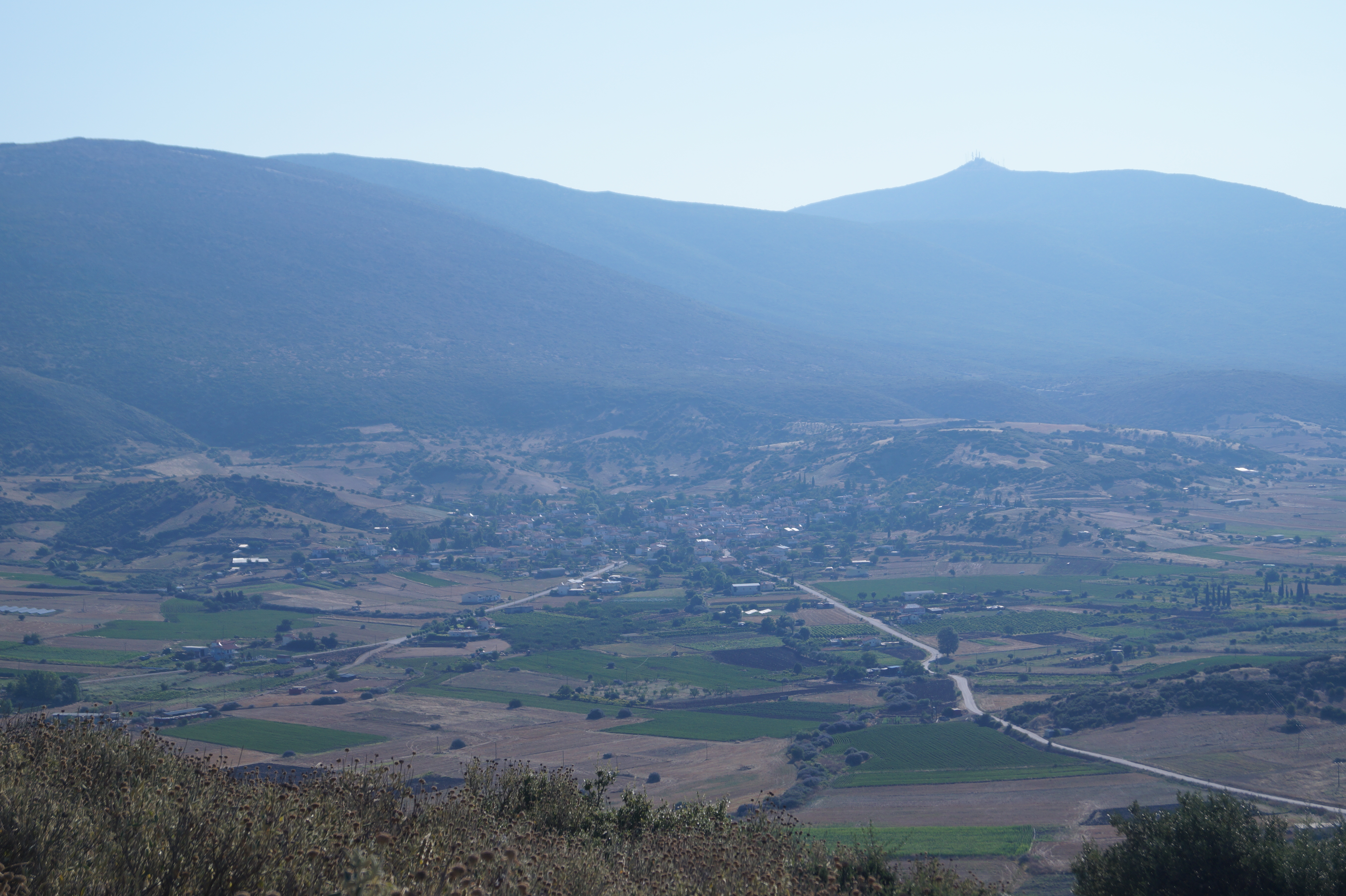
- Exarchos, Phthiotis

- Location within Greece
- Coordinates: 38°35′N 22°56′E
- Country: Greece
- Administrative region: Central Greece
- Regional unit: Phthiotis
- Municipality: Lokroi
- Municipal unit: Atalanti
- Elevation: 300 m (980 ft)

Population (2021)
  - Community: 524
- Time zone: UTC+2 (EET)
  - Summer (DST): UTC+3 (EEST)
- Postal code: 352 00
- Area code: 22330
- Vehicle registration: ΜΙ

Exarchos is a village in Phthiotis prefecture, central Greece. It is located in the southern part of Phthiotis, in Locris, 18 km west of Atalanti. The village is located on the slope of Mount Chlomo at a height of about 300 meters. Its population is 524 inhabitants according to 2021 census. Exarchos belongs to Lokroi municipality.

Most of the inhabitants of Exarchos are engaged in agriculture. The wider area of the village consists of agricultural lands and the majority of crops include cotton and cereals.

== History ==
Near Exarchos, there are the ancient Phocian cities (Polis) Abae and Hyampolis. The cities flourished during Hellenistic and Roman times. Ruins of these cities are located in the north and west of Exarchos. The date of depopulation of two cities isn't known. Likely, it happened the late Roman period or the early Byzantine. The today village Exarchos was built after the dereliction of the ancient cities. The name possibly derived from someone Exarch, a bishop of the eastern churches. However, inhabitants of the village suggest that the name comes from a time when the present site of the village was chosen as a place to amalgamate 6 villages in the area. Prior to its present name, it was called "Bogdanou" or "Vogdháni". Likely it was for a while an episcopal see. Near the village there are several churches from 13th century and later that show the continuous habitation of the area until now. Today, Exarchos is a small agricultural village, part of the Lokroi municipality.

== Archeological Findings ==
Excavations carried out in the area of Exarchos confirm the fact that the ancient city of Ava was located there.

The most important archaeological finds come from tombs in this area and are kept in the Archaeological Museum of Atalanta.

Equally important is the finding of a tombstone from Roman times, which represents an androgynous in frontal position and a balanced arrangement with two children. This tombstone is now housed in the museum of Thebes .

The acropolis of Abes, according to the excavations, is located in Smixi, southwest of Exarchos. In addition, relics of Middle Helladic buildings were found there, as well as a number of stone tools, clay flywheels, a copper plate and a beetle-shaped vessel made of ash clay.

== Local customs and events ==
Interesting carnival events exist on Halloween with folk events based on current topics. During the summer months, the Exarchos cultural association "Yampolis" mainly organizes theatrical performances as well as dance nights with live music and dance clubs from all over Greece. The village festival takes place on May 10.

In the area of Exarchos there are 9 churches and chapels: Saint Nikolaos (famous church with exceptional frescoes of the 12th century outside the settlement that operates on the Sunday of Thomas), Saint George in the central square of the village, Saint Ioannis north of the settlement, Panagia north of the central square, Panagia whose memory is celebrated on the Friday after Easter (Zoodochou Pigis), Metamorphosis tou Sotiros, Ag. Brigadiers, Agios Georgios, Saints Taxiarches, and Agios Athanasios.

=== Historical population ===
Year	Settlement
1991	826
2001	925
2011	699
2021	524

== Places of interest ==
- Abae, archaeological site near Exarchos.
- Hyampolis, archaeological site near Exarchos.
- Church of Agios Nikolaos, an old church of 13th century.
