= Abae =

Ancient town in the northeastern corner of ancient Phocis, in Greece

- Ἄβαι (Ancient Greek)
- Kalapodi
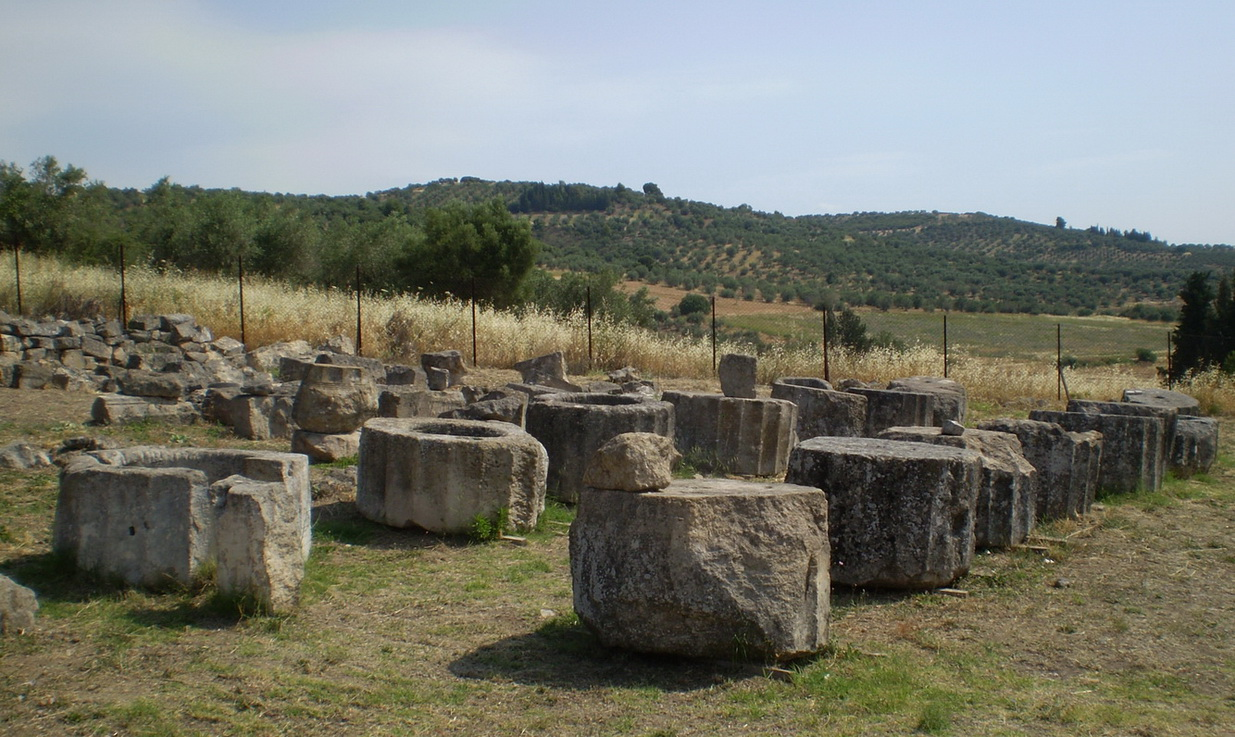
- The archaeological site

- Location within Greece
- 38°38′13.46″N 22°53′44.81″E
- Location: Ancient Phocis

Abae (Ancient Greek: Ἄβαι, Abai) (Note: The ancient history of the site is derived from references in ancient works. There is no continuous history. These references are called fragments. The Topos Text Project has undertaken to collect these fragments, combined with archaeological information, on various topics of ancient history. It has found at least 19 on Abae: "Apollo of Abae (phthiotis) 19 Kalapodi". Topos Text. For example, one from Stephanus of Byzantium. Ethnica. Vol. s.v. Abae. states that Abae is "a city of the Phokians, where there is a sanctuary of Apollo. This was the oracle before the one in Delphi." The s.v. stands for sub verso, "under the heading.") was an ancient town in the northeastern corner of ancient Phocis, in Greece, near the frontiers of the Opuntian Locrians, said to have been built by the Argive Abas, son of Lynceus and Hypermnestra, and grandson of Danaus. This bit of legend suggests an origin or at least an existence in the Bronze Age, and sites protohistory supports a continued existence in Iron-Age antiquity. It was famous for its oracle of Apollo Abaeus, one of those consulted by Croesus, king of Lydia, and Mardonius, among others. The site of the oracle was rediscovered at Kalapodi and excavated in modern times. The results confirm an archaeological existence dating from the Bronze Age, as is suggested by the lore, and continuous occupation from the Early Bronze Age to the Roman Period.

== History ==
Before the Persian invasion, the temple was richly adorned with treasuries and votive offerings. It was twice destroyed by fire; the first time by the Persians in the invasion of Xerxes in their march through Phocis (480 BCE), and a second time by the Boeotians in the Sacred or Phocian War in 346 BCE. It was rebuilt by Hadrian. Hadrian caused a smaller temple to be built near the ruins of the former one. In the new temple there were three ancient statues in brass of Apollo, Leto, and Artemis, which had been dedicated by the Abaei, and had perhaps been saved from the former temple. The ancient agora and the ancient theatre still existed in the town in the time of Pausanias. According to the statement of Aristotle, as preserved by Strabo, Thracians from the Phocian town of Abae immigrated to Euboea, and gave to the inhabitants the name of Abantes.

== Oracle ==
Despite destruction of the town, the oracle was still consulted, e.g. by the Thebans before the Battle of Leuctra in 371 BCE. The temple, along with the village of the same name, may have escaped destruction during the Third Sacred War (355–346 BCE), due to the respect given to the inhabitants; however, it was in a very dilapidated state when seen by Pausanias in the 2nd century CE, though some restoration, as well as the building of a new temple, was undertaken by Emperor Hadrian.

The sanctity of the shrine ensured certain privileges to the people of Abae, and these were confirmed by the Romans. The Persians did not reflect this opinion and would destroy all the temples that they overcame, Abae included. The Greeks pledged not to rebuild them as a memorial of the ravages of the Persians.

Among the most exciting recent archaeological discoveries in Greece is the recognition that the sanctuary site near the modern village of Kalapodi is not only the site of the oracle of Apollon at Abae, but that it was in constant use for cult practices from early Mycenaean times to the Roman period. It is thus the first site where the archaeology confirms the continuity of Mycenaean and Classical Greek religion, which has been inferred from the presence of the names of Classical Greek divinities on Linear B texts from Pylos and Knossos. (Note: See reports of the excavations of the German Archaeological Institute in Archaeological Reports for 2008/9 43-45, Archaeological Reports for 2007/8 47-49, Archaeological Reports for 2006/7 41-43, Archaeological Reports for 2005/6 68-69, Archaeological Reports for 2004/5 55-56.)

The fortified site described below, originally identified as Abae by Colonel William Leake in the 19th century, is much more likely to be that of the Sanctuary of Artemis at Hyampolis:

"The polygonal walls of the acropolis may still be seen in a fair state of preservation on a circular hill standing about 500 ft. [150 m] above the little plain of Exarcho; one gateway remains, and there are also traces of town walls below. The temple site was on a low spur of the hill, below the town. An early terrace wall supports a precinct in which are a stoa and some remains of temples; these were excavated by the British School at Athens in 1894, but very little was found."

The oracle was mentioned in Oedipus Rex.

== Reference bibliography ==
- Avery, Catherine A., ed. (1962). "Abae". The New Century Classical Handbook. New York, NY: Appleton-Century-Crofts, Inc. LCCN 62-10069.
- Bell, Robert E. (1989). Place-Names in Classical Mythology. Santa Barbara, CA: ABC-CLIO. ISBN 978-0874365078.
- Bilco, J. (1882). "Lettre du roi Philippe aux habitants d'Abae". Bulletin de Correspondance Hellénique. 6: 171–175. doi:10.3406/bch.1882.4191.
- Henderson, Jeffrey, ed. (2000) [1926]. Pausanian Description of Greece. Vol. II: Books III-V. Translated by W. H. S. Jones; H. A. Ormerod. Cambridge, UK: Harvard University Press. ISBN 0-674-99207-5.
- Henderson, Jeffrey, ed. (2000a) [1935]. Pausanian Description of Greece. Vol. IV: Books VIII §22 — X. Translated by W. H. S. Jones; H. A. Ormerod. Cambridge, UK: Harvard University Press. ISBN 0-674-99328-4.
- Herodotus (1920). Herodotus. Vol. I: Books I and II. Translated by Godley, A. D. London, UK: William Heinemann. ISBN 9780674991316.
- Herodotus (2003) [1939]. Powell, J. Enoch (ed.). Herodotus, Book VIII (in Ancient Greek). London, UK: Duckworth Publishers. ISBN 978-0862920043.
- Hesychius; Schmidt, Mauricius (1867). "Ἄβαι". Hesychii Alexandrini lexicon (in Ancient Greek) (2nd ed.). Sumptibus Hermanni Dufftii (Libraria Maukiana).
- Hoiberg, Dale H., ed. (2010). "Abae". Encyclopædia Britannica. Vol. 1: A-ak Bayes (15th ed.). Chicago, Illinois: Encyclopædia Britannica, Inc. ISBN 978-0-85229-961-6. LCCN 2002113989.
- Pausanias (1898). Pausanias's Description of Greece. Vol. V. Translated by Frazer, J. G. London, UK: Macmillan and Company, Limited.
- Schmitz, Leonhard (2013) [1867]. "Abaeus". In Smith, William (ed.). Dictionary of Greek and Roman Biography and Mythology. Cambridge Library Collection - Classics. Vol. 1: Abaeus - Dysponteus. Cambridge, UK: Cambridge University Press. ISBN 978-1108060820. Archived from the original on 2008-07-14.
- Smith, William (2011) [1850]. "Abæ". A new classical dictionary of biography, mythology, and geography, partly based on the "Dictionary of Greek and Roman biography and mythology". Nabu Press. ISBN 978-1172756001.
