= Elateia =

Elateia Ελάτεια
- Municipal unit
- Location within the regional unit

- Location within Greece
- Coordinates: 38°38′N 22°46′E
- Country: Greece
- Administrative region: Central Greece
- Regional unit: Phthiotis
- Municipality: Amfikleia-Elateia

Area
  - Municipal unit: 154.4 km^{2} (59.6 sq mi)

Population (2021)
  - Municipal unit: 2,804
  - Municipal unit density: 18.16/km^{2} (47.04/sq mi)
  - Community: 2,002
- Time zone: UTC+2 (EET)
  - Summer (DST): UTC+3 (EEST)
- Vehicle registration: ΜΙ

Elateia (Greek: Ελάτεια; Ancient Greek: Ἐλάτεια) was an ancient Greek city of Phthiotis, and the most important place in that region after Delphi. It is also a modern-day town that is a former municipality in the southeastern part of Phthiotis. Since the 2011 local government reform, it is a municipal unit of the municipality Amfikleia-Elateia. Its population is 2,804 inhabitants (2021 census) and its land area is 154.361 km^{2}. The municipal seat was the town of Eláteia (pop. 2,002); other communities are Zeli (466), Panagítsa (148), Lefkochóri (99) and Sfáka (89).

== History ==
Ancient Elateia was situated about the middle of the great fertile basin that extends nearly 20 miles, from the narrows of the Cephissus River below Amphicleia, to the entrance into Boeotia. Hence it was admirably placed for commanding the passes into southern Greece from Mount Oeta, and became a post of great military importance.

Pausanias describes it as situated over against Amphicleia, at the distance of 180 stadia from the latter town, on a gently rising slope in the plain of the Cephissus. Elateia is not mentioned by Homer. Its inhabitants claimed they were Arcadians, deriving their name from Elatus, the son of Arcas. It was burnt, along with the other Phocian towns, by the Persian army of Xerxes during the Second Persian invasion of Greece in 480 BC.

When Philip II of Macedon entered Phocis in 339 BC, with the professed object of conducting war against Amphissa, he seized Elateia and began to restore its fortifications. The alarm this caused at Athens shows that they regarded Phocis as a key of southern Greece. The subsequent history of Elateia is given in some detail by Pausanias. It successfully resisted Cassander in 301 BC, but it was taken by the king of Macedon Philip V, the son of Demetrius II Aetolicus. It remained faithful to Philip V when the Romans invaded Greece, and was taken by assault by the Romans in 198 BC. At a later time, the Romans declared the town free, because the inhabitants had repulsed an 86 BC attack by Taxiles, the general of Mithridates VI.

Among noteworthy sites in Elateia, Pausanias mentions the agora, a temple of Asclepius that contained a beardless statue of the god, a theater, and an ancient brazen statue of Athena. He also mentions a temple of Athena Cranaea, situated 20 stadia from Elateia: the road to it was a very gentle ascent, but the temple stood upon a steep hill of small size.

The ancient city has been repeatedly sacked and destroyed in its history, and also subject to several earthquakes. For these reasons the one modern excavation of the classical site has not been much successful; the one exception was the Temple of Athena Cranaea. What has been attested is continuous occupation of the valley, that goes back to as far as 6000 BC.

== See also ==
- List of ancient Greek cities
