= Cyrtones =

Coordinates: 38°35′08″N 23°02′42″E

Cyrtones or Kyrtones (Ancient Greek: Κύρτωνες), anciently called Cyrtone or Kyrtone (Κυρτώνη), was a city of Boeotia, east of the Lake Copais, and 20 stadia from Hyettus, situated upon a lofty mountain, after crossing which the traveller arrived at Corsia. Cyrtones contained a grove and temple of Apollo, in which were statues of Apollo and Artemis, and a fountain of cold water, at the source of which was a chapel of the nymphs.

The site of Cyrtones is tentatively located at Kastron Kolakas/Karaouli, near the modern village of Kyrtoni, which was renamed from Kolaka to reflect association with the ancient town. The remains of a walled enclosure, and of a building, possibly a temple, have been found. This ancient fortification has a square tower made out of 1.5 m thick stones. From the ancient fountain now known as Kamini flows brackish, ice cold water with healing properties (for dysentery).
