= Martino, Phthiotis =

Martino Μαρτίνο
- Community
- Location within Greece
- Coordinates: 38°34′N 23°13′E
- Country: Greece
- Administrative region: Central Greece
- Regional unit: Phthiotis
- Municipality: Lokroi
- Municipal unit: Opountioi

Population (2021)
  - Community: 1,722
- Time zone: UTC+2 (EET)
  - Summer (DST): UTC+3 (EEST)

Martino (Greek: Μαρτίνο) is an Arvanitic settlement in the regional unit of Phthiotis in Central Greece, and belongs to the municipality of Lokroi. Martino is located 120 km north from Athens, at an altitude of 300m. Neighbouring settlements are Malesina and Larymna.

== History ==
=== 3rd century BC ===
In the area of Martino, the 3rd century BC, developed a city with the name "Voumelitea". The city flourished until the Byzantine period.

=== The establishment of Martino in 1383 AD ===
Martino founded around 1383 AD, as a settlement to its present location, and owes its name to Martin Mouzaki, leader of an Arvanite faction from the Muzaka family of Southern Albania, whose relatives also founded Santa Cristina Gela in Sicily.

=== Ottoman rule ===
In 1466 13 households were in the Martino. In 1506 they increased to 46 and in 1521 they reached 77. In 1688 the households of Martino increased to 100, whereas before the Greek Revolution, in 1810, reached 300, all belong to Christian families.

The traveler Argyris Philippides, visited Locrida in 1815, wrote about Martino: Martino has three hundred Christian houses. Here the common language is Arvanitika. They speak of course and our language (Greek).

=== From the Greek revolution of 1821 until the Liberation ===
During the Greek Revolution of 1821, seven combatants from Martino referd: Dimos Angelis, Dimos Vergos, John Kollias, Dimos Kouros, Loukas Martinoaios, Giannakis Mitzou and Panos Theodoris.

One of the major battles during the Greek revolution in the region of Locrida was that of Martino, held on January 29, 1829. Vasos Mavrovouniotis with 6th body of 1000 men decimated the Turkish army.

The most important result of the victorious battle of the Greeks was that they prevented the Turkish plans for reclaiming the mainland Greece, as well as the program was able to Kapodistrias to negotiate under different and more favorable terms the borders of the newly established, independent Greek state.

=== Martino from the establishment of the modern Greek state until today ===
In 1840 Martino became the seat of the municipality Larymna. The seat moved to Proskynas in 1857, to return to Martino in 1872. The municipality enclosed the villages: Martino, Pavlos, Traganas, Malesina, Pyrgos, Loutsi, Larymna, Tsouka, Proskynas and Mazi.

In 1882 starts the "Greek School" or "Greek Scholarcheion" in Martino. In the 1894 Atalanti earthquakes that shooked Locrida, caused Martino significant damage. In a total of 1434, 39 people were killed and 23 others injured, while 300 houses collapsed.

Martino became an independent community in 1912, having separated from the former municipality of Larymna. The new community included Martino and the village Tsouka (renamed to Metalleio Tsoukas in 1920). In 1929 the football club "Opountios Martinou" was established.

Another key feature here is the presence of several cultural groups. In 1976 founded the Cultural Association of Martino, "MO.SY.M" which seeks to support every kind of act of cultural interest.

At the 1997 Kapodistrias reform, Martino became the seat of the new municipality of Opountioi. With the new administrative reform of the Greek state (Kallikratis plan), Martino joined the enlarged municipality of Locroi.

=== Population ===
| Year | Population |
|---|---|
| 1844 | 2,050 |
| 1907 | 1,586 |
| 1920 | 1,605 |
| 1952 | 2,068 |
| 2001 | 3,005 |
| 2011 | 1,923 |
| 2021 | 1,722 |

== Attractions - Tourism - Cultural events ==
The old part of the village was declared a protected monument.

There is also the Byzantine church of Agios Georgios with Byzantine frescoes and icons.

Other attractions of the village are the entrance of the temple of Pan and the ancient fountains "Tsorokos" and "Monachou".

Each November the 8th, the village celebrates the archangels Michael and Gabriel with various events in the central church.

== Sources ==
1. Avraam Dimitrios P. 2001. "Locrida - Perivoagria-Epiknymidia." Lamia 2001. (In Greek)
2. Dakoronia F., Kotoulas D., et al. - "Locris - History & Culture." Publisher: Hatzimichali Estate. (In Greek)
3. Journal, " Ajax the Locrian 'seventh year, October 27-November–December 2011. - Batsos Nikos A. "The Battle of Martino - January 29, 1829 and Martinoaion participation in the struggle for Freedom." page 3, 8. (In Greek)
4. Karastathis Kostas B. 1999. "Malesina - History - Monuments - Archaeological Sites." Athens. Publication of the Group for the rescue of the Byzantine church of Agios Georgios in Malesina. (In Greek)
5. "Lokrika Chronicles". 1997. Athens: Annual Publication of Historical and Folklore Society Research of Atalanti (E.I.L.E.A.). Vol. 3. (In Greek)
6. "Lokrika Chronicles". 1998. Athens: Annual Publication of Historical and Folklore Society Research Atalanti (E.I.L.E.A.). Vol. 4.(In Greek)
7. Papanagiotou. D. Triantafyllou. - "1821 in Lokrida - The Battle of Martino and its importance." Publ. Fthiotika Grammata. Athens 1979. (In Greek)
8. Magazine "Apoplous" Issue 6. 2002. Version: Musical and Cultural Association "Atalanti Choir." page 6. (In Greek)
9. Protopapas Zissis. 1952. "Locrida". Athens 1952. (In Greek)
10. Christophorou K. Manthos 1991. - "The Opountion Locrida and Atalanti - Memories and testimonies." 1st Part. Athens: Society for Historical and Folklore Research Atalanti (E.I.L.E.A.). (In Greek)
11. Christophorou K. Manthos 1993. "The Opountion Locrida and Atalanti - Memories and testimonies." Part second. Athens: Society for Historical and Folklore Research Atalanti (E.I.L.E.A.). (In Greek)
12. Christophorou K. Manthos 1995. "The Opountion Locrida and Atalanti - Memories and testimonies." Part 3. Athens: Society for Historical and Folklore Research Atalanti (E.I.L.E.A.). (In Greek)
13. Christophorou K. Manthos 2001. "Timeline Opountios Atalanti and 4000 years – in brief" Ed: Municipality of Atalanti. (In Greek)
