= Abaeus =

Toponymic epithet for the Greek god Apollo

Abaeus (Ancient Greek: Ἀβαῖος) was a toponymic epithet of the Greek god Apollo, derived from the town of Abae in Phocis, where the god had a rich temple renowned for its oracles, which were said to have been consulted by Croesus and Mardonius, among others. This temple of Apollo Abaeus was destroyed by the Persians during the invasion of Xerxes, and a second time by the Boeotians. It was rebuilt by Hadrian.

== Sources ==
- Herodotus, Histories 8.33
- Pausanias, Description of Greece 10.33.1
