= Corseia =

Town of ancient Boeotia

Coordinates: 38°35′38″N 23°04′57″E

Corseia or Korseia (Ancient Greek: Κορσεία), or Chorsia (Χορσία), was town of ancient Boeotia, sometimes included in Opuntian Locris, was the first place which the traveller reached after crossing the mountains from Cyrtones. In the Third Sacred War it was taken by the Phocians, along with Orchomenus and Coroneia. In the plain below, the river Platanius joined the sea. When Pausanias visited in the 2nd century, he found a sacred grove of yews with a small image of Hermes in the open air, half a stadion from Corseia.

Corseia's site is located near the modern Neochori. There are remains of the walled enclosure and three towers that have been studied by John M. Fossey.
