= Malesina =

Malesina Μαλεσίνα
- Municipal unit
- Location within the regional unit

- Location within Greece
- Coordinates: 38°37′N 23°14′E
- Country: Greece
- Administrative region: Central Greece
- Regional unit: Phthiotis
- Municipality: Lokroi

Area
  - Municipal unit: 103.7 km^{2} (40.0 sq mi)

Population (2021)
  - Municipal unit: 4,200
  - Municipal unit density: 41/km^{2} (100/sq mi)
  - Community: 4,102
- Time zone: UTC+2 (EET)
  - Summer (DST): UTC+3 (EEST)
- Vehicle registration: ΜΙ

Malesina (Greek: Μαλεσίνα) is a town and a former municipality in Phthiotis, Greece. Since 2011 the local government reform, it became a part of the new municipality Lokroi, of which it is a municipal unit. The municipal unit has an area of 103.712 km^{2}. Malesina is located in the former Locris Province, in south-east Phthiotis. It is at the 125th kilometer of Greek National Road 1. The municipal unit covers the peninsula Aetolimni. The town is surrounded by olive groves, vines and fields. The town was founded by Arvanites settlers in between 1466 and 1485 the smallest city in Greece.

== Geography ==
The region of Malesina is known for its beaches on the Northern Gulf of Euboea. The beaches of Osmaes, Vlihada, Lekouna, Arsana each year gain the "Light blue Flag" for cleanliness. There are other beaches at Gorgolimano, Papa, Mourtitsa, Mantesiou, and Kakailias.

The region of Malesina has developed into an economy based on tourism, because of its landscape and location near Athens. but also because it possesses fertile grounds and olive groves. Many residents are working in the heavy industry of Larco and in new houses construction of the Osmaes settlement.

Malesina has a structured street plan, with structural blocks, squares, streets straight from one end until the other. The sewer system, as well as the system of biological cleaning shortages, are in the stage of their completion. It has 14th-state municipal school, high school, lyceum, kindergarten, day nursery, post-office, banks, cooperatives, athletic associations, grounds, rural surgery, private dental clinic, drugstores and Center for Elder Citizens. One kilometer out of the city there are the children's camps of Ministry of External Affairs, where each summer hundreds of children from the Dissemination are entertained.

The municipality of Malesina comprises the city of Malesina, the resort of Theologos, the settlement of Osmaes (Building Cooperative of Greek Army lifer Officers) and the villages Proskyna and Mazi. Also in the municipality of Malesina is the Byzantine nunnery of Saint George, as well as the archaeological sites of Alai Lokri (in Theologos), Korseias (Chiliadou or Paliokastro Proskyna) and Voumelitea (Chiliadou or Martino).
