= Megaplatanos =

Village in Macedonia, Greece

- Community
- Location within Greece
- Coordinates: 40°56′29″N 21°58′22″E
- Country: Greece
- Geographic region: Macedonia
- Administrative region: Central Macedonia
- Regional unit: Pella
- Municipality: Almopia
- Municipal unit: Aridaia

Population (2021)
  - Community: 452
- Time zone: UTC+2 (EET)
  - Summer (DST): UTC+3 (EEST)

Megaplatanos (Greek: Μεγαπλάτανος, before 1925: Μπίζοβο – Bizovo Macedonian: Бизово) is a village in Pella regional unit, Macedonia, Greece.

Megaplatanos had 382 inhabitants in 1981. In fieldwork done by anthropologist Riki Van Boeschoten in late 1993, Megaplatanos was populated by a Greek population descended from Anatolian Greek refugees who arrived during the Greek–Turkish population exchange, and Slavophones. The Macedonian language was spoken in the village by people over 30 in public and private settings. Children understood the language, but mostly did not use it. Pontic Greek was spoken in the village by people over 30 in public and private settings. Children understood the language, but mostly did not use it. Turkish was possibly spoken by people over 60, mainly in private.
