= Atalanti =

Atalanti Αταλάντη
- Municipal unit
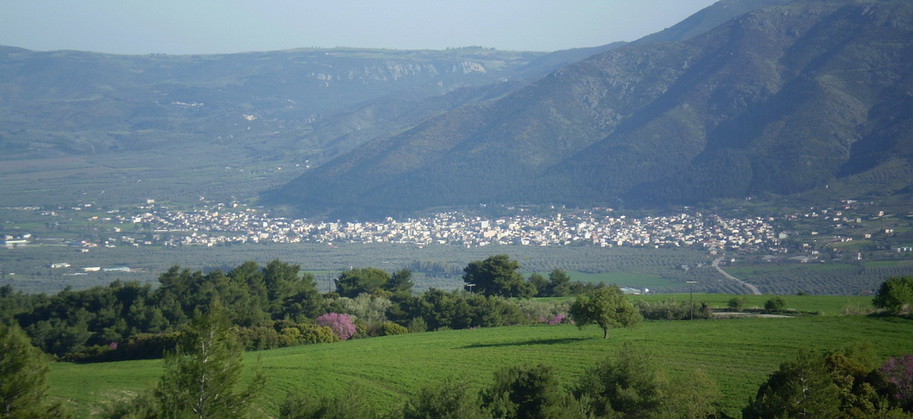
- Panoramic view

- Location within the regional unit

- Location within Greece
- Coordinates: 38°39′N 23°0′E
- Country: Greece
- Administrative region: Central Greece
- Regional unit: Phthiotis
- Municipality: Lokroi

Area
  - Municipal unit: 304.14 km^{2} (117.43 sq mi)
- Elevation: 85 m (279 ft)

Population (2021)
  - Municipal unit: 7,278
  - Municipal unit density: 23.93/km^{2} (61.98/sq mi)
  - Community: 4,661
- Time zone: UTC+2 (EET)
  - Summer (DST): UTC+3 (EEST)
- Postal code: 352 00
- Area code: 22330
- Vehicle registration: ΜΙ
- Website: www.atalanti.gr

Atalanti (Greek: Αταλάντη Atalantē) is the second largest town in Phthiotis, Greece. It is located southeast of Lamia, north of Livadeia and northwest of Chalcis. In 2011, it was incorporated into the municipality of Lokroi with an area of 614.7 km^{2} and a population of 19,623 (2011 census), of which it is the government seat and a municipal unit.

== Geography ==
The town can be accessed via the Greek National Road 1 (Athens – Lamia – Thessaloniki). It is situated in central Greece, surrounded by Mt. Knimida to the north, Mt. Chlomo to the south, Mt. Parnassus to the west, and the northern Eubean Gulf to the east. The area is characterized by high concentrations of magnesium and iron in the soil.

The municipal unit has an area of 304.141 km^{2}.

== Economy ==
Atalanti is known as a market town and was the capital of the former Locris Province. The town's geography has garnered it a reputation in Greece as a notable wine-producing hub.

== Subdivisions ==
The municipal unit, Atalanti, is subdivided into the following communities (with constituent villages in parentheses):

- Atalanti (Atalanti, Agios Vlasios, Palirroia, Skala)
- Exarchos
- Kalapodi
- Kyparissi (Kyparissi, Efkalyptos)
- Kyrtoni
- Megaplatanos
- Tragana (Tragana, Mikrovivos)

== Historical population ==
Year	Town population	Municipal unit population
1940	4,042	–
1981	5,562	–
1991	6,189	10,240
2001	6,127	10,367
2011	5,199	8,267
2021	4,661	7,278

== Mythology ==
The capital of Locris province was the city of Opus. According to Hesiodus and Plutarch, the city was named Opus after the son of Locros and the great-grandson of Deucalion and Pyrrha. The Locrians from Opus participated in the Trojan War, providing 40 battle ships and four thousand warriors. The leader of the Locrians was Ajax the Lesser, son of Oileus and grandson of Hodoedocus. Ajax excelled in the Trojan War, but while returning from Troy, he died in a storm. Another notable figure from Opus was Patroclus, son of Menoetius and best friend of Achilles. When he was still a child, Patroclus killed the nobleman Clysonymus, son of Amphidamas, during a game. Although he was a minor, Patroclus had to leave Opus in order to escape revenge. His father took him to Peleus, who raised him along with Achilles as his own child.

The name of the city is derived from the Greek mythology character Atalanta.

== History ==
=== Neolithic Age ===
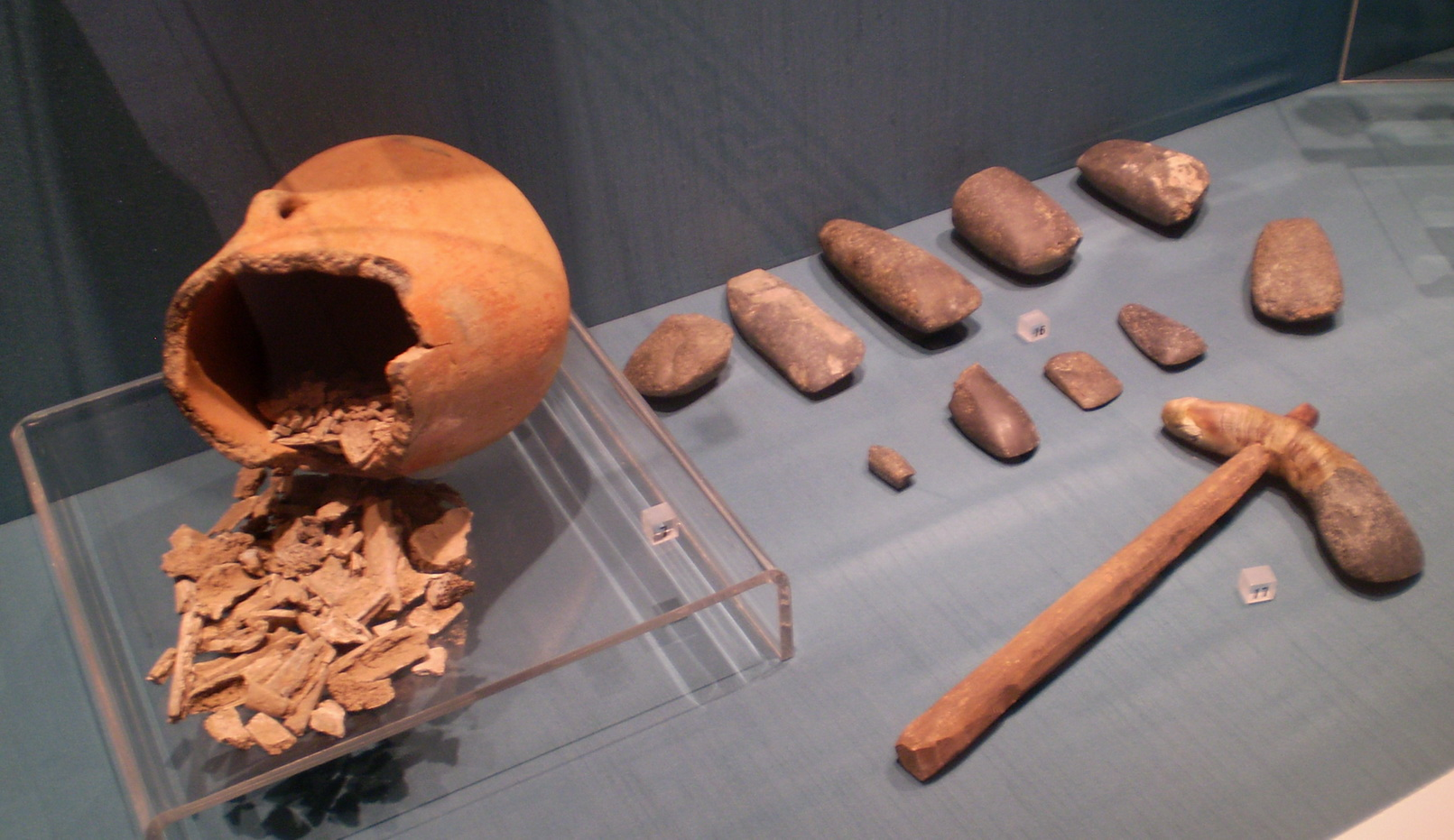
Neolithic tools in Atalanti's Archaeological Museum

The first signs of organized human life in Atalanti's region can be traced back to the Neolithic era (7000 BC – 3200–3100 BC) when the first town in the valley of Skala Atalanti was developing. All human activities of Neolithic man can be traced in this area: agriculture, stockbreeding, hunting, and fishing.

=== Bronze Age ===
The Early Helladic period (3200–2100 BC) saw the growth of trade (both land- and sea-borne) and the development of pottery. The area of Atalanti was influenced by other places in mainland Greece and the islands. This area, as well as others of this period, was characterized by a hierarchically organized society.

In the Middle Helladic period (2100–1600 BC), villages were destroyed (possibly due to the invasion of other Greek tribes). Because of this, retrogression, introversion and cultural isolation were noted.

Most possibly in the Late Helladic period (1600–1100 BC), the Mycenaean city, Opus, was built. Its inhabitants main occupations were fishing and agriculture (e.g., the cultivation of wheat, grain, legumes, olives, and grapes, as well as the production of wine).

During the 11th century BC (post-Mycenaean period), there was an economic and demographic decline. Old villages were abandoned and new villages were built in different locations. This period is mostly characterized by an adherence to tradition. Pottery making remained the main occupation.

=== Protogeometric Period ===
Between the 10th and 8th century BC, the regime of Opus was aristocracy and oligarchy. Hierarchy was one of the key features of society in that time. It was a society where classes owed their existence primarily to the differentiation between the distinct occupations of its inhabitants. Trade and shipping were growing. Opus was heavily influenced by art from Athens, Corinth, Euboea, and Thessaly. A massive production of vases and the blooming of metallurgy (weapons and gold jewelry) are recorded. All these suggest the existence of a prosperous and wealthy society in the region of Locris.

=== Archaic Period ===
During the Archaic period (700 – 480 BC) the system of government in Opus remained an oligarchy with no political controversy. This can perhaps be termed a "conservative democracy" since there were no slaves in Locris. The main inhabitants' main occupations continued to be agriculture, livestock (mainly cattle), fishing, pottery and wine production.

=== Classical period ===
Exhibits from Classical period in Atalanti's Archaeological Museum

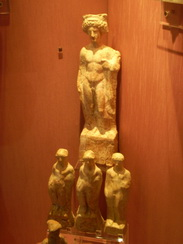
Statues in the museum

In the Classical Period (second quarter of 5th century BC – 323 BC), and more specifically during the Peloponnesian War (431 – 404 BC), the Locrians sided with Sparta (leader of the Peloponnesian League). The Athenians attacked and destroyed the coastal cities of Locris. In 431 BC they fortified the island of Atalanti (or Atalantonisi or Talantonisi) in order to curb the activities of Locrian pirates and to ensure the safety of the coast of Euboea. But an earthquake in 426 BC destroyed part of the walls and the fortress that were built in Atalantonisi.

=== Hellenistic and Roman Period ===
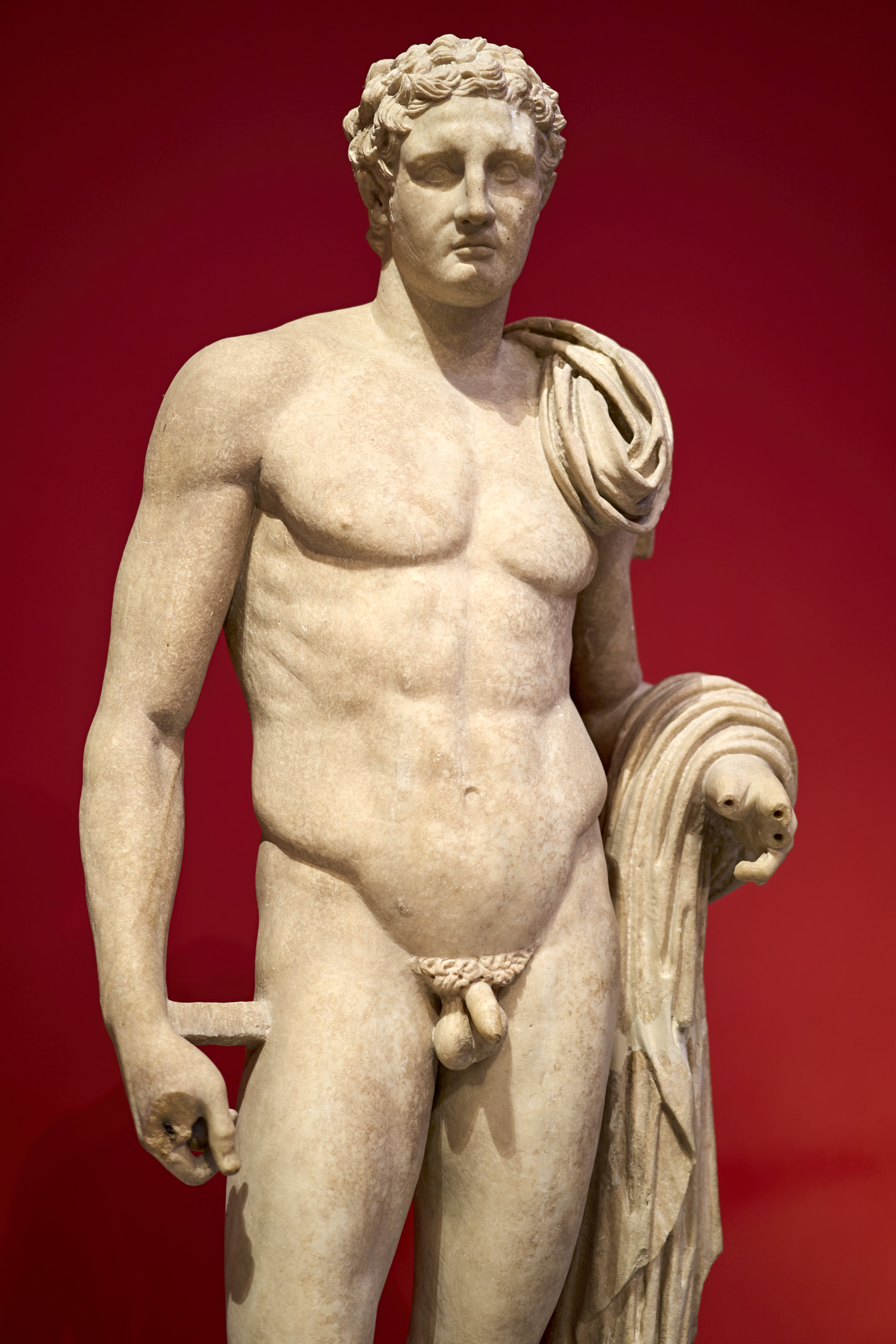
Atalante Hermes was discovered in Atalante, now in the Archaeological Museum of Athens.

During the Hellenistic period (336 or 323 BC – middle of 1st century BC) an earthquake in 300 BC destroyed part of Opus. In 204 BC, the Roman general Gaius Flaminius seized Opus, but in 197 BC he restored independence to the Locrians. In 165 BC, the Common of Locris was founded. Another earthquake in 106 BC destroyed Opus, but it was rebuilt again. The end of the Hellenistic period was sealed by the raid of Sulla (Lucius Cornelius Sulla Felix) around 87/86 BC. Throughout this period Opus remained a mainly rural economy. At the same time, Atalanti was the main center of pottery production in the district. The invasion of Sulla prompted many residents of the cities of Locris to abandon their villages during the Roman period (30 BC – 324 AD). The population mostly moved to the settlements of Opus and Kynos. In the area, large privately owned farms were created. In Atalanti, public baths and an aqueduct were built.

=== Early Christian Period ===
During early Christian times, the Diocess of Opus was founded (Ecumenical Synod or Council in Ephesus in 431 and in Chalcedon in 451 under the Diocese of Corinth. In the years 376 and 395–397 Goths and Visigoths (under Alaric I) invaded the area which had a negative effect on the local economy. Regression and in some cases abandonment of coastal settlements occurred.

=== Byzantine and Frankish periods ===
In 565, during the reign years of Justinian I, the name Talanti was first mentioned.

In the 9th century the Saracens raided the area and in the 10th century, the Bulgarians under Simeon I also attacked Locris.

Following the Fourth Crusade, a Frankish barony was established at Atalanti, under the Catalan noble Pere de Puigpardines. The Koulia tower (which was demolished in 1957) and probably the paliopyrgos were built at this time. The barony (La Calandri -in Catalan sources- or Talantum in Western sources) was a part of the Aragonese Duchy of Athens and one of the four major ports of the Duchy, that was based in Talanti (La Calandri).

In 1311, the Duchy of Athens had fallen into the hands of Catalan mercenaries of the Catalan Company after the victorious Battle of Halmyros. In 1380, the Navarrese Company made raids against the Catalans of Atalanti. In 1385, the area of Phthiotis fell into the hands of the Serbs, except for Atalanti. In 1388, the region of Locris passed into the hands of the Florentine Acciaioli family, ending the Catalan domination.

In 1393, the Diocese of Talanti was established. The same year the Ottoman Turks began their raids. The Duchy of Athens was abolished by the Ottomans in 1458, and the period of Ottoman rule for Atalanti and Locris in general began.

=== Ottoman period ===
According to the census of 1466, Atalanti had 248 families all of whom were Christians. In the census of 1506, there were 449 Christian and 13 Ottoman homes. In 1521, 435 Christian and 30 Ottoman homes were recorded. The residents of Atalanti did not pay any taxes as they were a waqf, while their children were free from the compulsory levy of children in the Ottoman army, in order to join the Janissaries (in Greek:Παιδομάζομα, in Turkish: devşirme). In return, the inhabitants of Atalanti had to protect the narrow sea and the coast when pirates attacked. Ottoman Archives also verify this statement and Muslim landlords of Talanda prevented the levy of children. For example, in 1646 (Hijri 1056), the trustee of the waqf of Grand Vizier Kemankeş Kara Mustafa Pasha, requested from the authorities that the devshirme officers should not disrupt the locals of the villages in Talanda, since they belonged to the Mustafa Pasha waqf and were exempt from devshirme.

According to the census of 1571 there were 622 Christian and 77 Ottoman homes in Atalanti. This made it the largest settlement across Locris, with a population of about 3,000 people. This also explains the upgrading of Atalanti during the next century which included the surrounding villages. The main occupations of the inhabitants were agriculture (cereals, viticulture), cultivation of flax, cotton and vegetables, as well as apiaries and livestock.

In 1688, during the Ottoman–Venetian war, Kourmas and the Bishop of Amfissa Philotheos temporarily seized Atalanti. The same year, plague broke out in Atalanti. The Turks reclaimed the city in a short time. Fearing retaliation, several families relocated to the Venetian Peloponnese between 1691 and 1697. Knowledge about the period of the 18th and early 19th century is limited and it is mostly based on reports by travellers.

One of them, William Martin Leake, visited Atalanti in 1805 and he wrote:

There are 300 houses in the town, one third of which is Turkish. Some of the houses are big and surrounded by a garden. They seem very pretty from a far distance. But most of them are abandoned and ruined, partly because of a plague that wiped out entire families a few years ago. The ruler is Isset Bey, a son of Kapicilar Kahyasi of Ali Pasha. The Greek neighborhood is separated from the Turkish. The Bishop of Atalanti which comes under the Bishop of Athens is the head of the Greek community and has a sustainable house, with a garden of orange, lemon and other fruit trees. A garden, that despite its ferocity, is the best place here, something extraordinary in that area. The valley is very fertile, but not cultivated, because of the absence of people. In low parts of the area, towards the sea, corn, excellent wheat, grapes from which they make a tolerable wine and a few olives grow perfectly. The average wage here is the same as that one in Athens and Livadeia. The administrative area includes thirty to forty villages, most of them very small, and not fully inhabitant, since most of their residents migrate to areas of Livadeia and Athens, since Ali Pasha took over the place. Incomes are now in the hands of Veli, who is trying to bring back immigrants, promising tax cuts.

Francois Pouqueville (between 1806 and 1816) reports: "Atalanti is built on the foothills of Mount Chlomos. Two mosques and a church are the only remarkable things you can see. The importance of the city is that twenty one villages depend on it."

According to other sources in 1800 there were more than 200 Ottoman families living in their own settlement in the western part of town. In this part of the town, the Turkish governor, treasurer, judge and a small Turkish guard of about 150 men were located.

Kodjabashis (Greek people who represented the Christian communities to the Ottomans) of Talanti were: Lambros Alexandrou (later renamed Evmolpidis), Constantinos Sakellion and Alexis Michalis. Nikolaos Metaxas, or Neophytos of Athens, was ordained Bishop of Talanti in 1803.

In 1810 the Ottoman doctor Hasan Agha Kourtalis was known to offer his services to both Greeks and Ottomans without any discrimination.

=== Atalanti during the Greek Revolution of 1821 ===
On 31 March 1821, Anthony Kontosopoulos and 1000 armed Locrians sieged and freed the city of Atalanti with the help of Lambros Eleftheriou and the rest of the residents of the city.

In the winter of that same year, the Turkish army under Omer Vrioni and Mehmet Kiosses passed Atalantonisi. The next year, Atalanti was burned again by the Turkish troops who were passing through the region and a plague fell on Atalantonisi.

In the Second National Assembly at Astros in 1823, Bishop Neophytos of Talanti and attorney Lambros Alexandrou represented the area. Provincial Governor of Talanti was replaced by Ioannis Filon. In 1824 the Turkish fleet occupied Atalantonisi, destroying its facilities, slaughtering or capturing those who had taken refuge there.

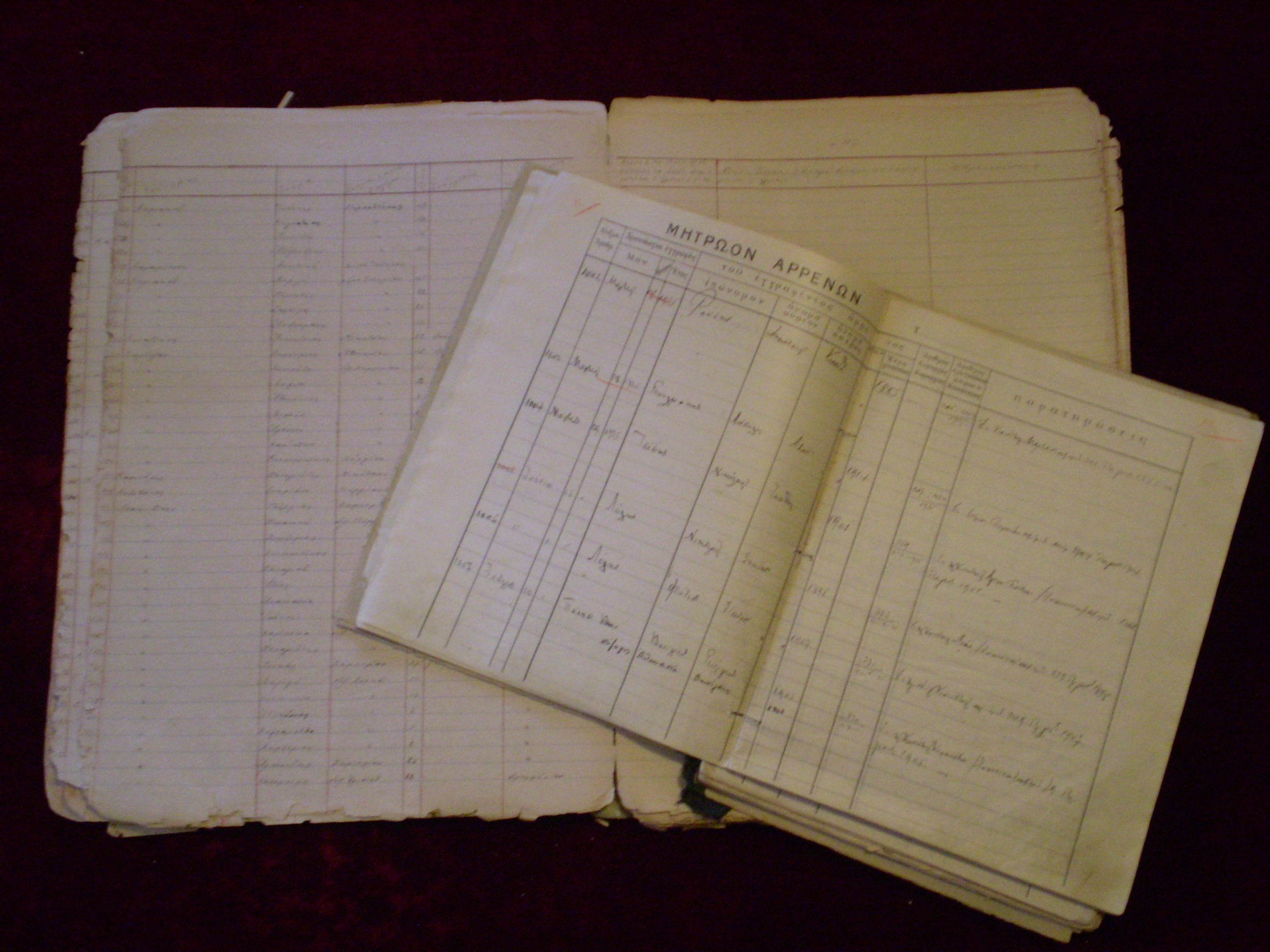
Archives for the Macedonian settlers in Nea Pelli district of Atalanti

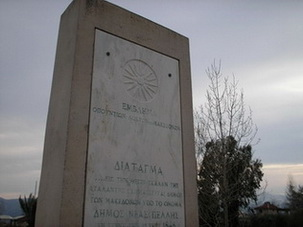
Stele for the Greek Macedonian settlers, refugees during the Greek War of Independence

Between 5 and 9 November 1826, the Battle of Atalanti took place. Anastasios Karatassos, Angelis Gatsos and Olivier Voutier lead 1500 Macedonians warriors. Mustafa Bey moved from Livadeia to Atalanti with an army of a few thousand men (infantry and horsemen) and surprised the Greek guards. After a fierce battle, the Greeks retreated having lost 42 men on the battlefield.

Gunpowder storehouses of vital importance to the Turks were located in Atalanti and guarded by two hundred Ottomans.

In 1826 Georgios Karaiskakis attempted to set the storehouses on fire but ultimately failed. The next year Karaiskakis placed a guard with his men, in Atalanti, under Spyros Xidis. Another attempt by Ioannis Kolettis in 1827, to take over Atalanti also failed. The final liberation of Atalanti came on 6 November 1828. Dimitris Liakopoulos (from Kato Milia, Pieria) mounted a surprise attack and released the city.

=== Atalanti in Independent Greece ===
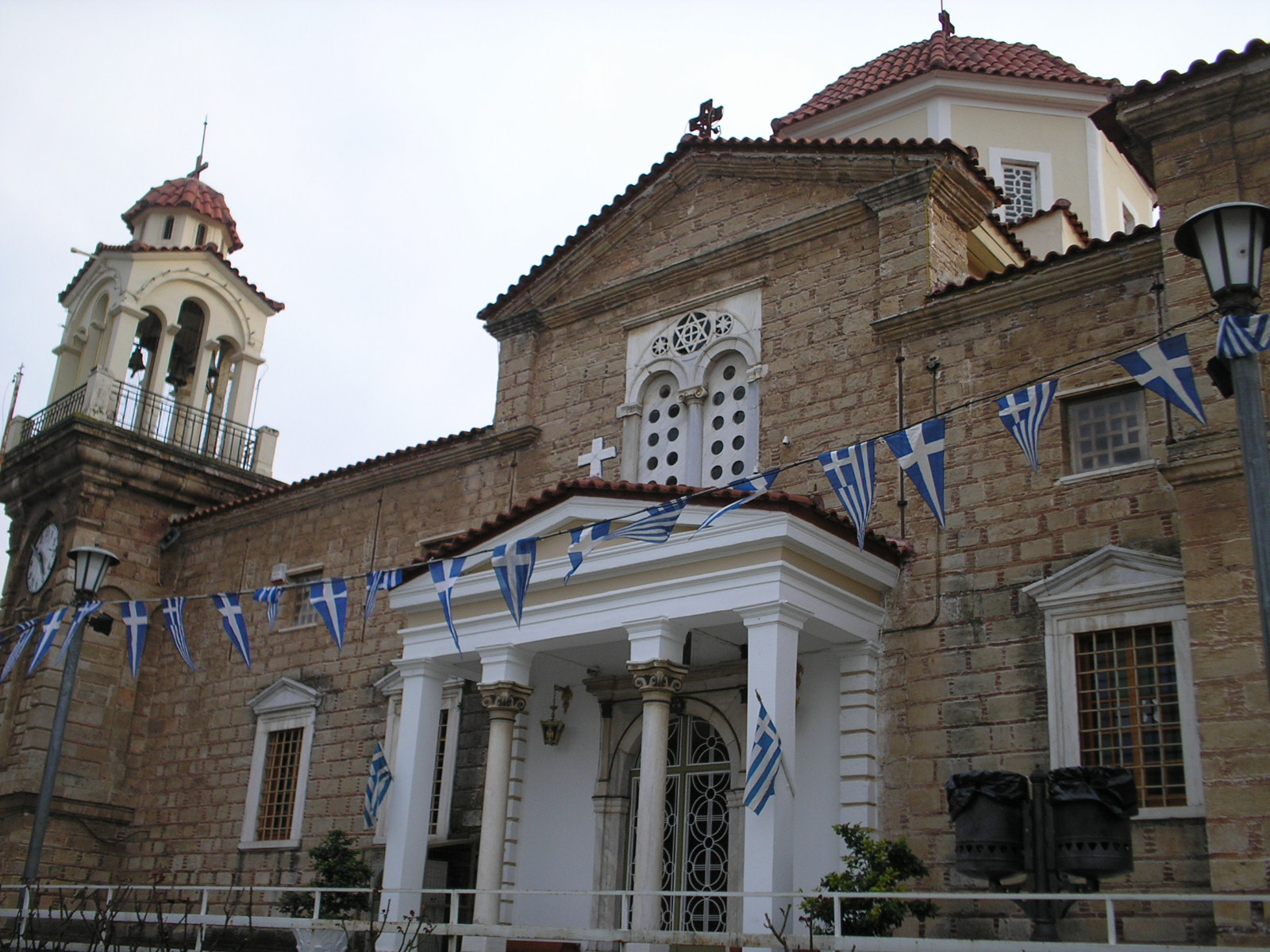
Saint Theodore Cathedral of Atalanti, located in the central square of the town

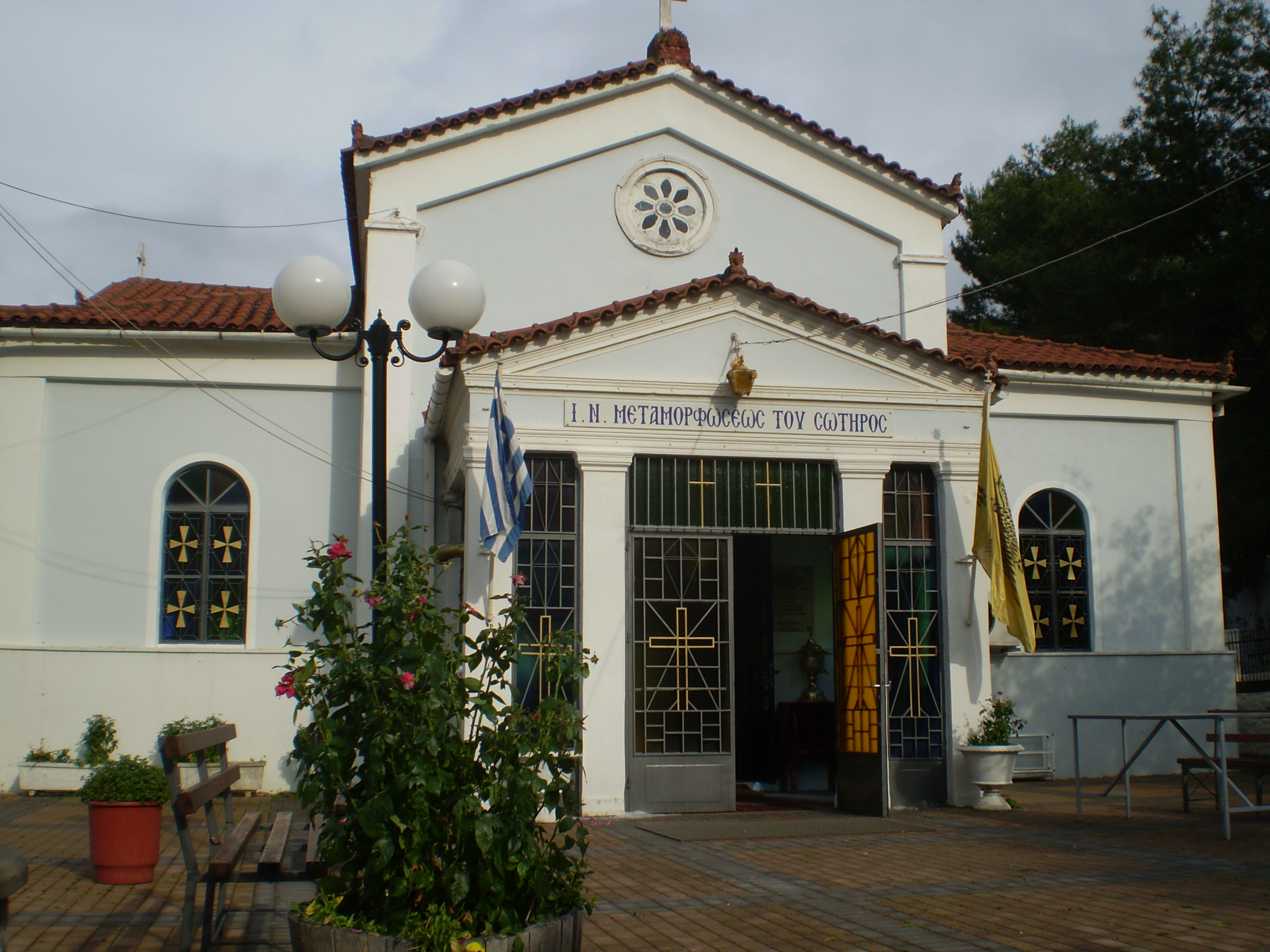
Metamorfosi Sotiros church

Several institutions were founded in 1831 in Atalanti following the liberation: a primary school (first teacher was D. Manasidis from Samos), a county court, a notary, tax authorities, a fund, a tobacco factory, customs, a forestry organization and a post office.

In 1833 the city was included in the prefecture of Phocis and Locris. The first prefect was Ioannis Amvrosiadis and the district officer was Anagnostis Mostras. A diocese of Locris was established (from the dioceses of Mendenitsa and Talanti), under Bishop Agathangelos Myrianthousis. That same year, Macedonian fighters who fought during the revolution of 1821 started to settle permanently in Atalanti.

On 10 January 1834, the City of Atalanti was established by law. It included several villages outside of the original Atalanti: Skala, Skenteraga (Megaplatanos), Kyparissi, Kolaka, Bogdanos, Exarchos and Drouskos. The first elected mayor, in 1836, was Efstathios Spyridonos.

In December 1836, Konstantinos D. Vellios, a benefactor of the Macedonian settlers, arrived at Atalanti. The Municipality of Pella in Atalanti was established in 1837 through a Royal Decree for the Macedonians settlers.

A Greek boarding school was founded in 1843 and a primary school for girls was established in 1857. In 1855 the Cathedral of St. Theodore was founded in Atalanti, and in 1862 the Church of the Transfiguration of Jesus was finished. In 1860 seven large fountains were built in the neighborhoods of Atalanti and New Pella.

In 1864 the first annual Atalanti trade fair began. It lasts from 6 to 12 August and has been held every year since it was established.

In 1871 the road between Atalanti and Scala was constructed. In 1873 a branch of the National Bank of Greece was founded. The Revolution of Litochoro (Revolution of Olympus) in 1878, was led by the Macedonian Kosmas Doumpiotis, who had several fellow volunteers from New Pella Atalanti by his side.

In 1885 oil lamps for lighting the city were installed and an aqueduct was built.

Nicholas K. Abraham was born in 1888 in New Pella. He served as a Minister of Justice and Maritime Affairs.

The earthquake of 1894 caused major damage throughout Locris. 255 people were killed and 3,783 houses collapsed.

At the time sericulture was at its peak in many households in Atalanti.

In 1895 the Locris Gymnastics Club of Atalanti was founded. It was one of the first clubs in the country and also one of the 28 clubs that founded the S.E.A.G.S. later known as the S.E.G.A.S.

Nicholas Doumpiotis (born in 1866 in New Pella) participated in the Macedonian Struggle (1904–1908) as an officer under the nickname "Captain Amyntas".

=== 20th century ===
In 1912 the municipalities of Atalanti and New Pella were abolished and they became communities. The first car appeared in Atalanti in 1915.

In March 1913, Greek villagers from Thrace were forced to leave. The people from Plavou did not feel safe and could not remain there any longer, so decided to move from Ottoman territory. They moved without any property and went to Greece. Some went to Athens, others went to the area of Lamia (Kostalexi, Stavros, Roditsa) but most of them came to Atalanti.

Between 1912 and 1922, 63 soldiers from Atalanti were lost in the wars (Balkan Wars, First World War and Asia Minor Campaign).

After the Asia Minor disaster in 1922, 218 individuals arrived in Atalanti. In 1931, officials declared that 30 acres of land in the Atalanti area would be used by the refugees. This area of Atalanti was named, Sinoikismos. In 1926, the "Refugee Association of Atalanti and Suburbs" was founded. Its main objectives were claiming damages, issuing identity documents to the refugees, offering help with finding jobs and offering general support.

In 1923 the Commercial Club was founded in Atalanti. In 1927 the Agricultural Credit Cooperative and the Mandolinata were established and a branch of Bank of Athens started to operate within the city. The first mill also began to function in 1927.

"Ajax the Locrian Gymnastics Club" (Greek: Γ.Σ. Αίας ο Λοκρός) was founded in 1928 for football, and track and field.

Also the "Union of Atalanti Melissa" began the reforestation of mountain Roda. A powerhouse was established which contributed to the electrification of households in the city.

Vasilios A. Kokkinos was born in Ano Pella in Atalanti in 1929. He later served as president of the Supreme Court (1990–1996).

In 1931, the "Association of New Pella Alexander the Great" was founded, such as the Olympiakos Atalanti football club. That same year the Ajax the Locrian sports club successfully organized a local athletic event in Atalanti.

The Primary School for Boys and Girls that was later used as the first Elementary School in Atalanti was built in 1932. In 1933 the Scouts group was founded.

Siblings Charilaos, Demosthenes and George Constantinou from Atalanti established the famous tobacco industry Santé in Athens.

The "Music Society of Atalanti Orpheus" was founded in 1935. In 1936, the union sports association was established. In 1937 a branch of the Agricultural Bank of Greece opened in Atalanti. In 1938 the Chorus of Atalanti made its first appearance. In 1939 the Union of Agricultural Cooperatives in Atalanti was founded.

On 20 April 1941 the German air force (Luftwaffe) bombed Atalanti causing only damages to buildings and on 25 April 1941 the German army occupied Atalanti. The White Cross of Atalanti was founded in 1943 to help those in need.

Funeral of the executed civilians of Atalanti in March 1943

On 23 March 1943 the Italian occupation forces left the city. The Germans took the place of the Italians and they withdrew from Atalanti in October 1944.

Due to the peculiar soil, and the inability of the Greek state to support the people of Evrytania, after the liberation of 1944 they began to leave their homeland and moved to the surrounding plains like the one in Atalanti and the other urban centers around them. That lasted from 1945 until 1987. Also the earthquake that took place at Vracha with a 6.2 magnitude on the Richter scale on 5 February 1966 also prompted more relocation again to Atalanti.

During the Greek Civil War (1946–1949), several—mostly young people—were found in two conflicting camps, the National Army (Greek government's army) and the Democratic Army of Greece(DSE or Greek initials ΔΣΕ). Eight National Army's soldiers and an unknown number of DSE fighters were killed.

In the decade of the 1950s, local elections were carried out after 16 years in 1951. The city's water supply system was installed in 1953. The current Atalanti's city plan was adopted in 1954 and the Sunday Bank Holiday was established by the Commercial Union in 1957.

In the next decade: the first kindergarten (1963) and the Municipal Library of Atalanti (1965) were founded. A branch of the Emporiki Bank opened, and the educational, cultural and entertainment association Proodos (The Progress) was established (1966).

Atalanti FC was created in 1968 by the merger of the two city clubs (Ajax and Olympiakos). The military dictatorship (1967–1974) ended the City Boards and the Cooperative Societies. During this period, the city hall, high school, kindergarten and the National Stadium of Atalanti were built.

During the Turkish invasion in Cyprus (20–21 July 1974) the soldier Christos L. Ligdis was killed.

In 1975 the Association "Agia Sofia of Asia Minor Refugees in Sinoikismos" was founded to preserve the culture of the refugees.

In 1976 the Constantinian Cultural Center of Atalanti was built, and in 1979 the Technical High School was founded.

In 1980 the "Locros Sports Mountaineering Association" was founded; in 1992 it was renamed Locros Sports Association with the addition of more sports.

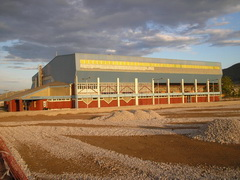
Atalanti's indoor hall

In 1982 the Nautical Club of Atalanti was founded. In 1985 the Municipal Conservatory was established, and in 1988 the municipal fish farm in the Bay of Atalanti was created. In 1989 the town's indoor hall (capacity: 1,100 seats) was built. The same year the History and Folklore Research of Atalanti Company was also founded.

In 1992, the "Athletic Football Club, Atalanti '92" was founded and the first town's private radio station began to broadcast.

Since 1993 economic migrants from Balkan countries (Albania, Bulgaria, Romania), central Europe (Poland) and Asia (Pakistan, India, China) begin to settle permanently or temporarily in the town.

In 1998 the Archaeological Museum of Atalanti opened and the Aianteios Municipal Theatre began operating.

In 2010, Atalanti, under the Kallikratis plan, joined with the municipalities of Malesina, Opountia and Dafnousia and formed the municipality of Locris (or municipality Lokroi). The seat of the municipality became the town of Atalanti.

== Tourism – Sightseeing – Cultural Activities ==
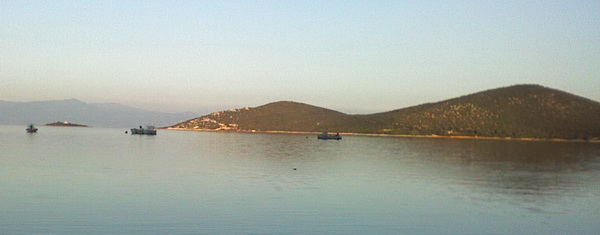
Talantonisi

Among the points of interest in the region are:

The catacomb of St. Athanasius or Chamaithanasis in the center of town is a Roman crypt. It is said that during the Ottoman occupation it was used as a secret school (Krifo scholio). Behind the catacomb is St. Athanasius Church. The church of St. Seraphim is located in the forest above the town of Atalanti. The monastery of St. Anargiri, built in the 17th century, is located on the main road from Atalanti to Kirtoni. The chapel of St. John the Roda, is built on top of Roda mountain.

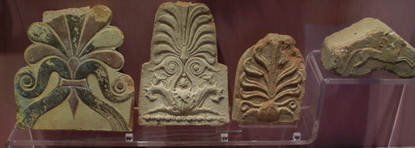
Exhibits in Atalanti's museum

The archaeological museum of Atalanti was inaugurated in the summer of 1998 by the City of Atalanti. The 14th Ephorate of Prehistoric and Classical Antiquities was built by the municipality of Atalanti, the Hellenic Ministry of Culture with financial assistance from donors. It is a relatively small but very important neoclassical building which used to be the area's old high school. The exhibits come from the region of Locris. They are divided into chronological and thematic sections and cover the prehistoric and historic periods up until Roman times. In the museum, and at the museum's courtyard, visitors can see tombstones, pottery for everyday use, tools, jewelry, idols, etc.

Just 6 km (3.7 mi) from Atalanti is the port of Skala Atalanti, with many fish restaurants, cafes and bars. Skala is one of the most beautiful sandy beaches in Locris. It is Atalanti's main beach. It is relatively long and wide and well organized and has many restaurants. Also along the beach there are playgrounds and a Beach volleyball and a tennis court. The beach also has water sports. It has been a Blue Flag beach since the 1980s. The port authority is located in Skala. Atalanti is home to football club A.P.O. Atalanti F.C..

In the area there are the churches of Analipsi and of Panagia.

The Atalanti Lagoon is located south of the bay of Atalanti. It is a shallow coastal lagoon with a narrow opening to the sea that is separated from it by a strip of land connected.

The Council of Atalanti, in cooperation with local city cultural institutions, holds many cultural events:

=== Carnival ===
This custom began around the late 1970s. It begins in the Pre-Lenten Season and th city's cultural clubs host carnival dances for all ages. In the early days people used to masquerade and pay visits to friendly homes asking them the classic game of "guess who I am." The main parade consists of walking groups and floats that satirize current issues and affairs. Schools, clubs and many volunteers participate. They pass by as the crowds cheer them on. A feast takes place at the town's main street. At the end in the central square the carnival's traditional bonfire takes place. Before that, there is dancing and singing around the gaitanaki. On the next day of the carnival, (Kathara Deftera) everybody heads to the Skala beach. There Lent is celebrated. The City of Atalanti established this day and each year it offers its guests traditional soup, Lent meals, wine and halva (a traditional sweet). Young and old try to fly kites as high as they can.

=== Wine Festival ===
Each fall, after the grape harvest the wine festival takes place. It is a fiesta with no specific date but was established in 1996 by the City of Atalanti. The area has a tradition of wine production. Two places in the valley are named Kato and Pano Ampelia (vines). A feast takes place in the central square. Traditional music and food prevail, and visitors can drink free wine. The wine provided by the local wine producers. Atalanti is home to one of the largest Greek wineries Domaine Hatzimichalis with over of 200 hectares of land.

=== Sardine Festival ===
Every July the traditional feast of sardines takes place. It is also a fiesta without a specific date. The festival takes place in Skala, Atalanti. The City of Atalanti, in collaboration with the Scala cultural associations organize a great feast where sardines, wine, salad and bread are served free of charge to guests. The feast is accompanied by traditional bands that play music.

=== Choral Festival of Atalanti ===
The Choral Festival of Atalanti began in the early 1980s and continues to this day. In 2011 it completed 30 years of continuous activity. Until 1996 the festival took place at the main city square, but since 1997 and until now the festival is organized in the Aianteio Municipal Theatre of Atalanti. It is carried out always in June but not on a specific date. Besides the locals choirs Armonia (Harmony), Proodos (Progress), and the Chorus of Atalanti, choirs from all over Greece and abroad also participate at the festival.

=== Annual trade fair ===
On 6 August each year, the Transfiguration of Christ, is celebrated for six days with a trade fair in Atalanti. It is otherwise called Pazaria (Bazaar). This celebration began in the 18th century and was originally a cattle market. As the city evolved it became a trade fair. In the center, Atalanti retailers gather from different regions of the country and sell their merchandise. They also offer evenings with traditional music in the town square and in shops where visitors can eat and drink.

== People ==
- Panagiotis Danglis, military officer

== See also ==
- Atalanti Island
- List of settlements in Phthiotis

== Sources ==
- Dakoronia F. Kotoulas D., Baltas E. Tolias B Sythiakakis B. Locris – History & Culture. Publisher: Hatzimichalis Estate(In Greek)
- Efstathios Kaklamanos El. 1980. Atalanti 1800–1828. Thessaloniki: Publications Dioscuri. (In Greek)
- Karastathis Costas B. 2001. The Passion of the Greek genus. Athens. Publisher: Tinos.(In Greek)
- Constantinio Cultural Center of Atalanti. 2011. Atalanti – Historical Photographs. Athens 2011. Publications: Bartzoulianos (In Greek)
- "Chronicles of Locris". 1995. Athens: Annual Publication of Historical and Folklore Society Research of Atalanti (E.I.L.E.A.). Volume and Year 1. (In Greek)
- "Chronicles of Locris". 1997. Athens: Annual Publication of Historical and Folklore Society Research of Atalanti (E.I.L.E.A.). Volume and Year 3.(In Greek)
- Mavinidis C. "The people from Plavou and their village".(In Greek)
- Magazine "Apoplous." Issue 1. 2002. Edition Musical Cultural Association "Chorus of Atalanti." (In Greek)
- Magazine "Apoplous." Issue 2. 2002. Edition Musical Cultural Association "Chorus of Atalanti."(In Greek)
- Magazine "Apoplous." Issue 3–4. 2002. Edition Musical Cultural Association "Chorus of Atalanti."(In Greek)
- Magazine "Apoplous." Issue 6. 2002. Edition Musical Cultural Association "Chorus of Atalanti."(In Greek)
- Magazine "Apoplous." Issue. 38, 2009. Edition Musical Cultural Association "Chorus of Atalanti."(In Greek)
- Protopapas Zissis. 1952. "Locris". Athens 1952. pp. 20–23 (In Greek)
- Rizopoulos. N. 2005. "Atalanti – Brief Retrospective, Myths-History-Experiences-Memories." p. 29. (In Greek)
- Theodore Tzoumekis. 1998. "Refugee Facilities in Fthiotida in the first half of the 20th century." Thessaloniki.(In Greek)
- Christophorou K. Manthos 1991." Opountion Locris and Atalanti – Memories and testimonies." Part 1. Athens: Society for Historical and Folklore Research of Atalanti (E.I.L.E.A.). (In Greek)
- Christophorou K. Manthos 1993." Opountion Locris and Atalanti – Memories and testimonies." Part 2. Athens: Society for Historical and Folklore Research of Atalanti (E.I.L.E.A.). (In Greek)
- Christophorou K. Manthos 1995." Opountion Locris and Atalanti – Memories and testimonies." Part 3. Athens: Society for Historical and Folklore Research of Atalanti (E.I.L.E.A.).(In Greek)
- Christophorou K. Manthos 2001. "Timeline for Opous and Atalanti A Summary of 4000 years." Edition City of Atalanti. (In Greek)
