= Hyettus =

Figure in Greek mythology

In Greek mythology, Hyettus (Ancient Greek: Ὕηττος - Hyettos) was a native of Argos thought to have been the first man ever to have exacted vengeance over adultery: he reputedly killed Molurus, whom he had caught with his wife, and was sent into exile. King Orchomenus of Boeotia received him hospitably and assigned to him some land, where the village Hyettus was subsequently founded and named after him.
