= Lokroi (municipality) =

Lokroi Λοκροί
- Municipality
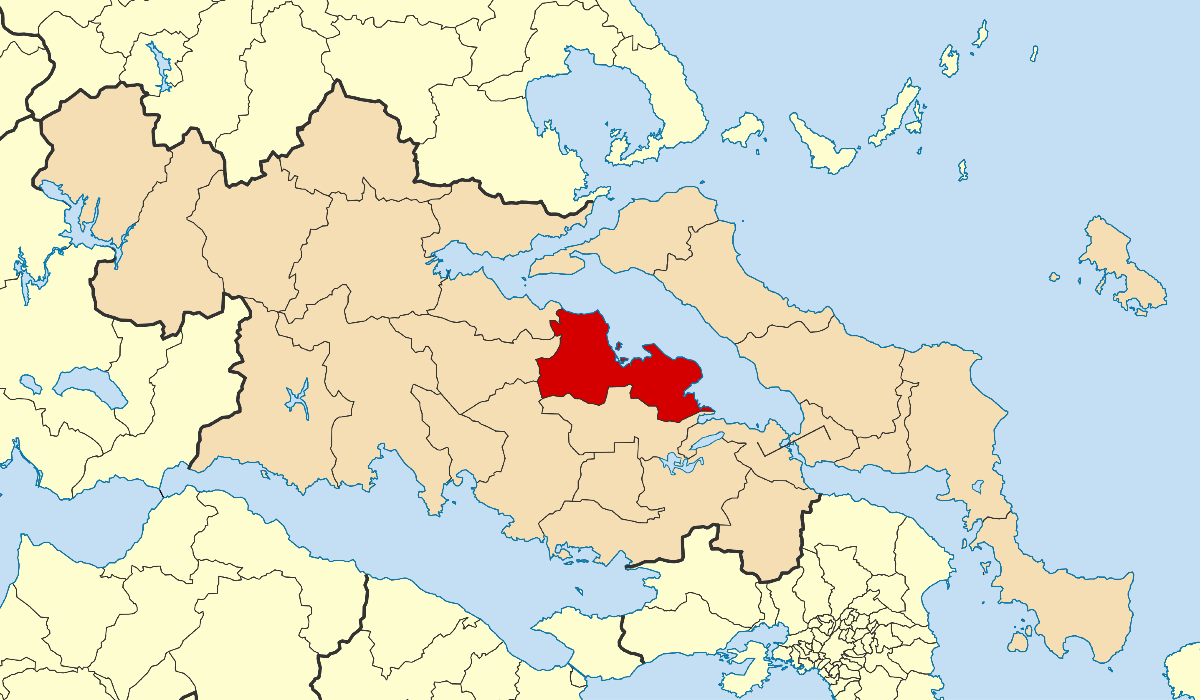

- Location within Greece
- Coordinates: 38°39′N 23°0′E
- Country: Greece
- Administrative region: Central Greece
- Regional unit: Phthiotis
- Seat: Atalanti

Area
  - Municipality: 614.8 km^{2} (237.4 sq mi)

Population (2021)
  - Municipality: 17,788
  - Density: 28.93/km^{2} (74.94/sq mi)
- Time zone: UTC+2 (EET)
  - Summer (DST): UTC+3 (EEST)

Lokroi (Greek: Λοκροί) is a municipality in the Phthiotis regional unit, Central Greece, Greece. The seat of the municipality is the town Atalanti. The municipal unit has an area of 614.761 km^{2}.

== Etymology ==
The municipality of Lokroi is named after the Lokroi, known in English as the Locrians, an ancient Greek tribe inhabiting Locris. They are supposed to have been the descendants of the mythological Locrus after whom they were named.

== Municipality ==
The municipality Lokroi was formed at the 2011 local government reform by the merger of the following 4 former municipalities, that became municipal units:

- Atalanti
- Dafnousia
- Malesina
- Opountioi
