= List of cities in ancient Acarnania =

Acarnania is a region of western Greece. Below is a list of the cities that existed in Acarnania in ancient times.

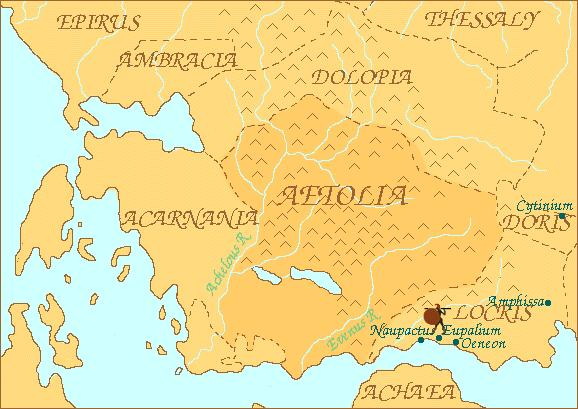
The ancient Region of Acarnania, Greece.

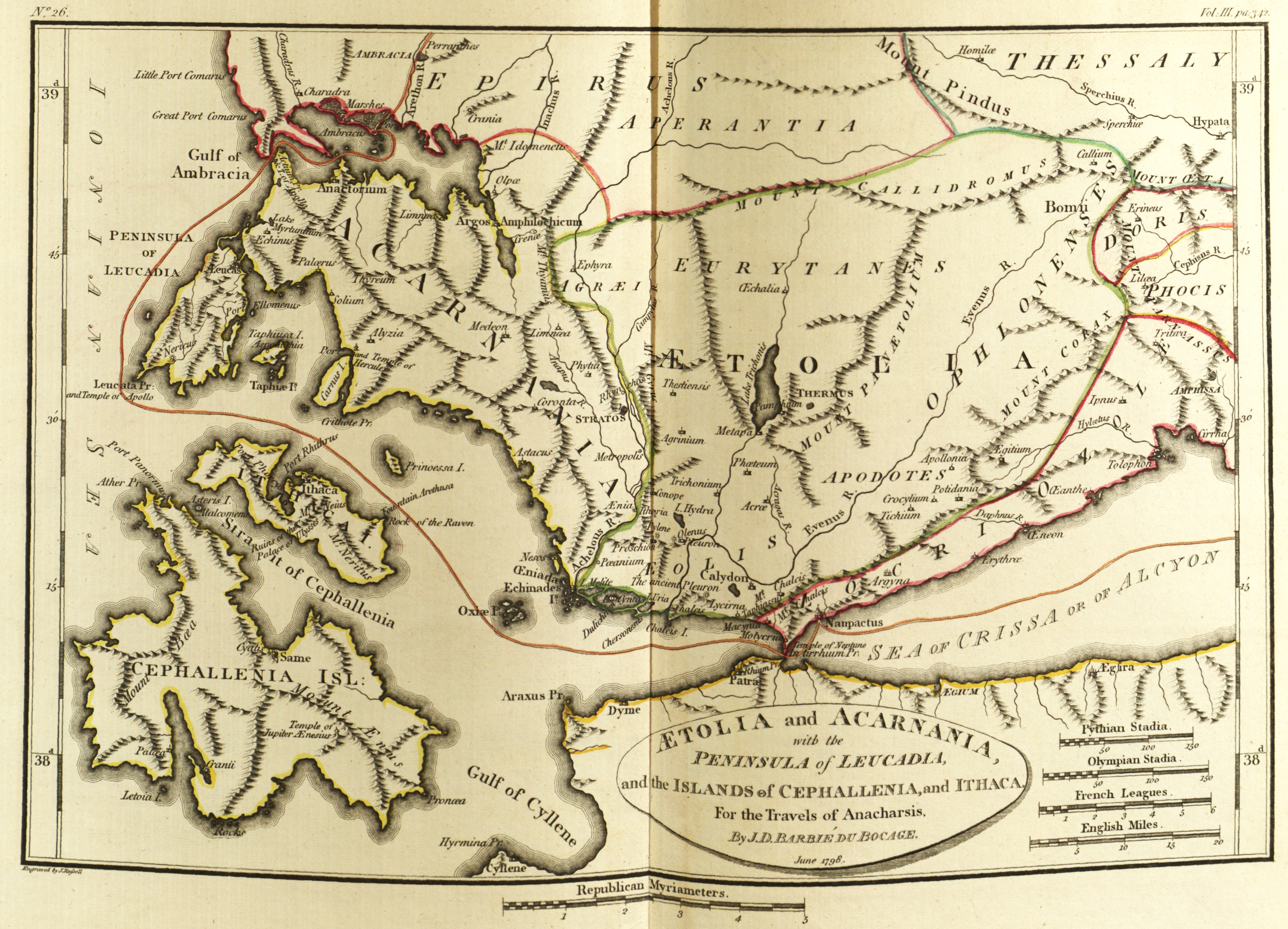
Map of ancient Acarnania

== Cities ==
- Alyzeia founded by Corinthians polis
- Ambracia founded by Corinthians 650 BC polis
- Ambrakos pre Hellenistic fortress
- Amphilochia
- Anaktorion founded by Corinthians and Corcyrans 650 BC polis
- Ancient Paleros or Palairos polis
- Amphilochian Argos founded by Ambrakians polis
- Astakos founded by Corinthians
- Corcyra (Acarnania) founded by Corinthians 706 BC
- Coronta polis
- Dioryktos pre Hellenistic settlement
- Echinus (Acarnania) polis
- Ellomenon pre Hellenistic settlement
- Euboia (Acarnania) pre Hellenistic
- Euripus (Acarnania) polis
- Herakleia (Acarnania) polis
- Hyporeiai polis
- Idomene (polis) pre Hellenistic fortress & sanctuary
- Ithaka (polis) polis
- Ithoria pre Hellenistic fortress
- Kraneia pre Hellenistic fortress
- Kranioi polis
- Krenai pre Hellenistic
- Leukas (polis) or Leucas (Epirus) founded by Corinthians 650 BC polis
- Limnaia polis
- Matropolis polis
- Medion (polis) polis
- Metropolis (polis) pre Hellenistic
- Nellos pre Hellenistic fortress
- Nerikos pre Hellenistic
- Nerikos pre Hellenistic fortress
- Nesos pre Hellenistic harbour
- Nicopolis founded by Octavian founded 31 BC
- Oiniadai polis
- Olpai pre Hellenistic fortress
- Palaerus
- Paleis polis
- Phara polis
- Phoitiai polis
- Pronnoi polis
- Ptychia pre Hellenistic
- Same (polis) polis
- Sauria (polis) pre Hellenistic fortress
- Sollion or Sollium founded by Corinthians polis
- Stratos (polis) polis
- Thyrreion polis
- Torybeia polis
- Zakynthos (polis) founded by Achaians polis
