= Ithaca =

Ithaca most commonly refers to:

- Homer's Ithaca, an island featured in Homer's Odyssey
- Ithaca (island), an island in Greece, possibly Homer's Ithaca
- Ithaca, New York, a city, and home of Cornell University and Ithaca College

Ithaca, Ithaka or Ithica may also refer to:

== Places ==
=== Australia ===
- Ithaca, Queensland, a neighbourhood in Brisbane
  - Ithaca Division, a former local government area
  - Shire of Ithaca, a former local government area
  - Town of Ithaca, a former local government area
- Ithaca Creek, a creek in Brisbane
- Ithaca Creek State School, Bardon, Brisbane

=== Greece ===
- Ithaca (regional unit), the 2nd level administrative division
- Ithaca (polis), an ancient city

=== United States ===
- Ithaca, Georgia, a place in Georgia
- Ithaca, Michigan
- Ithaca, Nebraska
- Ithaca (town), New York, a town in Tompkins County
- Ithaca, New York, the legally-distinct city also in Tompkins County
- Ithaca Pottery Site, an archaeological site in New York
- Ithaca, Ohio
- Ithaca, Wisconsin, a town
  - Ithaca (community), Wisconsin, in the town

== Education ==
- Ithaca Public Schools, Michigan
  - Ithaca High School (Michigan)
- Ithaca City School District, New York
  - Ithaca High School (Ithaca, New York)
- Ithaca College, New York

== Literature ==
- Ithaka (play), a 1996 play by Botho Strauss
- "Ithaca" (Ulysses episode), an episode in James Joyce's novel Ulysses
- Ithaca (poem), a poem by Constantine P. Cavafy
- Ithaca, California, the setting for William Saroyan's novel The Human Comedy
- Ithaca, a no-ship in the Dune fictional universe
- Ithaka, a young-adult novel by Adèle Geras

== Film ==
- Ithaca (film), a 2015 American film
- Project Ithaca, a 2019 sci-fi film by Anthony Artibello and Kevin C. Bjerkness
- Ithaka (film), a 2021 Australian documentary film about the campaign to free Julian Assange

== Music ==
- Ithaca (Paula Cole album), 2010
- Ithaca (Barry Guy, Marilyn Crispell, and Paul Lytton album), 2004
- "Ithaca", a song by Peter Mulvey from Glencree, 1999
- Ithaca (band)

== Transportation ==
- Ithaca Bus Station, a former bus terminal in Ithaca, New York
- Ithaca Central Railroad, a shortline railroad
- Ithaca station (Lehigh Valley Railroad), a former railroad station
- Ithaca Tompkins International Airport (ITH)

== People ==
- Ithaka (artist), American musician, writer, and artist
- Ithaka Maria (born 1979), Estonian singer and songwriter
- Craig Horner (born 1983), Australian actor and musician who has recorded as Ithaca

== Other uses ==
- Ithaka Harbors, publisher of academic journals in JSTOR
- 1151 Ithaka, an asteroid
- Ithaca Chasma, a valley on Saturn's moon Tethys
- Ithaca Energy, a British energy company
- Ithaca Gun Company, a US shotgun and rifle manufacturer
- Ithaca InterSystems, a defunct microcomputer manufacturer
- SS Ithaka, a shipwreck near the port of Churchill, Manitoba, in Hudson's Bay
