= Drymos =

Drymos (Δρυμός) may refer to several places in Greece:

- Drymos, Achaea, a village in the municipal unit Kleitoria, Achaea
- Drymos, Aetolia-Acarnania, a village in the municipal unit Anaktorio, Aetolia-Acarnania
- Drymos, Laconia, a village in the municipality East Mani, Laconia
- Drymos, Larissa, a village in the municipality Elassona, Larissa regional unit
- Drymos, Thessaloniki, a village in the municipal unit Mygdonia, Thessaloniki regional unit
- Drymos (Acarnania), a town of ancient Acarnania
- Drymos (Attica), a fortress of ancient Attica
- Drymos (Phocis), a town of ancient Phocis
