= Achyra =

Achyra Αχυρά
- Community
- Location within Greece
- Coordinates: 38°47′N 21°2′E
- Country: Greece
- Administrative region: West Greece
- Regional unit: Aetolia-Acarnania
- Municipality: Aktio-Vonitsa
- Municipal unit: Medeon

Population (2021)
  - Community: 101
- Time zone: UTC+2 (EET)
  - Summer (DST): UTC+3 (EEST)
- Postal code: 300 06
- Vehicle registration: AI

Achyra (Greek: Αχυρά) is a village and a community in the Medeon municipal unit, Aetolia-Acarnania, Greece. It was originally situated on a mountain slope, 7 km west of Katouna, 13 km east of Palairos and 37 km northwest of Agrinio but at some point in the 20th century a landslide took away part of the village and it was subsequently moved to its present location on the outskirts of Katouna.

== Population ==
Year	Population
2001	88
2011	117
2021	104

== See also ==
- List of settlements in Aetolia-Acarnania
