= Koukoumitsa of Aetolia-Acarnania =

Islet in the Ambracian Gulf, Greece

Koukoumitsa
Κουκουμίτσα
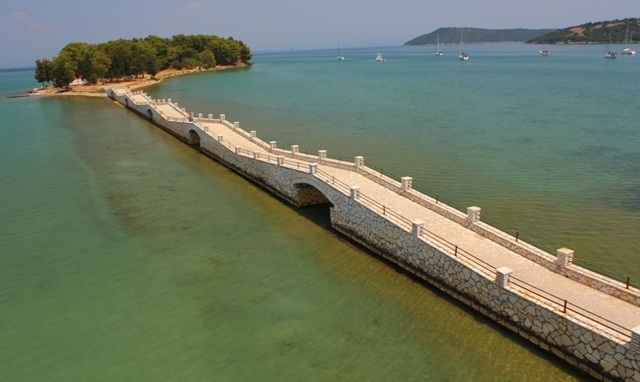
- Drone capture of Koukoumitsa from 2015

- Location of Koukoumitsa within Greece

Geography
- Location: Ambracian Gulf, Vonitsa, Greece
- Coordinates: 38°55′36″N 20°54′02″E
- Type: Island
- Archipelago: Ionian Sea

Administration
- Greece, Aktio-Vonitsa

Koukoumitsa is a pine-covered islet located in the Ambracian Gulf north east of Vonitsa.

The islet is connected by a footbridge to the opposite shore, where the Saltini Grove is located. On it is built a small chapel dedicated to Saint Nektarios. The island is a popular tourist attraction in Vonitsa during the summer. During the summer, several cultural events take place there and it is an ideal place for walks and sailing visits.

Administratively, Koukoumítsa belongs to Aktio-Vonitsa municipality, Aitolia-Akarnania region, Western Greece.
