= Achelous (disambiguation) =

Achelous (ancient Greek: Ἀχελῷος) is a river god in Greek mythology.

Achelous may also refer to:

rivers

- Achelous River, a river in western Greece
- Achelous River (Arcadia), a river in Arcadia, Greece
- Achelous River (Thessaly), a river in Thessaly, Greece
- Aheloy (river), a river in southeastern Bulgaria, known in Antiquity and the Middle Ages as Achelous
- Peiros, a river in Achaea, Greece, known in Antiquity as Achelous

other uses

- Achelous (crab), a genus of crabs in the family Portunidae
- Achelous (crater), an impact crater on Ganymede
- Achelous-class repair ship, a class of ship built by the US Navy during World War II
- USS Achelous (ARL-1), a 1942 repair ship

== See also ==
- Acheloos (disambiguation)
