= Paracheloïtae =

Paracheloïtae or Paracheloitas (ancient Greek: Παραχελωίτας) may refer to:

- Paracheloïtae (Aetolia)
- Paracheloïtae (Thessaly)
