= Paeanium =

Coordinates: 38°26′14″N 21°16′39″E

Paeanium or Paianion (Ancient Greek: Παιάνιον) was a town in ancient Aetolia, near the Achelous River, a little south of Ithoria, and north of Oeniadae, which was on the other side of the river. It was only 7 stadia in circumference, and was destroyed by Philip V of Macedon in 219 BCE. Paeanium was perhaps rebuilt, and may be the same town as Phana (φάνα), which was taken by the Achaeans, and which we learn from the narrative in Pausanias was near the sea. Stephanus of Byzantium mentions Phana as a town of Italy; but for Πόλις Ἰταλίας ('city of Italy'), we ought probably to read Πόλις Αἰτωλίας ('city of Aetolia').

Its site is located near the modern Mastro.
