= Nesos =

Nesos may refer to:

- Mount Nesos, a mountain of the Antarctic
- Nesos (Greece), a town of ancient Acarnania, Greece
