= Machatas (sculptor) =

Machatas (Ancient Greek: Μαχάτας) was a sculptor, whose name is known by two inscriptions in Acarnania (Anaktorio) from which it appears that he made a statue of Hercules, which was dedicated by one Laphanes, son of Lasthenes. He is also mentioned in the second inscription as the maker of a statue dedicated to Asclepius.
