= Konopina =

Village in Aetolia-Acarnania, Greece

Coordinates: 38.755611°N 21.126889°E

Konopina (Greek: Κωνωπίνα) is a village and a community in the Medeon municipal unit, Aetolia-Acarnania, Greece. It is surrounded by the villages of Katouna, Kompotí, Aetos and Papadatou.

== Konopina Cave ==
In the center of the village is the Konopina Cave. It was discovered by chance in 1982, during the process of excavating the foundations of a house. The following year, the first expedition was carried out by a group of speleologists under the direction of Anna Petrocheilou. Two more scientific expeditions followed several years later in 1991 and 1993. In their reports, they state that it is a cave with amazing decoration. In particular, the speleologist S. Kirdis states that the cave is of great scientific interest.
