= Coronta =

Coordinates: 38°35′23″N 21°09′34″E

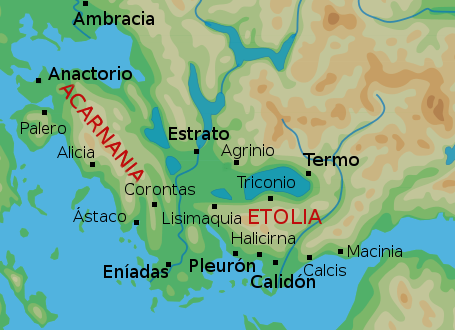
Map of ancient Acarnania and Aetolia showing Coronta, spelt "Corontas".

Coronta (Ancient Greek: τὰ Κόροντα or Κόρονται), a small town in the interior of Acarnania, probably lying between Metropolis and Old Oenia. It is cited by Thucydides in the context of the Peloponnesian War where it is said that, after the Battle of Naupactus in 429 BCE, the Athenians made an expedition through Acarnania in which they restored the leader of Corontas, and expelled from the city some inhabitants who were contrary to their interests.

It was located midway between Astakos and Stratos. At a mile (1.6 km) from Pródhromo (Πρόδρομος), William Martin Leake discovered on an insulated hill the ruins of Hellenic walls, which are probably the remains of Coronta.

Its site is located near the modern Khrysovitsa.
