= Drymos, Aetolia-Acarnania =

Coordinates: 38°52′53″N 21°01′08″E

Drymos, Aetolia-Acarnania is a settlement located in the municipality of Aktio-Vonitsa, roughly between the cities of Amfilochia and Vonitsa. It is near the ancient town of Drymus. Recent archaeological excavations have uncovered an early Christian basilica on the outer perimeter of the settlement.
