= Old Oenia =

Old Oenia or Old Oinia (Ancient Greek: ἡ παλαιὰ Οἰναία, romanized: he palaia Oinaia) was a town of ancient Acarnania, mentioned by Strabo in contradistinction to New Oenia, which was the town of Oeniadae. Its precise location is not known, but it was located between Oeniadae and Stratus.
