= Anaktorio =

Anaktorio Ανακτόριο
- Municipal unit
- Location within the regional unit

- Location within Greece
- Coordinates: 38°55′N 20°53′E
- Country: Greece
- Administrative region: West Greece
- Regional unit: Aetolia-Acarnania
- Municipality: Aktio-Vonitsa

Area
  - Municipal unit: 241.1 km^{2} (93.1 sq mi)

Population (2021)
  - Municipal unit: 7,534
  - Municipal unit density: 31.25/km^{2} (80.93/sq mi)
- Time zone: UTC+2 (EET)
  - Summer (DST): UTC+3 (EEST)
- Postal code: 300 02
- Area code: 26430

Anaktorio (Greek: Ανακτόριο) is a former municipality in Aetolia-Acarnania, West Greece, Greece. Since the 2011 local government reform it is part of the municipality Aktio-Vonitsa, of which it is a municipal unit. The municipal unit has an area of 214.112 km^{2}. The municipal unit is mainly flat and has a total population of 7,534 residents according to the 2021 census, more than half of which are found in the town of Vonitsa.The municipality was named after the ancient city of Anactorium.

== Subdivisions ==
The municipal unit Anaktorio is subdivided into the following communities (constituent villages in brackets):

- Vonitsa (Vonitsa, Aktio(Actium), Nea Kamarina)
- Agios Nikolaos Vonitsis
- Drymos (Drymos, Petra)
- Thyrio (Thyrio, Gourgouvli)
- Monastiraki (Monastiraki, Korpi)
- Paliampela
