= Asopius =

Ancient Greeks related to the Peloponnesian War

Asopius (Ancient Greek: Ἀσώπιος) was the name of several men of Ancient Greece related to the 5th-century BCE Athenian general Phormio, and the events of the Peloponnesian War:

- Asopius, the father of Phormio. The geographer Pausanias wrote that this man's name was "Asopichus" instead of "Asopius". Nothing further is known of him.
- Asopius, the son of Phormio, and grandson of the above. This Asopius was, at the request of the Acarnanians who wanted someone from Phormio's family to be in the command, sent by the Athenians in the year following his father's naval victories, in 428 BCE (that is, the 4th year of the Peloponnesian War), with 30 ships to Laconia and thereafter to Naupactus. Asopius then sent 18 ships back to Athens, and continued on to raze Oeniadae with his remaining fleet, though the people of that city remained unbowed. Very shortly afterwards, he landed his ground forces on the Leucadian coast and attacked the city of Nericus. In retreat from that assault, Asopius and most of his forces were cut off by a numerically superior force of Leucadians and some coast guards, and were killed.
