= Echinus =

Echinus may refer to:

- Echinus (Acarnania), a town in ancient Acarnania, Greece
- Echinus (Thessaly), a town in ancient Thessaly, Greece; also a Roman Catholic titular bishopric
- Echinus (molding), a molding similar to the ovolo
- Echinus (echinoderm), a genus of animals
- Echinus (plant), a synonym for the plant genus Mallotus
