= Astacus (Acarnania) =

Coordinates: 38°33′17″N 21°05′29″E

Astacus or Astakos (Ancient Greek: Ἄστακος) was a town on the west coast of ancient Acarnania, on a bay, one side of which is formed by the promontory anciently named Crithote. Astacus is said to have been a colony of Cephallenia. At the commencement of the Peloponnesian War, it was governed by a tyrant, named Evarchus, who was deposed by the Athenians in 431 BCE, but was shortly afterwards restored by the Corinthians. It is mentioned as one of the towns of Acarnania in a Greek inscription, the date of which is subsequent to 219 BCE.

Its site is located near the modern Astakos.
