= Charadra (Epirus) =

Coordinates: 39°12′25″N 20°52′38″E

Charadra (Ancient Greek: Χαράδρα), also Charadrus or Charadros (Χάραδρος), was a town of ancient Epirus, situated on the road from Ambracus to the strait of Actium. It is also mentioned in a fragment of Ennius: "Mytilenae est pecten Charadrumque apud Ambraciai."

Charadra is located near the Kastri at Palaia Philippias.

== See also ==
- List of cities in ancient Epirus
