= Loutraki, Aetolia-Akarnania =

Seaside settlement in Greece

Coordinates: 38°52′11″N 21°04′23″E

Loutraki is a seaside settlement in the Aktio-Vonitsa Municipality of the regional unit of Aetolia-Acarnania, Greece. It has a very small resident population as most house owners are from the nearby village of Katouna, and use the area as their summer or seasonal residence, linked to the seasonal cultivation of olives, or earlier in the century of tobacco crops.

Loutraki has an anchorage on the Amvrakikos Gulf and was also the site of a water mill in the past. It is mentioned by a few European travellers of the 18th and 19th centuries. Lord Byron mentions it under the name Utraikee (he must have misheard the name) and states that in 1809-1810 it was the site of a barracks and a customs house. Loutraki is the site of an ancient plane tree which contains a shrine to Agios Spyridon in its hollow.
