= Medeon =

Medeon Μεδεών
- Municipal unit
- Location within the regional unit

- Location within Greece
- Coordinates: 38°47′N 21°7′E
- Country: Greece
- Administrative region: West Greece
- Regional unit: Aetolia-Acarnania
- Municipality: Aktio-Vonitsa

Area
  - Municipal unit: 213.2 km^{2} (82.3 sq mi)

Population (2021)
  - Municipal unit: 3,311
  - Municipal unit density: 15.53/km^{2} (40.22/sq mi)
- Time zone: UTC+2 (EET)
  - Summer (DST): UTC+3 (EEST)

Medeon (Greek: Μεδεών) is a former municipality in Aetolia-Acarnania, West Greece, Greece. Since the 2011 local government reform, it has been part of the municipality of Aktio-Vonitsa, of which it is a municipal unit. The municipal unit has an area of 213.217 km^{2}. Its population was 3,311 (2021). The seat of the municipality was in Katouna. Medeon was named after the nearby ancient city of Medeon.

== Subdivisions ==
The municipal unit Medeon is subdivided into the following communities (constituent villages in brackets):

- Katouna (Katouna, Agios Nikolaos, Loutraki)
- Aetos
- Achyra
- Kompoti
- Konopina
- Tryfos
