= Oeniadae =

Town in ancient Acarnania

Coordinates: 38°24′28″N 21°11′48″E

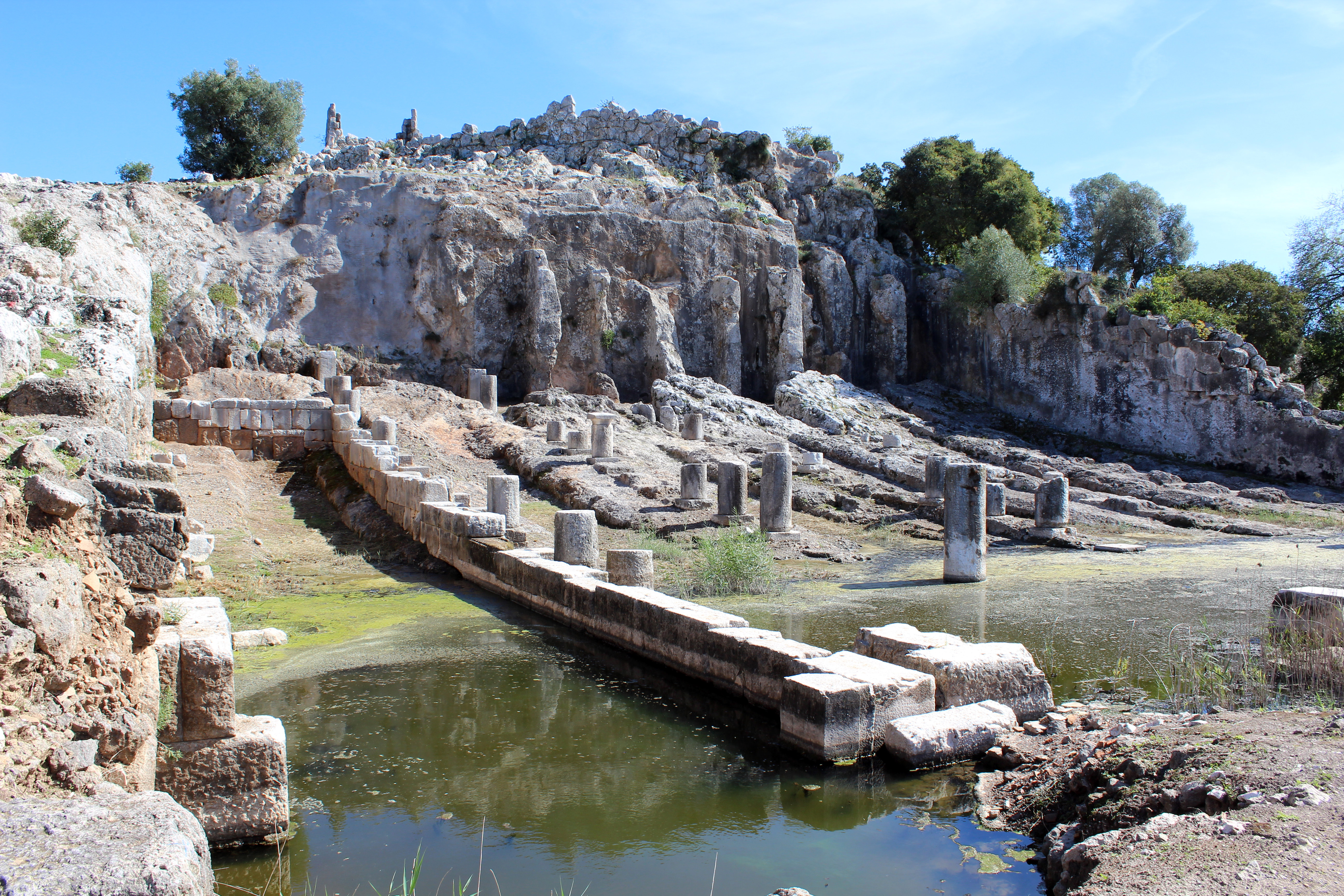
Remains of the ancient shipsheds at Oeniadae

Oeniadae or Oiniadai (Ancient Greek: Οἰνιάδαι), or Oeneiadae or Oineiadai (Οἰνειάδαι), was a town in ancient Acarnania, situated on the west bank of the Achelous River, about 10 miles (16 km) from its mouth. It was one of the most important of the Acarnanian towns, being strongly fortified both by nature and by art, and commanding the whole of the south of Acarnania. It was surrounded by marshes, many of them of great extent and depth, which rendered it quite inaccessible in the winter to an invading force. Its territory appears to have extended on both sides of the Achelous, and to have consisted of the district called Paracheloitis, which was very fertile. It seems to have derived its name from the mythical Oeneus, the great Aetolian hero.

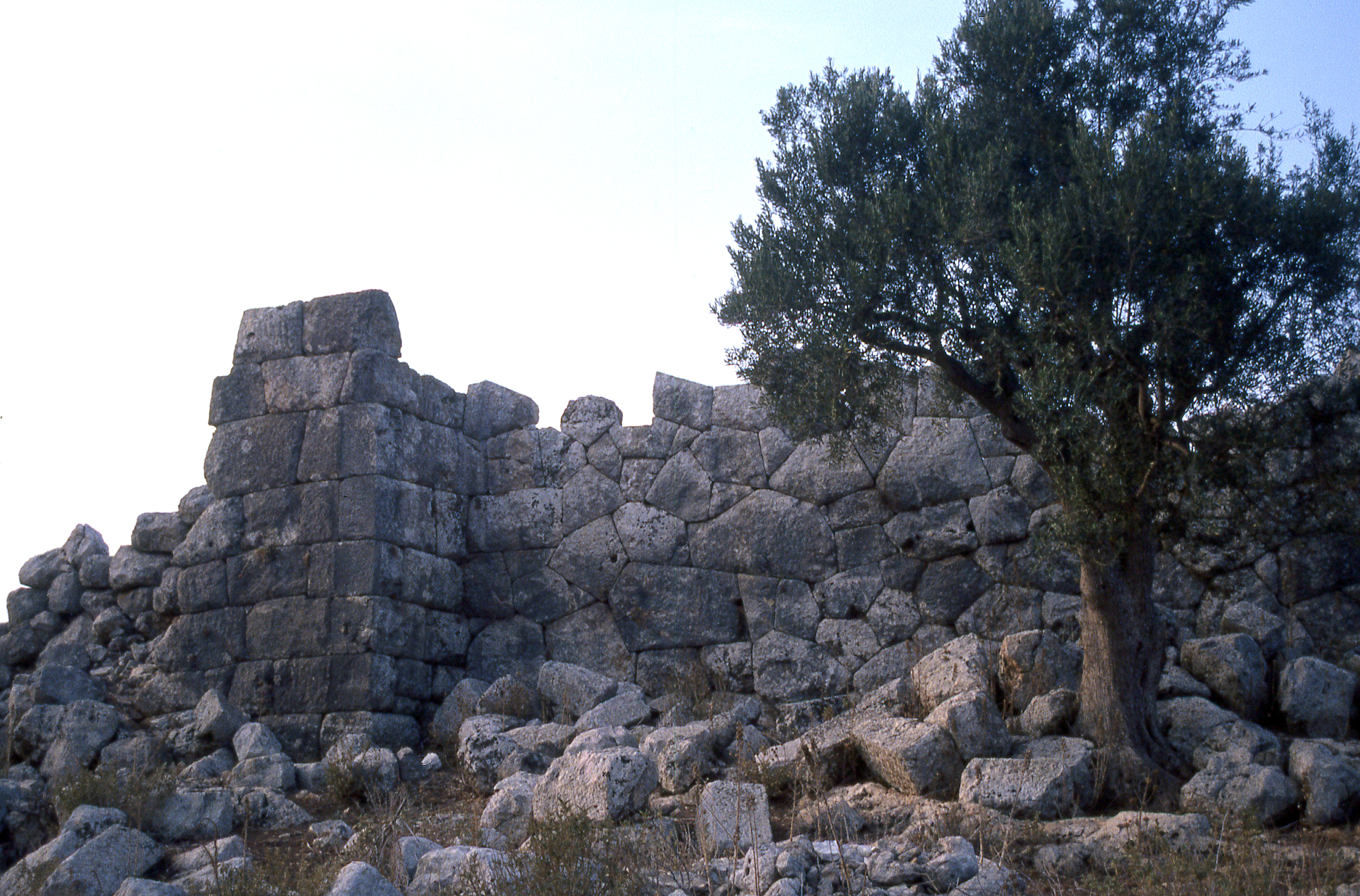
Fortifications of the harbor

The town is first mentioned about 455 BCE. The Messenians, who had been settled at Naupactus by the Athenians at the end of the Third Messenian War, shortly afterwards made an expedition against Oeniadae, which they took; but after holding it for a year, they were attacked by the Acarnanians and compelled to abandon the town. Oeniadae is represented at that time as an enemy of Athens, which is said to have been one of the reasons that induced the Messenians to attack the place. Twenty-three years before the Peloponnesian War (454 BCE) Pericles laid siege to the town, but was unable to take it. In the Peloponnesian War, Oeniadae still continued opposed to the Athenians, and was the only Acarnanian town, with the exception of Astacus, which sided with the Lacedaemonians. In the third year of the war (429 BCE) Phormion made an expedition into Acarnania to secure the Athenian ascendancy; but though he took Astacus, he did not continue to march against Oeniadae, because it was the winter, at which season the marshes secured the town from all attack. In the following year (428 BCE) his son Asopius sailed up the Achelous, and ravaged the territory of Oeniadae; but it was not till 424 BCE that Demosthenes, assisted by all the other Acarnanians, compelled the town to join the Athenian alliance.

It continued to be a place of great importance during the Macedonian and Roman wars. In the time of Alexander the Great, the Aetolians, who had extended their dominions on the west bank of the Achelous, succeeded in obtaining possession of Oeniadae, and expelled its inhabitants in so cruel a manner that they were threatened with the vengeance of Alexander. Oeniadae remained in the hands of the Aetolians till 219 BCE, when it was taken by Philip V of Macedonia. This monarch, aware of the importance of the place, strongly fortified the citadel, and commenced uniting the harbour and the arsenal with the citadel by means of walls. In 211 BCE Oeniadae, together with the adjacent Nesus (Νῆσος) or Nasus, was taken by the Romans, under Marcus Valerius Laevinus, and given to the Aetolians, who were then their allies; but in 189 BCE it was restored to the Acarnanians by virtue of one of the conditions of the peace made between the Romans and Aetolians in that year. From this period Oeniadae disappears from history; but it continued to exist in the time of Strabo.

Its site is near the modern Trikardo.
