= Echinus (Acarnania) =

Epirus in antiquity

Echinus or Echinos (Greek: Εχῖνος) was an ancient Greek town of Acarnania. Legend has it that it was founded by a Greek mythological figure named Echinus. It is mentioned by the poet Rhianus, and appears in the list of cities of Acarnania transmitted by Pliny the Elder, who places it between Heraclea and Actium. The site of Echinus is near the modern town of Vonitsa, probably the kastro (or castle) of Profitis Elias.

== See also ==
- List of cities in ancient Epirus

== Sources ==
- Hansen, Mogens Herman; Nielsen, Thomas Heine (2004). An Inventory of Archaic and Classical Poleis. Oxford and New York: Oxford University Press. ISBN 0198140991.
- Perlman, Paula Jean (2000). City and Sanctuary in Ancient Greece: The Theorodokia in the Peloponnese. Gottingen: Vandenhoeck & Ruprecht. ISBN 3-525-25218-8.
