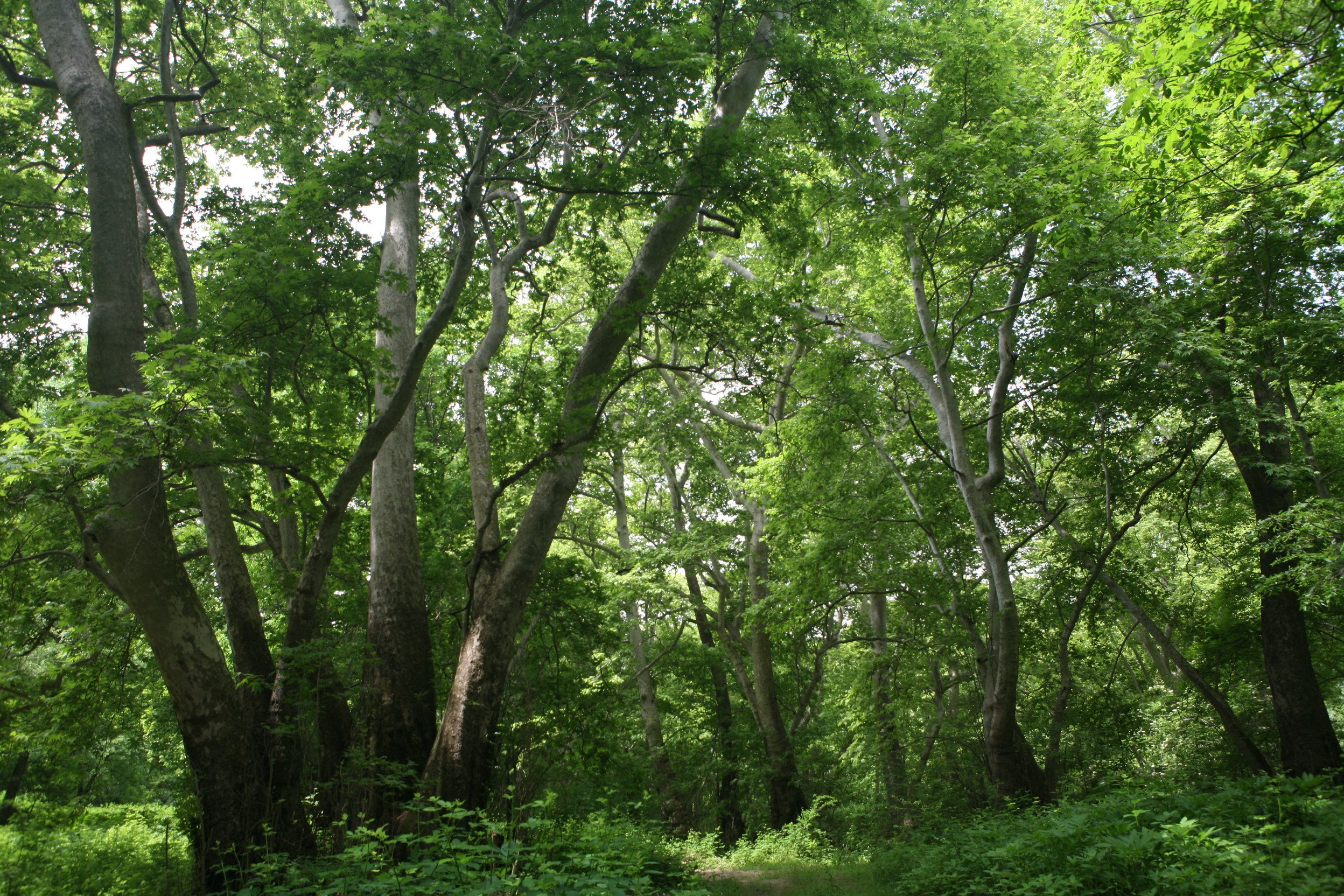
- Natural forest of Platanus orientalis in Armenia

Conservation status
- Data Deficient (IUCN 3.1)

Scientific classification
- Kingdom: Plantae
- Clade: Tracheophytes
- Clade: Angiosperms
- Clade: Eudicots
- Order: Proteales
- Family: Platanaceae
- Genus: Platanus
- Species: P. orientalis

Binomial name
- Platanus orientalis L.
- Distribution map

= Platanus orientalis =

Species of tree

Platanus orientalis, the Oriental plane, or chinar or booni (also boin), is a large, deciduous tree in the family Platanaceae, native from the eastern Mediterranean to Iran. It typically grows along rivers, streams and springs, and has broad spreading crown, exfoliating bark, deeply lobed leaves and pendent infructescences bearing spherical fruiting heads. It can grow to 30 m (98 ft) or more, and in autumn, its deep green leaves may change to blood red, amber, or yellow. Long cultivated for shade and ornament, extensive planting since antiquity has made precise limits of its original range difficult to determine.

== Etymology ==
The generic name Platanus comes from Ancient Greek πλάτανος (plátanos), meaning "plane tree". The word is recorded as a later form of πλατάνιστος (platánistos). The species name orientalis means 'eastern' (in comparison, the 'western' plane, or American sycamore, the only other species known to Linnaeus, is named Platanus occidentalis). It is also well known in Asia from Anatolia to India, where usually called chinar or chenar. It is known as booni (also bouin) in Kashmiri language.

== Distribution and Habitat ==
The species' native distribution ranges from Italy in the east— through the Balkans, Turkey, and the Caucasus— to Iran in the west. The true extent of the species' native range is difficult to determine as it has been widely planted since antiquity.

== Description ==
The oriental plane is found naturally in riverine settings, together with such trees as alder, willow and poplar. However, it is quite capable of survival and success in dry soils once it is established. The species is can be long-lived and grow to enormous sizes, with many trees being hundreds of years old. Around ten trees are known from the past and present with a diameter of 4 m (13 ft) or more, with several specimens around 100 m^{3} (3,500 cu ft) in total volume. A specimen in Ghirmizi Bazar, Karabakh, Republic of Azerbaijan is said to have a DBH of 5 m (16.4 ft), with a girth of 15.71 m (51.54 ft).

Like other plane trees, its leaves are borne alternately on the stem, deeply lobed, and palmate or maple-like. It usually has flaking bark, occasionally not flaking and becoming thick and rugged. Flowers and fruit are round and burr-like, borne in clusters of between two and six on a stem. Considerable variation exists among trees in the wild, and this may be complicated by crossbreeding with planted London planes (Platanus × hispanica), the hybrid of P. orientalis with the American sycamore (Platanus occidentalis).

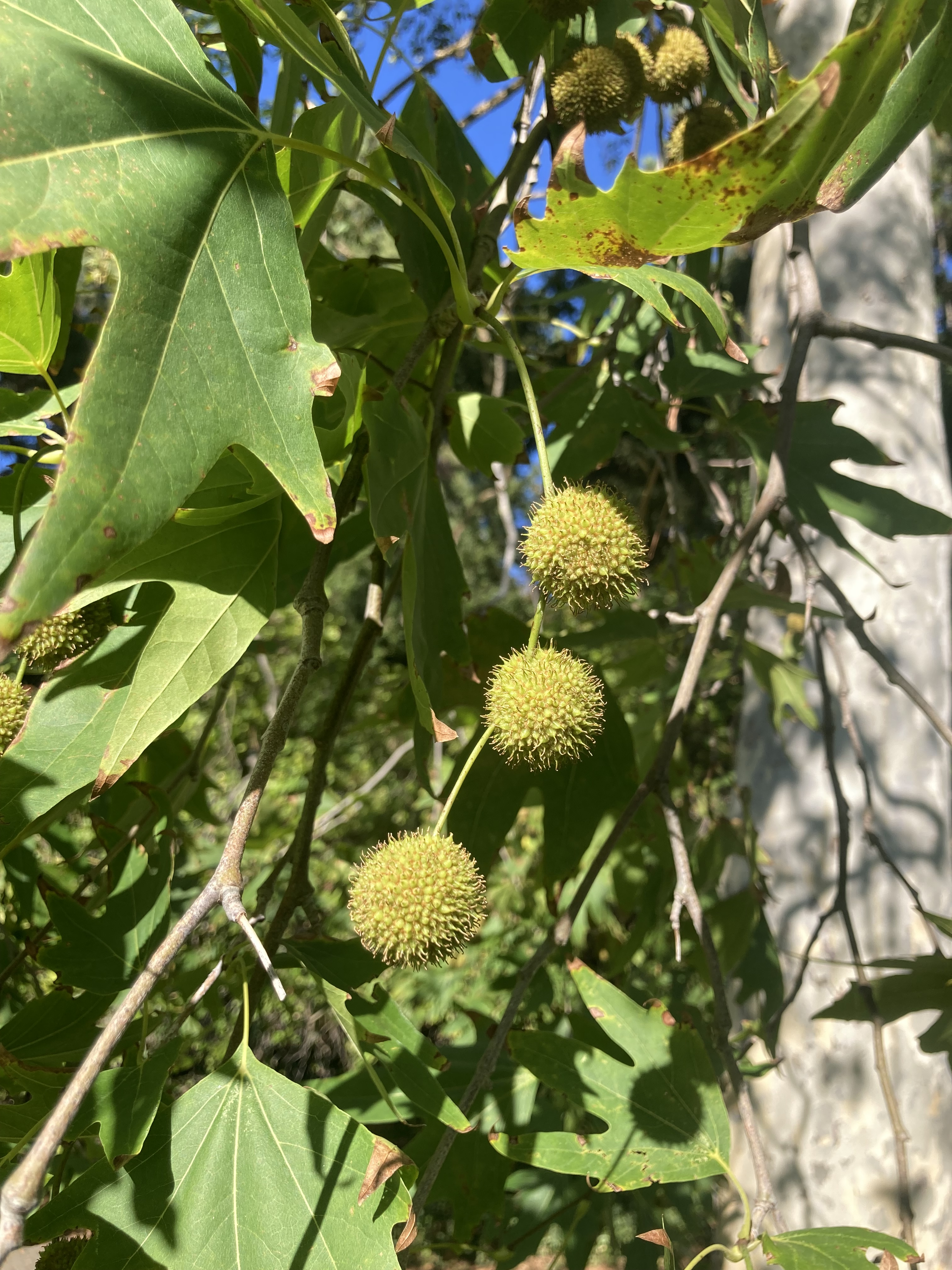
Developing infructescence with three fruiting heads borne along a pendent axis

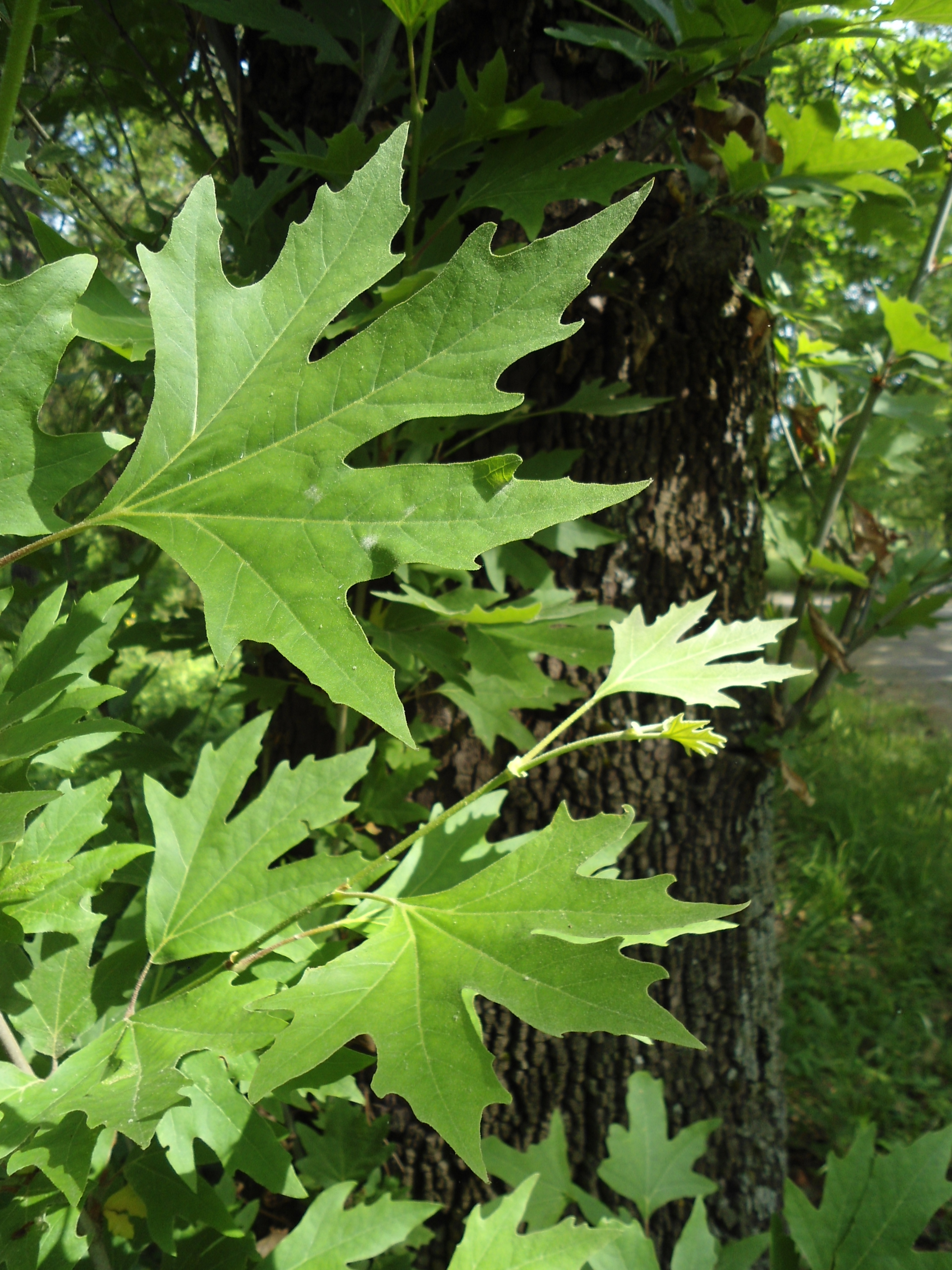
The leaves showing palmate silhouette and deep sinuses.

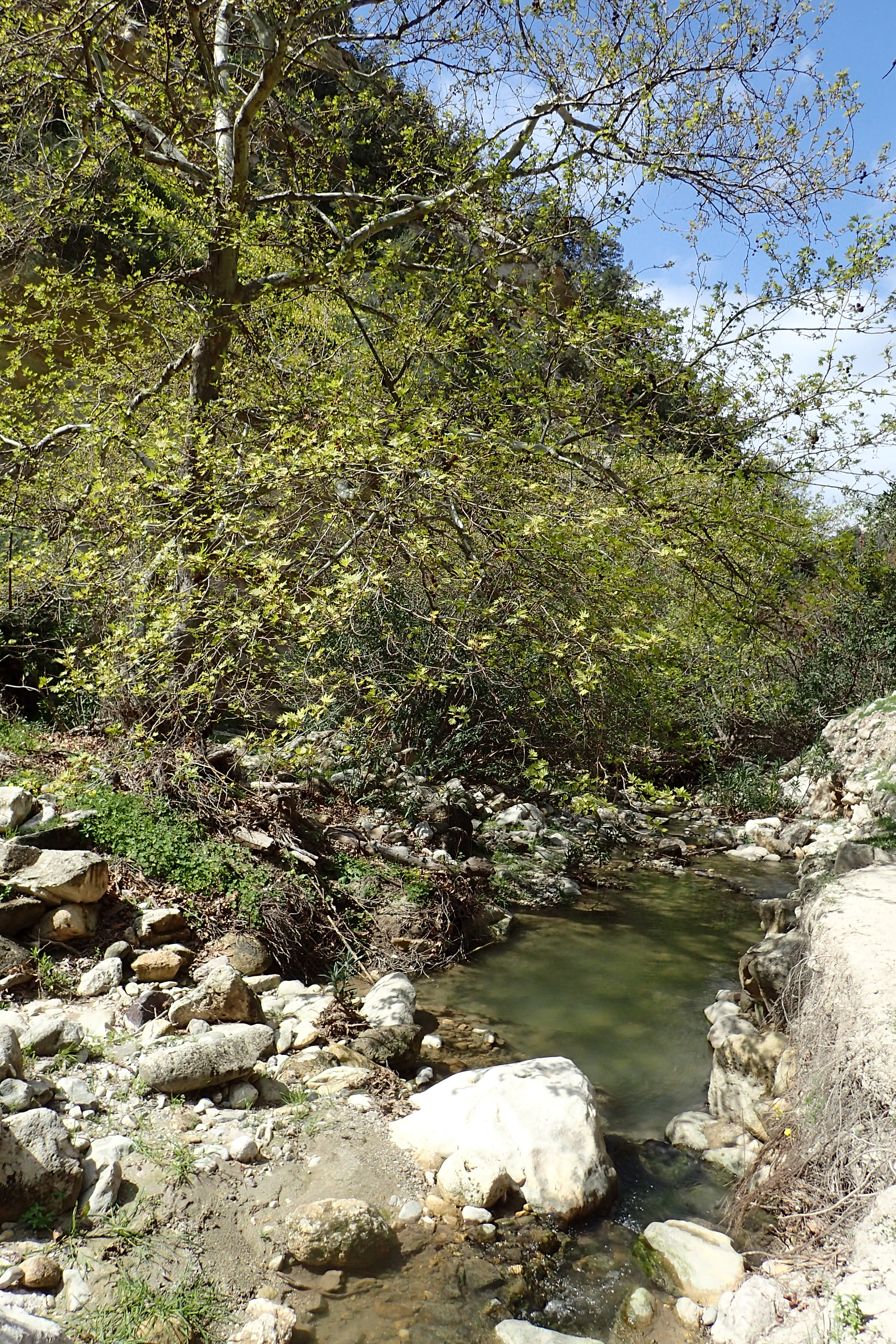
A wild tree in Greece

== Cultivation ==
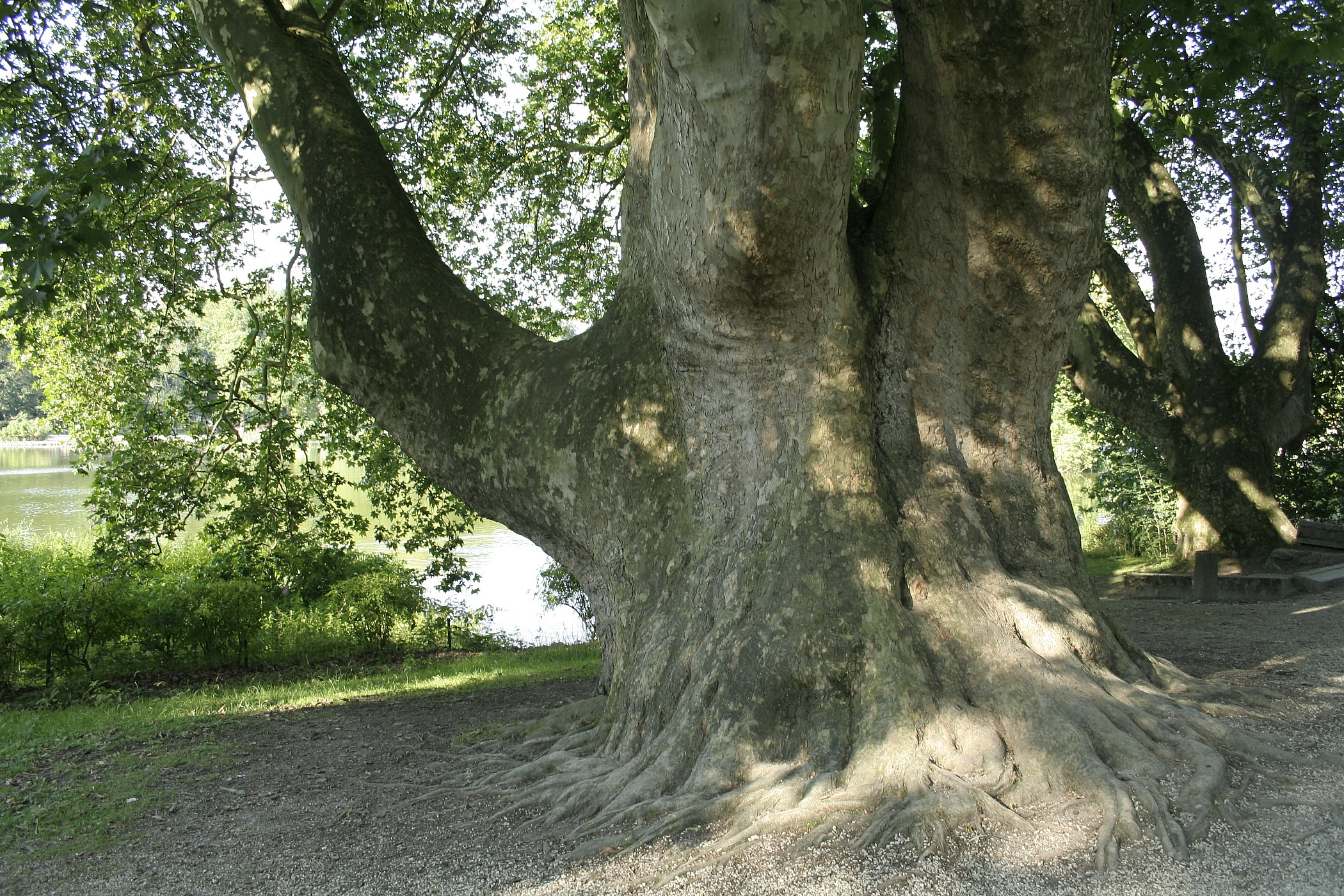
Older cultivated specimens can grow to an immense size

The tree can be cultivated in most temperate latitudes, though it benefits greatly from warm summers. As a very large and wide tree with broad, thick leaves that tend to orient horizontally, it is especially prized for the shade and coolness it provides during the hot season.

It grows best in rich soil in a sunny location and can survive drought well, although young plants appreciate regular watering.

== Other uses ==
The leaves and bark have been used medicinally. A fabric dye has been made from the twigs and roots. The timber, often called lacewood, is figured and valuable for indoor furniture. The leaves are also often used by artists for leaf carving.

== Cultural history ==
=== Iran ===
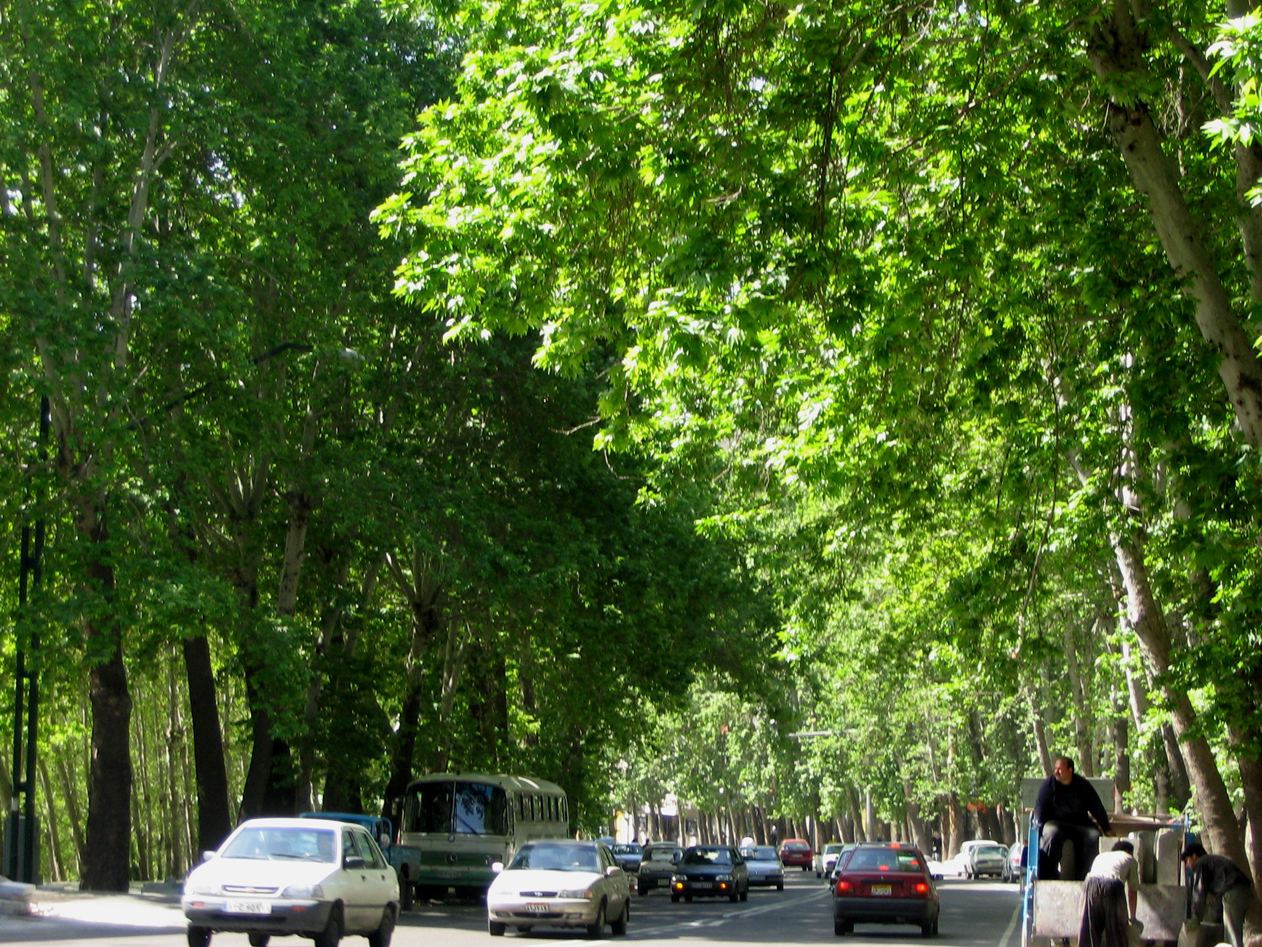
Around 18,000 plane trees had been planted in Valiasr Street, Tehran.

Many plane trees in Iran are of historical importance and have been designated as cultural heritage. One such example is the plane tree of Osku, estimated to be 1,200 years old. The capital Tehran used to be famous for its numerous oriental plane trees. Platanus orientalis is still one of the main ornamental trees in Tehran.

=== Greece ===
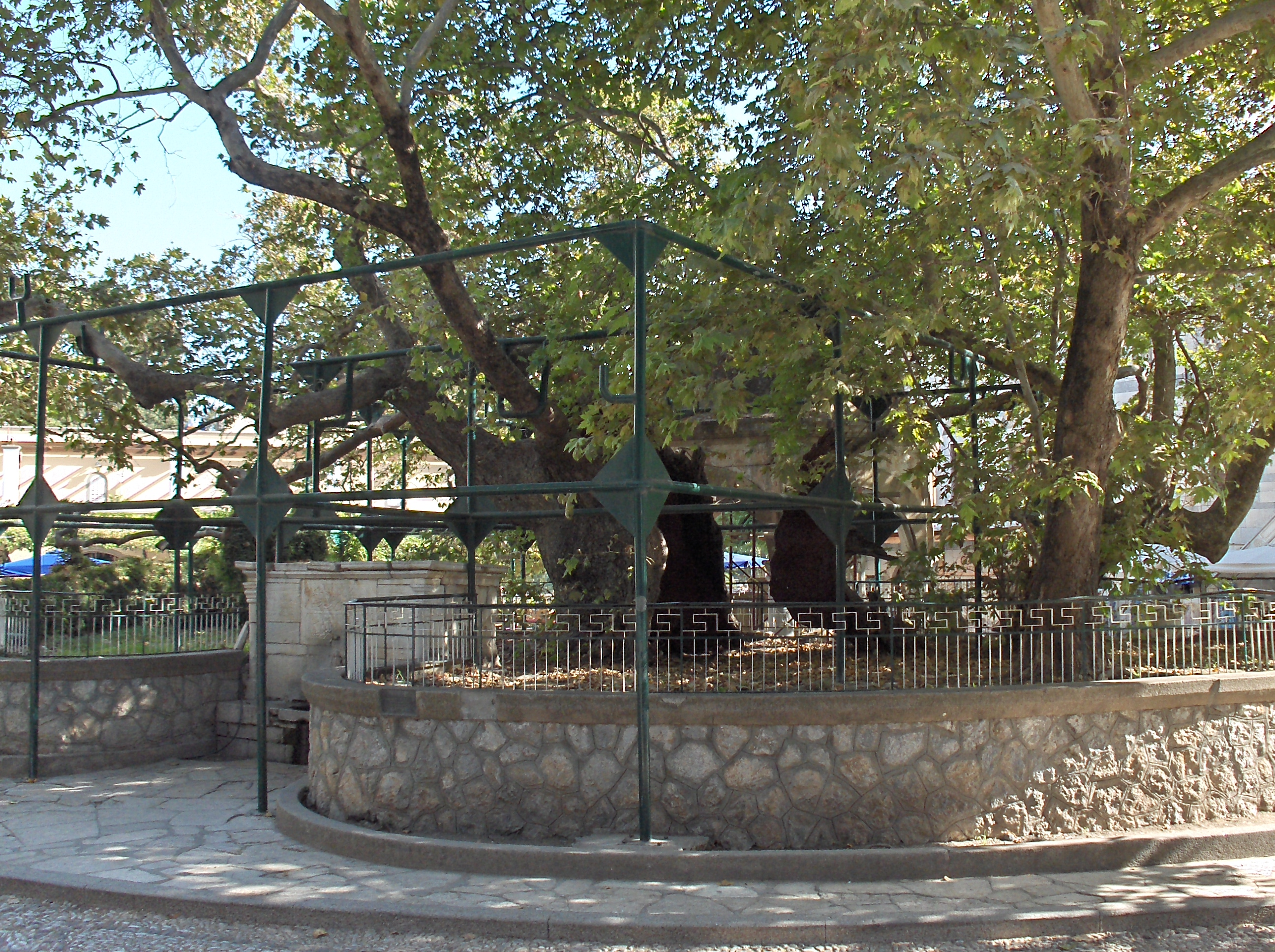
The "Tree of Hippocrates" in Kos, Greece, possibly a descendant of the original

The Tree of Hippocrates, under which Hippocrates—the "Father of Medicine"—taught at Kos, is reputed to have been an oriental plane. A 500-year-old tree presently there may be on the same site and may have been planted from a succession of cuttings from the original. The Athenian Academy, outside Athens, featured a sacred grove of planes where the students listened to the masters and where, among others, the Peripatetics practised philosophy.

Many villages in Greece feature plane trees in their main squares, frequently found alongside them are water springs that in the past would serve as the main water source for the villagers; usually these are quite old trees with their age seen as a point of pride for the local inhabitants. Occasionally, the oldest trees exhibit partially hollowed-out trunks, with cavities large enough to provide amusement opportunities for local or visiting children and teenagers, and even, in one occasion, to serve (along with the rest of the tree) as a tourist attraction, or at least, in one occasion, as a shrine.

=== Rome ===
Pliny's Natural History records the westward progress of the plane "introduced among us from a foreign clime for nothing but its shade", planted first at the tomb of Diomedes on the island of Tremiti, then imported to Greek Sicily by Dionysius the Elder (c. 432–367 BC), tyrant of Syracuse. He had plane-trees conveyed to the city of Rhegium (Reggio di Calabria), where they were looked upon as the great marvel of his palace, according to Pliny's sources. From there, it spread by the first century AD as far as the lands of the Morini in Belgic Gaul. Regardless of why it may have been introduced, the tree had medicinal uses from early times. Pliny details 25 remedies using preparation from the bark, leaves and excrescences of the plane. Pliny prescribes it for burns, bites, stings, frostbite and infections.

Pliny goes on to describe some legendary plane trees. There was one on the grounds of the Athenian Academy, he says, that had roots 50 feet (15 m) long. Licinius Mucianus held a banquet for 19 in a hollow plane-tree of Lycia, and the emperor Caligula another for 15 plus servants in a tree house (nest) built in the branches of a plane-tree at Velletri.

=== India ===
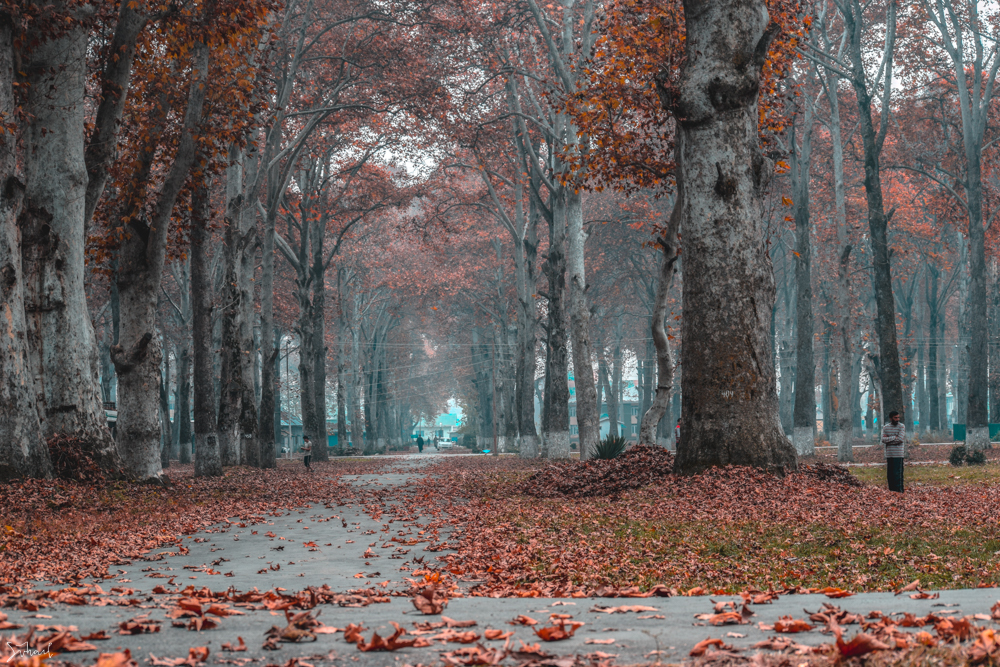
Chinars at the Kashmir University in Srinagar, Jammu and Kashmir during autumn

The chinar tree can be found throughout the landscape of the Kashmir Valley in the Indian western Himalayas, planted across hillsides and cities, and is seen as a symbol for the region, locally known as Būn' in Kashmiri and chinar in Hindustani. Excavations from the Burzahom archaeological site have revealed charcoal remains of the tree from the Neolithic period. While Kashmiri Muslims believe that the chinar was brought to Kashmir valley by Islamic preachers from Iran in 14th century CE, on the other hand, Kashmiri Hindus assert that the tree was traditionally planted near Hindu holy places in Kashmir and is associated with Hindu goddess Bhavani (Shiva's consort; see Kashmir Shaivism), from whom it derives its Kashmiri name bouin or booni.

After the advent of Muslim rule, especially under the Mughals, chinar became a major garden and landscape tree, and dominates many historic gardens. The tree known for its elegance and exuberance has remained an attraction for artists and litterateurs. One tree believed to be planted in 1374 CE at the Chattergam village by an Islamic mystic, Syed Abul Qaim Hamadani, who accompanied Mir Sayyid Ali Hamadani from Iran to Kashmir, is believed by many in Kashmir to be the world's oldest surviving chinar tree. Planting of chinar trees in Kashmir was greatly patronised by the Mughals, and later by Dogra rulers. Dogra Maharaja Hari Singh is believed to have gifted five chinar trees to Shimla, then summer capital of British India, in present-day Himachal Pradesh. These, and other chinars planted later in the hill station, have become part of the city's lore.

Chinar trees are being felled rapidly in Kashmir, although a ban was enacted in 2009 to curb cutting. Chinar trees are now required to be registered, considered a state property, and painted white at their base. Naseem Bagh, a Mughal garden near Srinagar with over 700 chinar trees has been developed as a Chinar Heritage Park by the University of Kashmir.

=== United Kingdom ===
In 2011, a specimen planted by Capability Brown at Corsham Court in Wiltshire was identified by The Tree Register of the British Isles as the tree with the greatest known spread in the United Kingdom.

An example dating to at least 1762 is one of Kew Gardens' thirteen 'Heritage Trees'.

The Pococke Garden at Christ Church, Oxford contains a specimen, known as The Pococke Tree, which is understood to have been planted by Edward Pococke from seed he collected in 1636 from Aleppo. With a girth of around 9 m (30 ft) it is the oldest in the UK.

== Cultural references ==
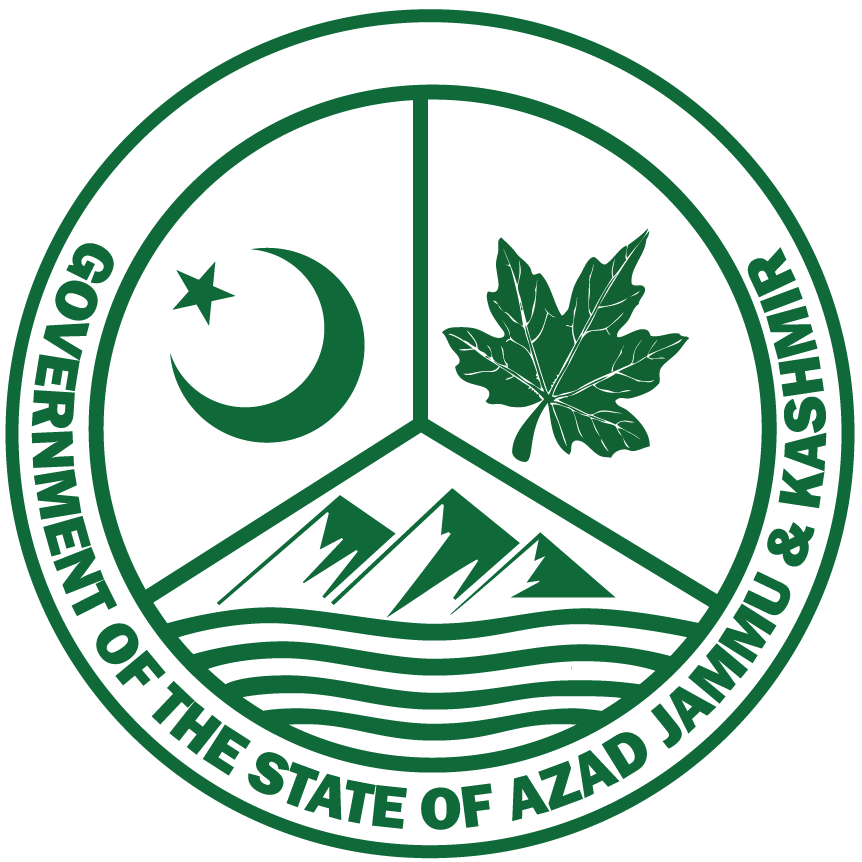
Seal of Jammu and Kashmir with a Plane tree leaf

A plane tree is the main theme in the aria Ombra mai fu composed by George Frideric Handel, in which the main character, Xerxes I of Persia, admires the shade of a plane tree.

It is the State tree of the Indian union territory of Jammu and Kashmir. During the 2010 Commonwealth Games opening ceremony, held in India, the chinar tree was featured prominently in the 'tree of knowledge' segment of the ceremony. The Chinar Corps of the Indian Army is also named after the tree, and the tree's leaf appears on the sign of the corps. Many universities, including the University of Azad Jammu and Kashmir, also include the symbol.

The Pococke Tree in the Pococke Garden at Christ Church is thought to be the inspiration for the Tumtum tree in Lewis Carol's poem Jabberwocky.
