= Alexander of Acarnania =

3rd-century BC Greek general

Alexander

Alexander of Acarnania (Ancient Greek: Άλέξανδρος) was once a friend of Philip V of Macedon but abandoned him, and insinuated himself so much into the favor of Antiochus III the Great, that he was admitted to his most secret deliberations.

== Greece invasion ==
Alexander advised Antiochus to invade Greece, holding out to him the most brilliant prospects of victory over the Romans. Antiochus followed his advice. Alexander was greatly injured in the Battle of Cynoscephalae in 194 BC in which Antiochus was defeated by the Romans, and in this state he carried the news of the defeat to his kin, who was staying at Thronium, on the Maliac Gulf. When the king, on his retreat from Greece, had reached Cenaeum in Euboea, Alexander died and was buried there, in 191.
