= Heraclea (Acarnania) =

Ancient Greek city

Coordinates: 38°54′00″N 20°56′09″E

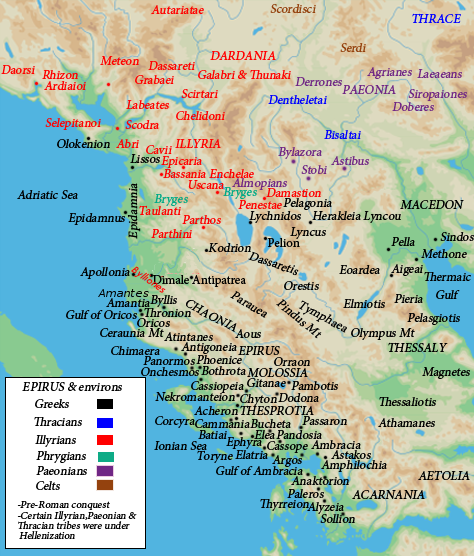
Acarnania in antiquity

Heraclea, Heracleia, or Herakleia (Greek: Ἡράκλεια or Ἑράκλεα) was an ancient Greek city located in the region of Acarnania. It was founded by Philip II of Macedon, father of Alexander the Great, in the 4th century BCE. It appears in the list of cities of Acarnania transmitted by Pliny the Elder, who places it near the city of Echinus. Stephanus of Byzantium also mentions the town in his Ethnica. Heraclea is tentatively located near modern Thesis Lekka.

== See also ==
- List of cities in ancient Epirus

== Sources ==
- Hansen, Mogens Herman; Nielsen, Thomas Heine (2004). An Inventory of Archaic and Classical Poleis. Oxford and New York: Oxford University Press. ISBN 0198140991.
