= Anapus (Acarnania) =

River in ancient Acarnania, Greece

The Anapus or Anapos (Ancient Greek: Ἄναπος) was a river in ancient Acarnania. It was a tributary of the Achelous River, which it joined eighty stadia south of Stratus.

The name was also applied to a river in Sicily (the modern Anapo).
