= Acheloos =

Acheloos (ancient Greek: Ἀχελῷος) may refer to:

- Achelous River, a major river in Greece
- Achelous River (disambiguation), other rivers of the name in Greece
- Achelous, a river deity in Greek mythology
- Acheloos (municipality), a municipal unit in the Karditsa regional unit, Greece

== See also ==
- Achelous (disambiguation)
