= Nericus =

Coordinates: 38°47′32″N 20°44′08″E

Nericus or Nerikos (Ancient Greek: Νήρικος), also known as Neritus or Neritos (Νήρῐτος), was a well-fortified town on the mainland of ancient Acarnania across from Leucas, mentioned by Homer in the Odyssey. In the middle of the seventh century BC, the Corinthians, under Cypselus, founded a new town near the isthmus, which they called Leucas, where they settled 1000 of their citizens, and to which they removed the inhabitants of Nericus. The town must still have existed down to a much later date, as it is mentioned by Thucydides in the context of the Peloponnesian War. Thucydides writes that in the year 428 BCE, Athenian troops and Acarnanians under Asopius landed at Nericus, but many Leucadians came to the aid of the town, and Asopius died during the retreat. In Ovid's Metamorphoses, Macareus, a companion to Odysseus on his voyages, was from Nericus; Macareus was transformed into a pig by Circe.

Its site is tentatively located near the Agios Georgios.
