= Asopichus =

Name list

Asopichus (Ancient Greek: Ἀσώπιχος; English translation: "related to the Asopus") was a male Greek name.

1. Asopichus of Orchomenus, son of Cleodamus and winner of the boy's foot race at the Ancient Olympic Games of 488 BCE.
2. Asopichus, or Asopius, father of the 5th-century BCE Athenian general Phormio.
3. Asopichus, Theban soldier who fought together with his lover the General Epaminondas at the Battle of Leuctra (371 BCE), where he greatly distinguished himself; he had the trophy of Leuctra represented in relief on his shield which was consecrated at Delphi, in the portico of the Temple of Apollo.
