= SS Ithaka =

Wrecked steam freighter and landmark in Canada

Coordinates: 58°46′9″N 93°53′21″W

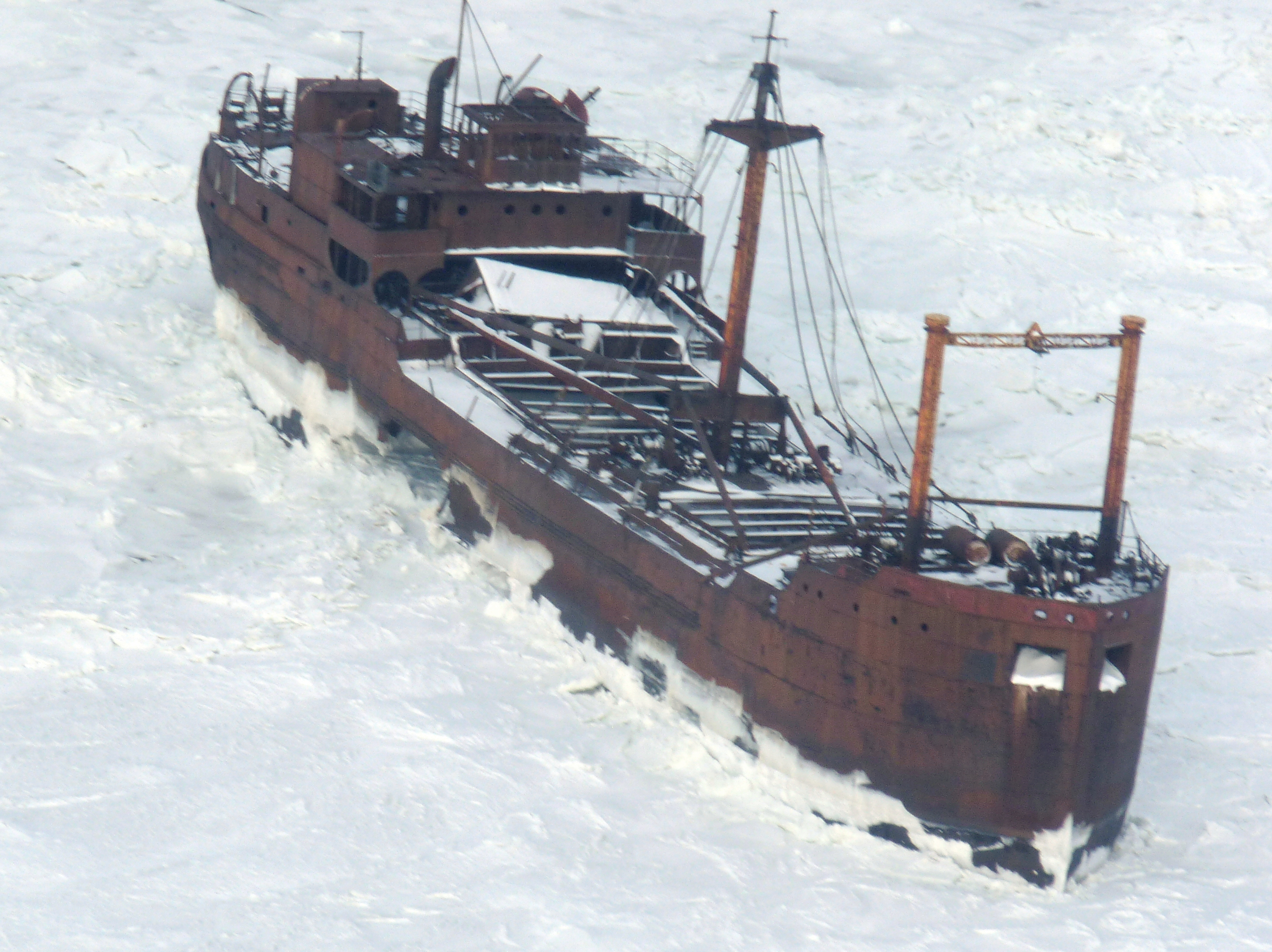
- Ithaka, aground near Churchill, Manitoba

History
- Name: Frank A. Augsbury (1922–27); Granby (1927–48); Parita 2 (1948–51); Valbruna (1951–52); Lawrencecliffe Hall (1952–1955); Federal Explorer (1955–60); Ithaka (1960)
- Owner: George Hall Coal & Shipping Corporation (1922–27); Canada Steamship Lines (1927–45); Ministry of Transport (1945–48); Cia Naviera Parita S.A. (1948–51); Lloyd Mediterraneo S.p.A. di Nav. (1951–52); Hall Corporation of Canada (1952–55); Federal Commerce & Navigation Company (1955–60); Ithaka Shipping Company (1960)
- Port of registry: Canada (1922–45); United Kingdom (1945–48); Panama (1948–51); Italy (1951–52); Canada (1952–60); (United Kingdom) Nassau, Bahamas (1960)
- Builder: Frazer, Brace Ltd, Trois-Rivières, Quebec
- Yard number: 19
- Launched: 21 October 1922
- Out of service: 14 September 1960
- Identification: Official number: 150820
- Fate: Wrecked on 14 September 1960
- Notes: The bridge was moved from the forecastle to its current position and the boilers converted from burning coal to oil some time before being wrecked

General characteristics
- Type: Lake freighter
- Tonnage: 2,051 GRT (as built); 1,986 GRT (after 1951); 2,057 GRT (after 1951)
- Length: 251 ft 2 in (76.6 m)
- Beam: 43 ft 1 in (13.1 m)
- Draught: 18 ft 1 in (5.5 m)
- Installed power: 2 × 13 ft (4.0 m)-diameter triple furnace Scotch marine boilers
- Propulsion: 1 × 3 cylinder Triple expansion steam engine 19x32x56-36 stroke; One shaft; Single screw
- Speed: 10 knots (19 km/h)
- Crew: 37

SS Ithaka is a wrecked steam freighter and landmark on the coast of Hudson Bay near Churchill, Manitoba. Originally built as the lake freighter Frank A. Augsbury for the Canadian George Hall Coal & Shipping Corporation in 1922, she went on to sail for a variety of different owners in different locations being renamed to Granby in 1927, Parita II in 1948, Valbruna in 1951, Lawrencecliffe Hall in 1952, Federal Explorer in 1955 and finally Ithaka in 1960, before being wrecked later that year.

== Career ==
She was built as the lake freighter Frank A. Augsbury for the George Hall Coal Company by Fraser, Brace, Ltd., of Trois-Rivières, Quebec and launched on 21 October 1922. Frank A. Augsbury was 2,051 GRT and 251 ft 2 in (76.6 m) by 43 ft 1 in (13.1 m) with draught of 18 ft 1 in (5.5 m) powered by a 1,400 horsepower (1,000 kW) triple expansion steam engine fired by two Scotch marine boilers burning coal. She was sold to Canada Steamship Lines in 1927 and renamed Granby. She was taken over by the Ministry of War Transport and managed during the Second World War by France, Fenwick and Company.

On 28 June 1945 Granby collided with the British MV Atlantic City off the West Goodwins, and was holed aft above the waterline. Granby was taken to the Downs, and on 2 July 1945 was towed to Gravesend by the tugboats Empire Larch and Empire Mary. On 3 August she left Gravesend under tow and was laid up in the River Blackwater. She was sold to the Panamanian firm Cia Naviera Parita S.A. in 1948 and renamed Parita II, sailing for them until 1951, when she was acquired by the Italian shipping company Lloyd Mediterraneo S.p.A. di Nav., and renamed Valbruna. In 1952 she was bought by the successor company of her original owners, now trading as the Hall Corporation of Canada, Ltd., and returned to Canada under the name Lawrencecliffe Hall. She was sold again in 1955, this time to the Federal Commerce & Navigation Co., Ltd, who renamed her Federal Explorer.

Federal Commerce and Navigation used her as a supply ship to communities on the Canadian Arctic seaboard, twice chartering her to the Clarke Steamship Company in 1956, and using her to open the Federal Intercoastal Line in 1957. The Federal Explorer, under her master, Captain Simon Bouchard, delivered parts for new nickel mill under construction in Rankin Inlet in 1956 and also delivered cargoes of fuel oil to Royal Canadian Air Force stations in the Arctic. In 1958 she carried nickel concentrates to Churchill, Manitoba for shipment by rail to Fort Saskatchewan, and then delivered a cargo of grain from Churchill to Montreal in late October.

== Final sale and wreck ==
Federal Explorer was sold for the final time to the Ithaka Shipping Company in 1960, and was registered in Nassau, Bahamas by her owner, a Greek named J. Glikis. She was chartered to the Clarke Steamship Company to deliver nickel concentrate from the works at Rankin Inlet, and sailed from Churchill on 10 September 1960 to collect her cargo, carrying supplies for the settlement. She was caught in a severe gale while making the voyage, losing her rudder. She dropped anchor, but the anchors failed to hold, and she ran aground in Bird Cove, about ten miles east of Churchill, on 14 September.

She had delivered her first shipment of 3,000 short tons (2,700 tonnes) of ore to Churchill, and had loaded a small amount of mining equipment and a building supplies, for a return trip, but she encountered a storm with 80-mile-per-hour (130-kilometre-per-hour) winds. The captain turned back to the safety of the port, but the weather was so bad that he decided to drop anchor. The anchor chain broke and her rudder was beaten off. Completely out of control the vessel was driven into Bird Cove, 12 or 15 kilometres (7.5 or 9.3 mi) from Churchill, Manitoba, running onto a shallow gravel-bank 750 metres (820 yd) off shore.

Her bottom was completely ripped out when the storm pounded her on the gravel bank. The insurers, Lloyd's of London, wrote off the vessel as a complete loss, but regarding the grounding as suspicious, refused to pay the insurance claim. All 37 crew members were rescued by the Canadian Coast Guard's CCGS William Alexander and were landed at Winnipeg, Manitoba on 18 September. The shallow water she grounded in meant that people could walk to the wreck at low tide, and her navigating instruments and much of her cargo, consisting of two generators and some plywood panels, as well as mission supplies, were salvaged.
