= Same (polis) =

Coordinates: 38°15′17″N 20°39′32″E

Epirus in antiquity

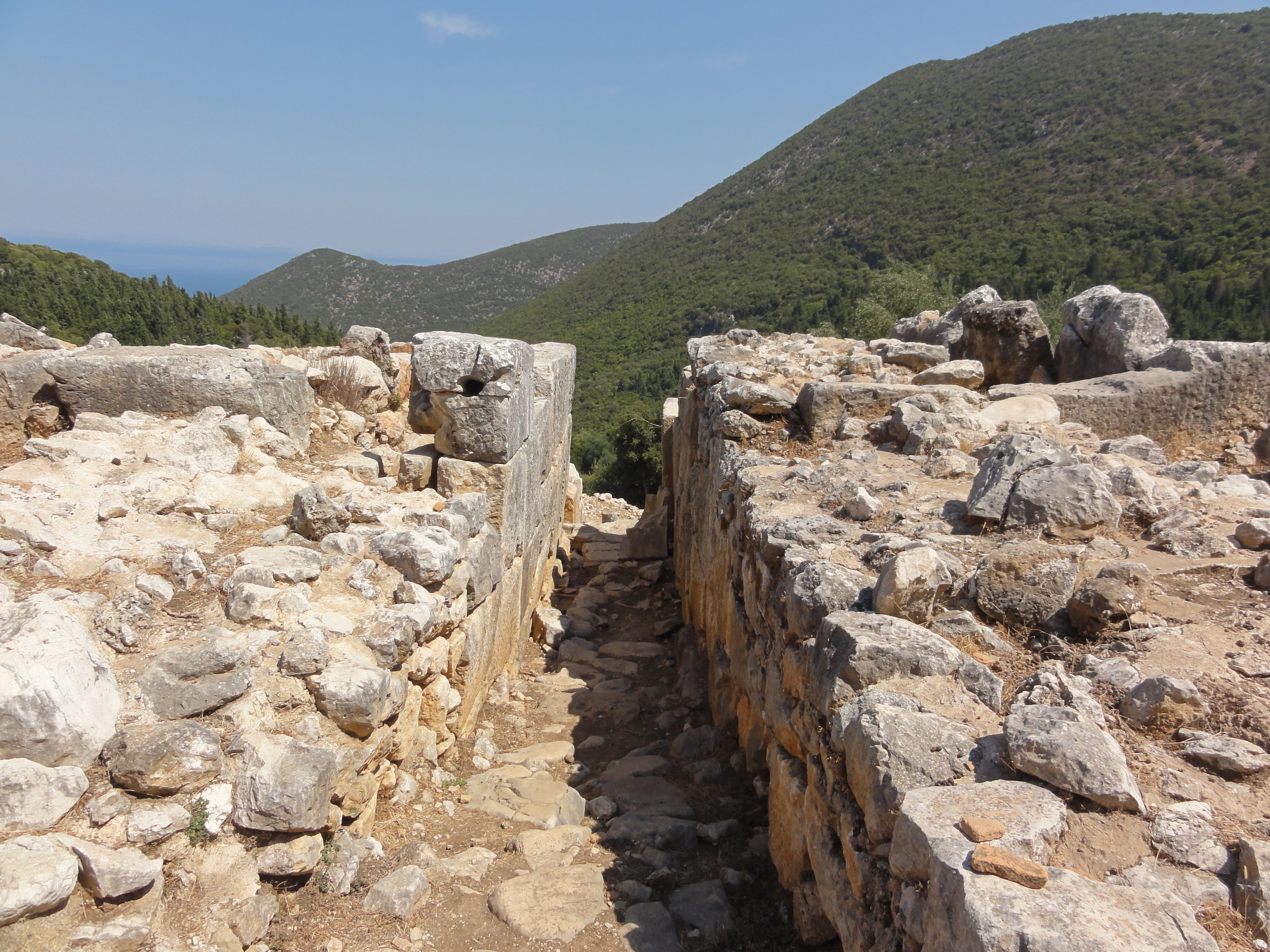
Ruins of Same

Same (Ancient Greek: Σάμη) was a Greek city in ancient Cephalonia, one of the four city-states which composed the Cephalonian Tetrapolis.

Same had strong fortification, of length 3.4 kilometers and a good natural harbor with a harbor mole for protection from the north wind and wave action of the Ithaca strait. The walls date chronologically to the period from the end of the 4th century BC until the end of the 3rd century BC.

During the Roman campaign against the Aetolians and their allies, the Roman consul Marcus Fulvius Nobilior captured the island of Cephallenia in 189 BC. Same was the only city that offered significant resistance. After a four-month siege, the Romans stormed and took the city.

== See also ==
- Cranii
- Pale
- Pronnoi
