= Ithaca Pottery Site =

- U.S. National Register of Historic Places
- Location: Address Restricted, Ithaca, New York
- Area: 0.3 acres (0.12 ha)
- Built: 1840
- Architect: Cornell, Ezra
- NRHP reference No.: 79001635
- Added to NRHP: July 17, 1979

Ithaca Pottery Site is an archaeological site located at Ithaca in Tompkins County, New York.

The site is the location of a pottery factory owned by Elijah Cornell active between 1825 and 1849.

It was listed on the National Register of Historic Places in 1979.
