= Sollium =

Ancient Greek town in Acarnania

Coordinates: 38°47′42″N 20°50′06″E

Sollium or Sollion (Ancient Greek: Σόλλιον), was a town on the coast of ancient Acarnania, on the Ionian Sea. It was in the neighbourhood of Palaerus, which lay between Leucas and Alyzia. William Martin Leake, however, placed it south of Alyzia, at Stravolimióna (i.e., Port Stravo). Sollium was a Corinthian colony, and as such was taken by the Athenians in the first year of the Peloponnesian War (431 BCE). The Athenians gave both the place and its territory to Palaerus. It is again mentioned in 426 BCE, as the place at which Demosthenes landed when he resolved to invade Aetolia.

Its site is located near the modern Pogonia.
