= Pale (Greece) =

Coordinates: 38°13′21″N 20°26′15″E

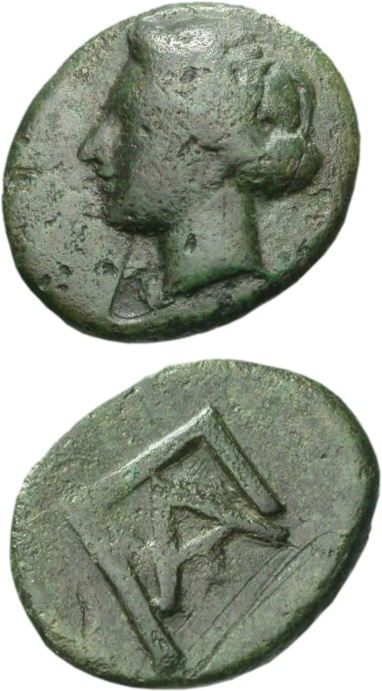
Coins from Pale.

Pale (Ancient Greek: Πάλη) or Paleis (Παλείς) or Παλαιέων πόλις was an ancient Greek city in ancient Cephalonia.

Two hundred of its citizens fought at the battle of Plataea against the Persians. Later, just before the commencement of the Peloponnesian War it sent four ships to the assistance of the Corinth against the Corcyra.

It joined the Athenian alliance, together with the other towns of the island, in 431 BC. At a later period Pale espoused the side of the Aetolians against the Achaeans, and was accordingly besieged by Philip, who would have taken the city but for the treachery of one of his own officers. Pale surrendered to the Romans without resistance and after the capture of Same by the Romans in that year, it became the chief town in the island. It was in existence in the time of Hadrian and in an inscription of that time is called ἐλευθέρα καὶ αὐτόνομος (independent and autonomous).

Coins minted in Pali present an unclothed Kefalos resting upon a stone, various ram imagery (partial or complete), and figures including Procris, Gorgo, or Demeter. The flip side features wheat, barley, dolphins, Pegasus, or the letters Π or ПΑ. Unlike the other city-states of the Cephalonian Tetrapolis, nautical symbols are prominent on the coins from Pale, which reveals that this settlement maintained deeper maritime ties than its counterparts.

According to Pherecydes, Pale was the Homeric Dulichium, this opinion was rejected by Strabo, but accepted by Pausanias.

Its site is located near the modern Lixouri.

== See also ==
- Cranii
- Pronnoi
- Same
