= Drymus (Acarnania) =

Coordinates: 38°52′50″N 21°00′39″E

Drymus or Drymos (Ancient Greek: Δρυμός) was a town in ancient Acarnania.

The site of Drymus is at Palioklissi (Palioklissia, Paliokklesi), 2 kilometres (1.2 mi) from the Ambracian coast. Remains of early Byzantine basilicas have been discovered, along with pottery, metalwork, and sculpture. Documentary evidence mention a 5th-century bishop.
