= Drymus (Attica) =

Drymus or Drymos (Ancient Greek: Δρυμός) was a fortress in ancient Attica.

The site of Drymus is unlocated but near the border of Boeotia.
