= Cape Skopia =

Headland in Acarnania, Greece

Coordinates: 38°30′05″N 21°01′55″E

Cape Skopia (Greek: Άκρα Σκοπιά - Ákra Skopiá, meaning "cape lookout"; anciently Ancient Greek: Κριθωτή - Krithotí, Latin: Crithote; also formerly Turkovekla and Tourkovígla) is a headland in Acarnania forming the northern arm of land enclosing the Bay of Astakos. It is southwest of Astakos. It was one of the few natural features of Acarnania that is mentioned in the writings of antiquity, along with the more famous cape of Actium.
