= Craneia =

Coordinates: 39°15′05″N 21°12′51″E

Craneia or Kraneia (Ancient Greek: Κράνεια) was a village of ancient Epirus, within the territory of Ambracia, situated on a mountain of the same name.

Its site is tentatively located near the modern Sykies (Palioavli).
