= Achelous River (Arcadia) =

River in Greece

The Achelous (Ancient Greek: Ἀχελῷος Akhelôios), also Acheloos, is a mountain torrent of ancient Arcadia, flowing into the Alpheus, from the north of Mount Lycaeus.
