= Cranii =

Human settlement in Greece

Coordinates: 38°10′23″N 20°29′15″E

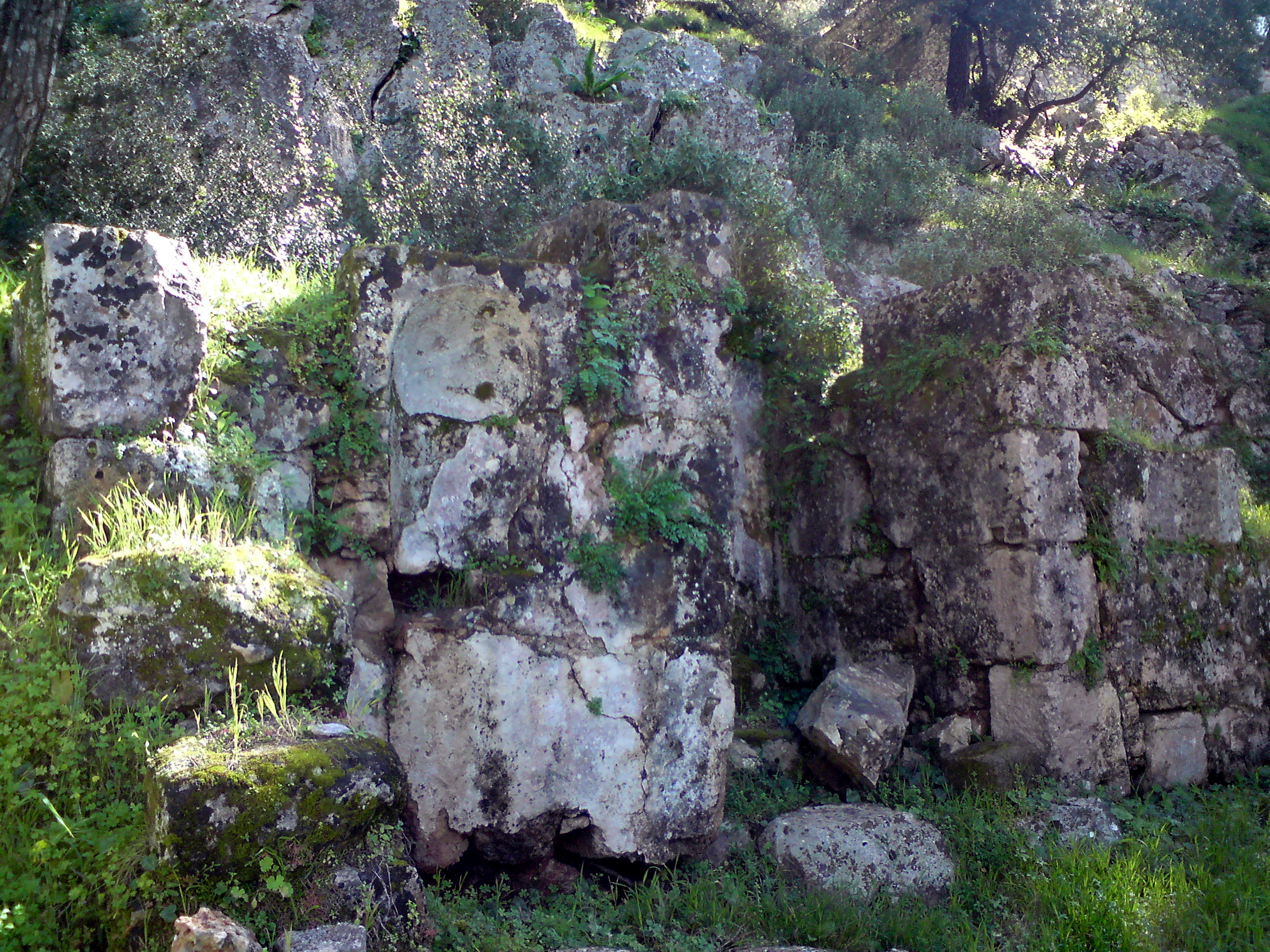
Remains of ancient Cranii

Cranii or Kranioi or Krane (Ancient Greek: Κράνιοι) was a Greek city on the island of Cephallenia, situated at the head of a bay on the western coast. It was one of the four city-states that existed in the island together with Pale, Pronnoi and Same. Cranii minted its own coins, and most of them depict the letters KRA with the head of a ram or the bust of Procris, or Kefalos, and on the other side they depict a helmet, or a bow, or the leg of a ram. Thucydides writes extensively about Cranii in his History of the Peloponnesian War. In 431 BCE, it joined the Athenian alliance, together with the other Cephallenian towns; in consequence of which the Corinthians made a descent upon the territory of Cranii, but were repulsed with loss. In 421 BCE the Athenians settled at Cranii helot deserters of Sparta and the Messenians who were withdrawn from Pylos on the surrender of that fortress to the Lacedaemonians. As part of the negotiations with Sparta after the "50 Years Truce" was signed, these people were moved from their garrison at Pylos where they were involved in a blockade of the troops on the island in the bay of Pylos. They were relieved by Athenian troops who then garrisoned the bay. Cranii surrendered to the Romans without resistance in 189 BCE. It is mentioned both by Strabo and Pliny the Elder.

Its ruins are located near Argostoli. William Martin Leake, who visited in the 19th century, remarks that "the walls of Cranii are among the best extant specimens of the military architecture of the Greeks, and a curious example of their attention to strength of position in preference to other conveniences; for nothing can be more rugged or forbidding than the greater part of the site. The enclosure, which was of a quadrilateral form, and little, if at all, less than three miles (5 km) in circumference, followed the crests of several rocky summits, surrounding an elevated hollow which falls to the south-western extremity of the gulf of Argostóli." The walls may be traced in nearly their whole circumference.

== See also ==
- Pale
- Pronnoi
- Same
