= Achelous River (Thessaly) =

River in Greece

The Achelous (Ancient Greek: Ἀχελῷος Akhelôios), also Acheloos, is a river of the district of Malis in ancient Thessaly, flowing past the town of Paracheloïtae, and near Lamia; a tributary of the Spercheios.
