= Metropolis (Acarnania) =

Coordinates: 38°35′28″N 21°13′48″E

Metropolis (Ancient Greek: Μητρόπολις) was a town in the interior of ancient Acarnania, south of Stratus, and on the road from the latter place to Conope in Aetolia. At a later time it fell into the hands of the Aetolians, but was taken and burned by Philip V of Macedon in his expedition against the Aetolians, 219 BCE. It is mentioned as one of the towns of Acarnania, in a Greek inscription found at Actium, the date of which is probably prior to the time of Augustus.

Its site is located near the modern Rigani.
