= Thyrium =

Ancient Greek city in Acarnania

Coordinates: 38°51′07″N 20°59′14″E

Epirus in antiquity

Thyrium or Thyrion (Ancient Greek: Θύριον), or Thyreum or Thyreon (Θύρεον), or Thurium or Thourion (Θούριον), or Thyrreium or Thyrreion (Θύρρειον), was a city in ancient Acarnania. Cicero tells us that in sailing from Alyzia to Leucas, he touched at Thyrium, where he remained two hours; and from this statement, as well as from the history of the events in which Thyrium is mentioned, we may infer that it was situated on or near the Ionian Sea, and that it was the first town on the coast south of the channel which separated Leucas from the mainland.

Thyrium is first mentioned in 373 BCE, when its territory was invaded by Iphicrates. Xenophon describes it as a place of importance; and it appears as one of the chief cities of Acarnania at the time of the Roman wars in Greece, when its name frequently occurs. When Acarnania allied itself with Philip V of Macedon against Rome in 200 BCE, although it lost Leucas because of this, and the city of Thyrreion was anointed as its new capital. At this period Thyrium was one of the places at which the meetings of the Acarnanian League were usually held. It was one of the many towns whose ruin was occasioned by the foundation of Nicopolis to which its inhabitants were removed by order of Augustus.

Its site is located near the modern Thyrio (formerly Ag. Vasilios), near Vonitsa.

== See also ==
- List of ancient Greek cities
