= Pronnoi =

Town of Cephallenia

Coordinates: 38°08′45″N 20°46′36″E

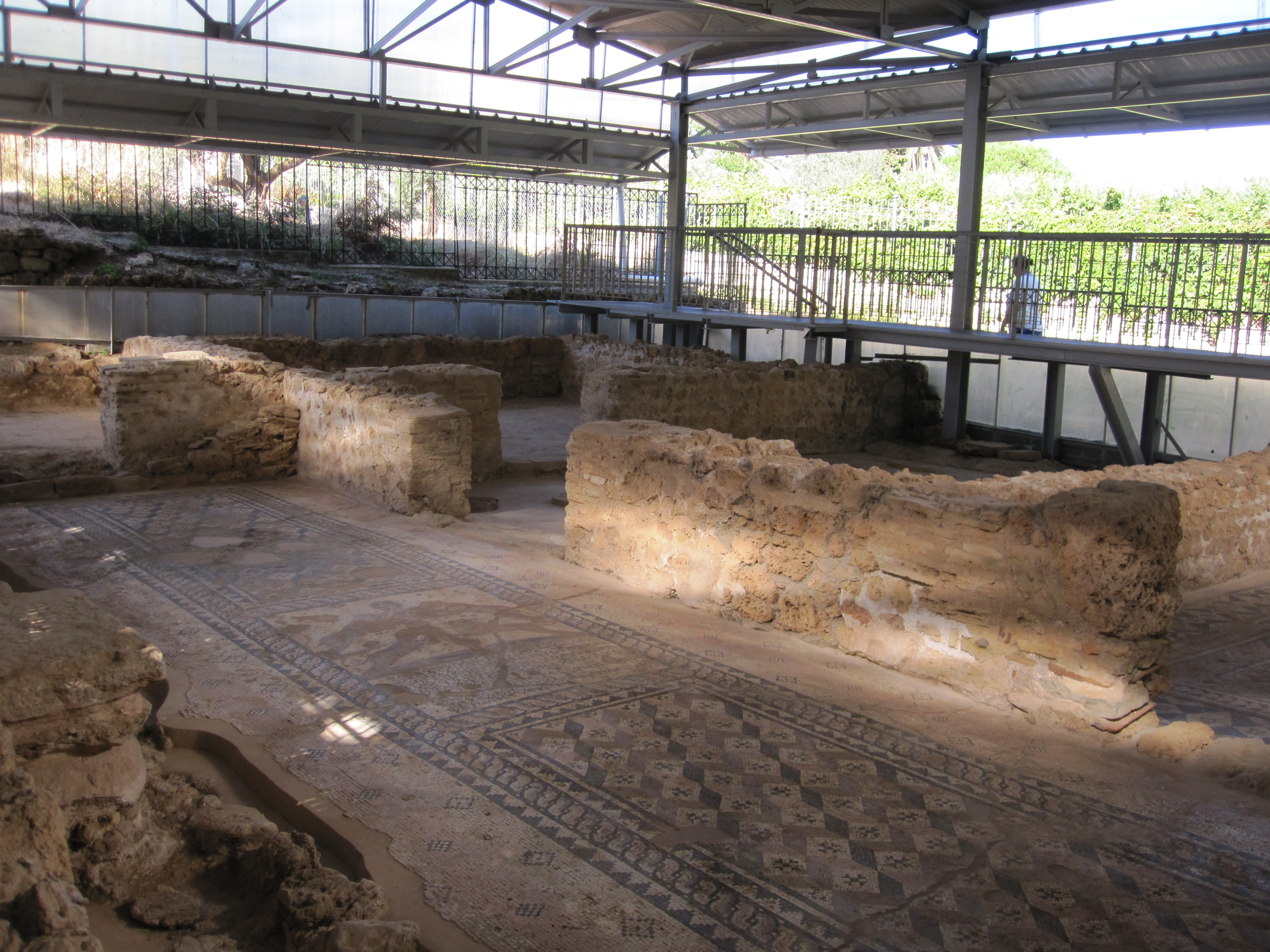
Remains of a Roman villa at Pronnoi.

Pronnoi (Ancient Greek: Πρόννοι), also known as Pronesus or Pronesos (Πρωνῆσος), was one of the four towns of Cephallenia, situated upon the southeastern coast. Together with the other towns of Cephallenia it joined the Athenian alliance in 431 BCE. It is described by Polybius as a small fortress; but it was so difficult to besiege that Philip V of Macedon did not venture to attack it, but sailed against Pale. Livy, in his account of the surrender of Cephallenia to the Romans in 189 BCE, speaks of the Nesiotae, Cranii, Palenses, and Samaei. Now as we know that Pronnoi was one of the four towns of Cephallenia, it is probable that Nesiotae is a false reading for Pronesiotae, which would be the ethnic form of Pronesus, the name of the town in Strabo. Pronnoi or Pronesus was one of the three towns which continued to exist in the island after the destruction of Same.

Its site is located near Poros, Cephalonia.

== See also ==
- Cranii
- Pale
- Same
