= Paracheloïtae (Thessaly) =

Paracheloïtae or Paracheloitai or Paracheloitas (Greek: Παραχελωίτας - meaning "near the Achelous") was a town in the district of Phthiotis in ancient Thessaly.

Strabo places it in the district of Phthiotis, and says it was near Lamia and had the same name as a city of Aetolia. It was on the banks of a river called the Achelous, evidently a name also transplanted from Aetolia.

The site of Paracheloïtae in unlocated.
