= Paracheloïtae (Aetolia) =

Paracheloïtae or Paracheloitai or Paracheloitas (Greek: Παραχελωίτας - meaning "near the Achelous") was a town in ancient Aetolia. The town, near the Achelous River, gave name to the fertile plain adjoining it: Paracheloïtis (Παραχελωῖτις). Apparently, this was older than the town of the same name in Thessaly, as Strabo relates that there, too was a river named Acheolous with giving name to a town.

Although the Paracheloïtis is located as the lower flood plain of the modern Achelous River, the site of a town is not given.
