= Ithaca (polis) =

Settlement in Ancient Greece

Coordinates: 38°26′31″N 20°38′18″E

Epirus in antiquity

Ithaca, Ithake, or Ithaka (Ancient Greek: Ἰθάκη) was a Greek city on ancient Ithaca.

== See also ==
- List of cities in ancient Epirus
