= Nesus =

Town of ancient Greece

Coordinates: 38°21′38″N 21°11′56″E

Nesus or Nasus or Nesos or Nasos (Ancient Greek: Νῆσος) was a town in ancient Acarnania.

Its site is located near modern Portes on Skoupas.
