= Ambracus =

Coordinates: 39°02′28″N 20°57′11″E

Ambracus or Ambrakos (Ancient Greek: Ἄμβρακος) was a town in ancient Epirus, and the port of Ambracia. It is described by Polybius as a place well fortified by ramparts and outworks, and as surrounded by marshes, through which there was only one narrow causeway leading to the place. It was taken by Philip V of Macedon, in 219 BCE, as a preliminary to an attack upon Ambracia. The Periplus of Pseudo-Scylax probably alludes to this place, when it says that Ambracia had a fortress near its harbour; for near the western shore of the old mouth of the river Arachthus some ruins have been discovered, whose topographical situation accords with the description of Polybius. They are situated on a swampy island, in a marshy lake near the sea. They enclosed an area of about a quarter of a mile in extent, and appeared to be merely a military post, which was all that the swampy nature of the ground would admit of. This fortress commanded the harbour, which is described by the Periplus and by Dicaearchus as a κλειστὸς λιμήν, or a port with a narrow entrance, which might be shut with a chain. The harbour must have been an artificial one; possibly obstructed by swamps and shoals as scarcely to be accessible even to boats. In ancient times its navigation was esteemed dangerous, whence Lucan speaks of "orae malignos Ambraciae portus."

Its site is located near the modern Phidokastro, Arta.
