= Katouna =

Katouna Κατούνα
- Community
- Location within Greece
- Coordinates: 38°47′06″N 21°06′54″E
- Country: Greece
- Administrative region: West Greece
- Regional unit: Aetolia-Acarnania
- Municipality: Aktio-Vonitsa
- Municipal unit: Medeon

Population (2021)
  - Community: 1,634
- Time zone: UTC+2 (EET)
  - Summer (DST): UTC+3 (EEST)

Katouna is a settlement in the regional unit of Aetolia-Acarnania, Greece. Its population at the 2021 census was 1,634. It has a large number of shops, cafes, a bank and school and so serves as the central settlement for the surrounding region. Between 1836 and 1912 it was the seat of the municipality Echinos. In 1912 it became an independent community, which was elevated to a municipality in 1986. In 1997 it was merged into the new municipality Medeon, of which it was the seat. In 2010 it was merged into the new Aktio-Vonitsa municipality. Residents until recently were cultivating tobacco.

== History ==
The current settlement lies close to the ancient city of Medeon, the birthplace of Philip of Acarnania, Alexander the Great's doctor. Katouna was a stop in Lord Byron's travels (1809-1810). He describes it as a well-built, large village, inhabited solely by Greeks, and also mentions a school house.
