= Ithoria =

Coordinates: 38°29′19″N 21°17′13″E

Ithoria (Ancient Greek: Ἰθωρία) was a town of ancient Aetolia, near the Achelous River, and a short distance south of Conope. It was situated at the entrance of a pass, and was strongly fortified both by nature and by art. It was taken by Philip V of Macedon and levelled to the ground in 219 BCE.

Its site is located near the modern Agios Ilias.
