= Palairos =

Palairos Πάλαιρος
- Municipal unit
- Location within the regional unit

- Location within Greece
- Coordinates: 38°48′N 20°53′E
- Country: Greece
- Administrative region: West Greece
- Regional unit: Aetolia-Acarnania
- Municipality: Aktio-Vonitsa

Area
  - Municipal unit: 205.8 km^{2} (79.5 sq mi)
- Elevation: 23 m (75 ft)

Population (2021)
  - Municipal unit: 3,799
  - Municipal unit density: 18.46/km^{2} (47.81/sq mi)
  - Community: 2,029
- Time zone: UTC+2 (EET)
  - Summer (DST): UTC+3 (EEST)

Palairos (Greek: Πάλαιρος) is an ancient city and a modern town in Aetolia-Acarnania, Greece. The modern village is also known locally by the name of Zaverda (Ζαβέρδα), in official use till 1928. Since the 2011 local government reform Palairos is part of the municipality Aktio-Vonitsa, of which it is a municipal unit. The municipal unit has an area of 205.843 km^{2}. The municipal unit was formed as the independent municipality Kekropia in 1994 from the former communities Palairos and Pogonia, and was expanded with the former communities Vatos, Plagia and Peratia as a part of the 1997 Kapodistrias reform. The name of the municipal unit was changed to Palairos in 2004.

== History ==
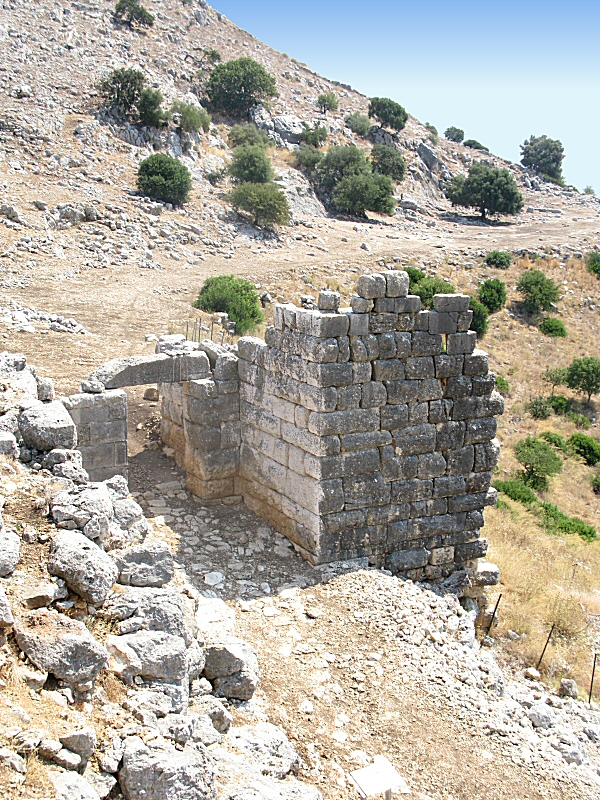

Palairos (Ancient Greek: Παλαιρός, Latin: Palaerus) was a city of ancient Greece, situated in the southern part of the region of Epirus. The city, ruinous for centuries, is thought to have existed during the Mycenean period, since parts of the city walls appear to date back to 2000 B.C. The construction of the walls interchanges between the square-shaped and the polygonal system and the parts belong to different periods. It lies high in the mountains overlooking the Ionian Sea and Lake Vourkaria. The city is thought to have had a population of over 10,000 people.

Epirus in antiquity

During antiquity it was part of Acarnania, according to the Theodorokoi, situated on the west coast, on the Ionian Sea, which is placed by Strabo between Leucas and Alyzia. In the first year of the Peloponnesian War (431 BCE) Palairos was in alliance with the Athenians; and when the latter people took the neighbouring town of Sollium, which was a Corinthian colony, they gave both it and its territory to the inhabitants of Palaerus.

At nearby Actium, Mark Antony and Cleopatra were defeated in the Battle of Actium by Octavius. According to tradition, the salt lake was the saviour of Cleopatra, who hid her ships there.

The citadel on the eastern part of the yard is separated by a partition and is considered to be the most ancient part of the wall, probably from the Mycenean period. The ruins are close to the present-day town of Palairos.

== See also ==
- List of cities in ancient Epirus
