= Vonitsa =

Town in Acarnania, Greece

Vonitsa Βόνιτσα
- Community
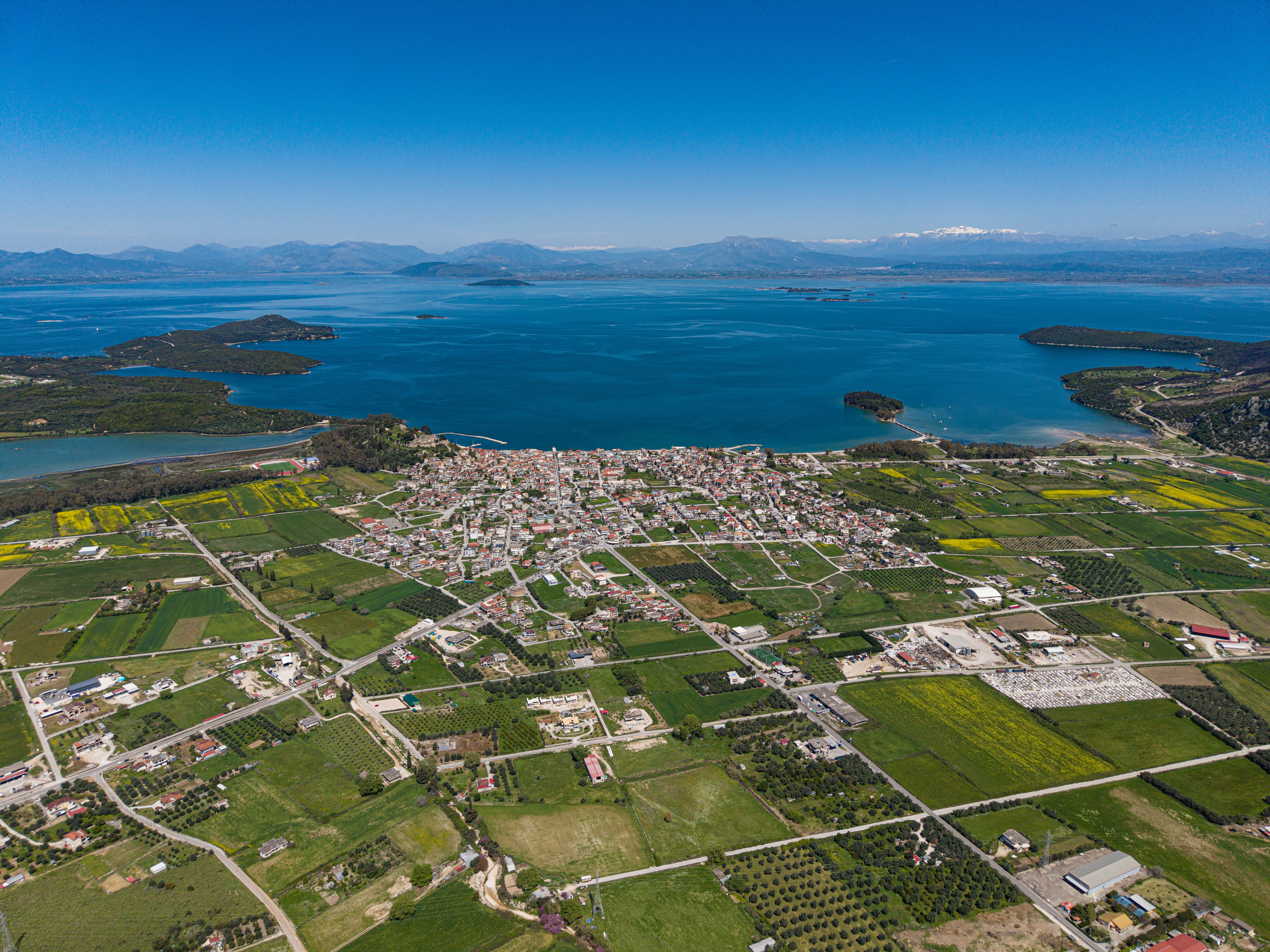

- Location within Greece
- Coordinates: 38°55′N 20°53′E
- Country: Greece
- Administrative region: West Greece
- Regional unit: Aetolia-Acarnania
- Municipality: Aktio-Vonitsa
- Municipal unit: Anaktorio

Population (2021)
  - Community: 4,264
- Time zone: UTC+2 (EET)
  - Summer (DST): UTC+3 (EEST)

Vonitsa (Greek: Βόνιτσα) is a town in the northwestern part of Aetolia-Acarnania in Greece, seat of the municipality of Aktio-Vonitsa. The beach town is situated on the south coast of the Ambracian Gulf, and is dominated by a Venetian fortress on a hill. Vonitsa is 13 kilometres (8 miles) southeast of Preveza, 18 kilometres (11 miles) northeast of the city of Lefkada and 90 kilometres (56 miles) northwest of Agrinio. The Greek National Road 42 (Lefkada - Amfilochia) passes through Vonitsa.

== Settlements ==
- Vonitsa proper
- Aktio, the ancient Actium
- Nea Kamarina

== History ==
Vonitsa is built near the site of ancient Anactorium, an important city of Acarnania, founded by the Corinthians in 630 BC. Like the other cities of Acarnania, it went into decline when the Romans founded Nicopolis on the other side of the Ambracian Gulf after the Battle of Actium, and forced its inhabitants to move to that city. Modern Vonitsa was founded during the Byzantine era, and it was the last stronghold of the Despotate of Epirus before being conquered by the Ottomans in 1479. It was later controlled by the Republic of Venice between 1684 and 1797, before returning to Ottoman rule. After the Greek War of Independence, the town became a part of the Kingdom of Greece in 1832.

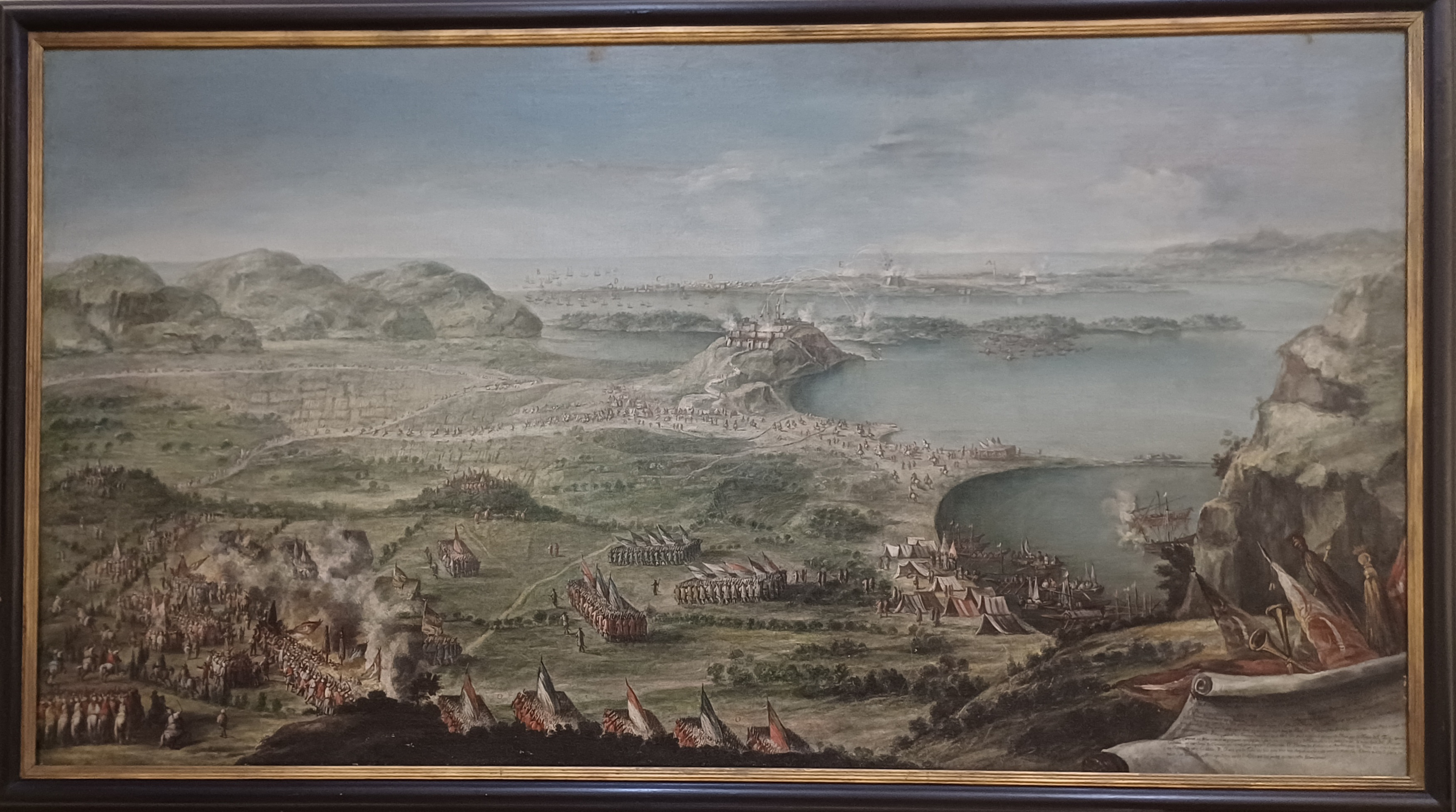
Capture of Vonitsa and Preveza by the Venetians in November 1717

On 18 October 1862 the insurrection that later spread to Athens and lead to the overthrow of King Otto of Greece, started in Vonitsa.

== Population ==
Year	Town	Community
1981	3,836	-
1991	4,037	-
2001	3,840	4,081
2011	4,703	4,916
2021	4,052	4,264

== International relations ==
Vonitsa is twinned with:

- Połaniec, Poland since 2001.

== See also ==
- List of settlements in Aetolia-Acarnania
- Diocese of Vonitsa
