= Aktio-Vonitsa =

Aktio–Vonitsa Άκτιο-Βόνιτσα
- Municipality
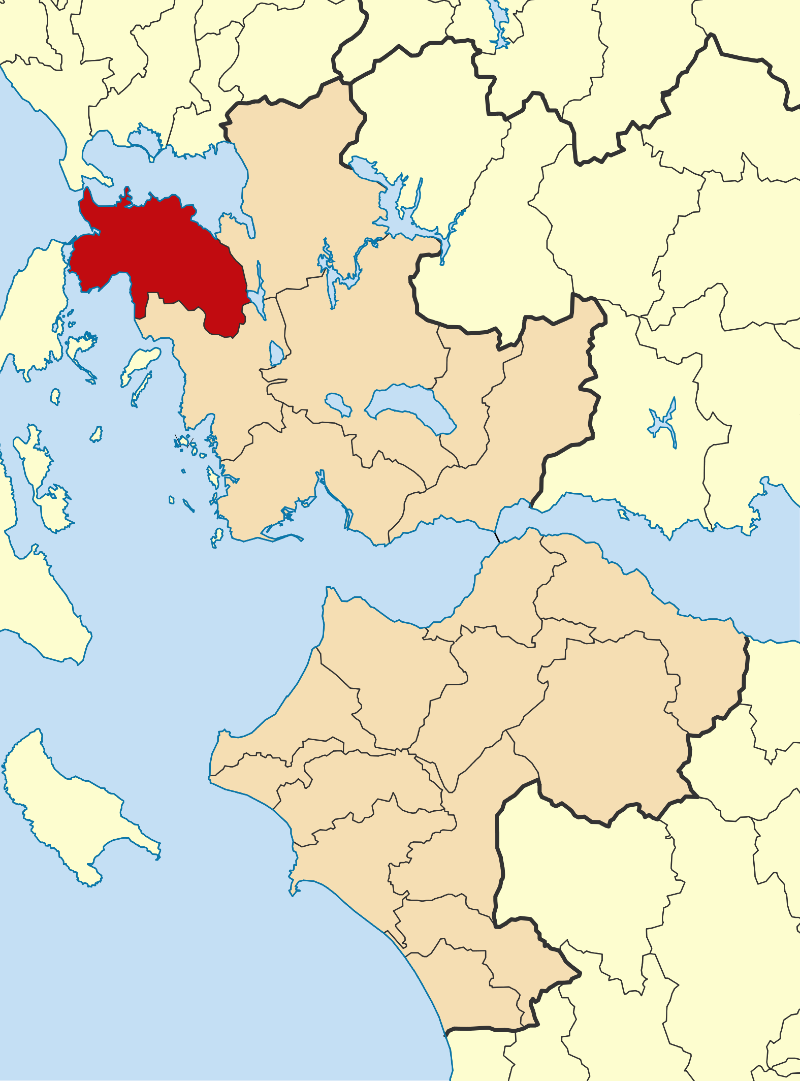

- Location within Greece
- Coordinates: 38°55′N 20°53′E
- Country: Greece
- Administrative region: West Greece
- Regional unit: Aetolia-Acarnania
- Seat: Vonitsa

Area
  - Municipality: 660.2 km^{2} (254.9 sq mi)

Population (2021)
  - Municipality: 14,644
  - Density: 22.18/km^{2} (57.45/sq mi)
- Time zone: UTC+2 (EET)
  - Summer (DST): UTC+3 (EEST)

Aktio–Vonitsa (Greek: Άκτιο-Βόνιτσα) is a municipality in the Aetolia-Acarnania regional unit of the West Greece region of Greece. Its seat is the town of Vonitsa. The municipality has an area of 660.172 km^{2}.

== Municipality ==
The municipality Aktio–Vonitsa was formed at the 2011 local government reform by the merger of the following 3 former municipalities, that became municipal units:

- Anaktorio
- Palairos (Kekropia)
- Medeon
