= Acarnania =

Coordinates: 38°45′N 21°05′E

Acarnania Ἀκαρνανία
- Region
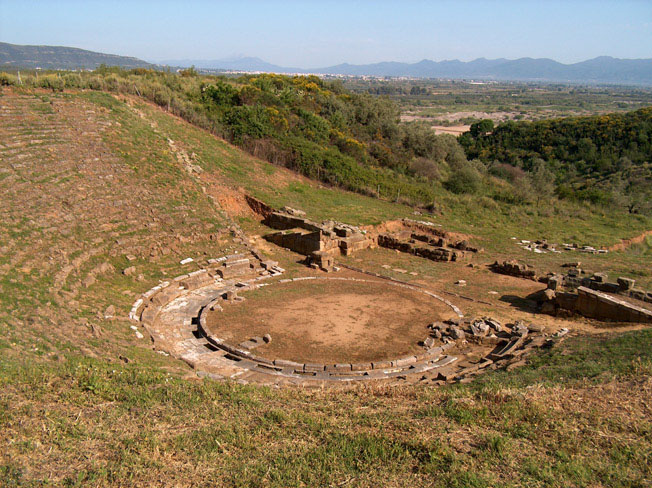
- Ruins of the theatre, Stratos

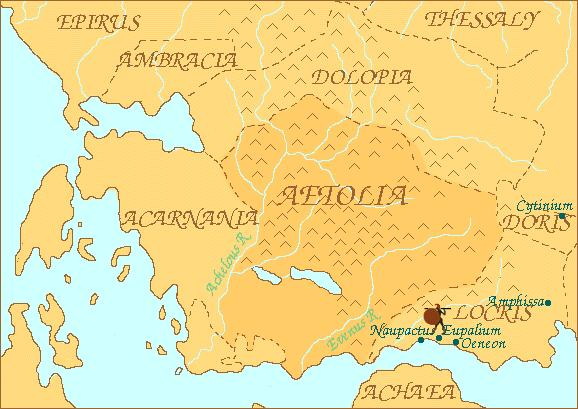
- Map of ancient Acarnania
- Country: Greece
- Location: Aetolia-Acarnania
- Major cities: Stratos
- Dialects: Northwest Doric

Acarnania (Ancient Greek: Ἀκαρνανία, romanized: Akarnanía) was the land of the ancient Greek tribe of Acarnanians in the westernmost part of central Greece. It lies along the Ionian Sea, west of Aetolia, with the Achelous River for a boundary, and north of the gulf of Calydon, which is the entrance to the Gulf of Corinth. Its capital and principal city was Stratos.

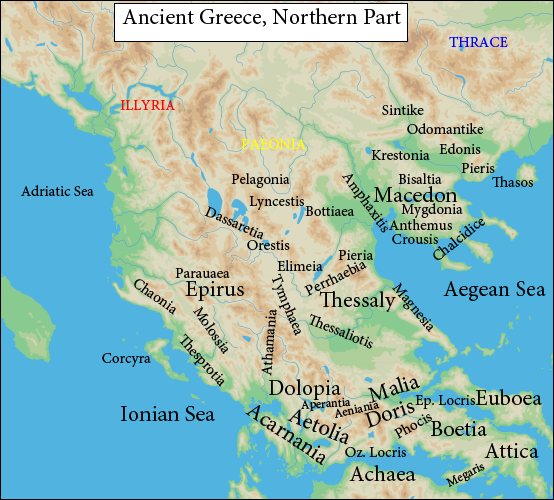
Ancient Greek Northern regions

== Geography ==
Acarnania is composed of three main regions: 1) a rocky coastline, 2) a rugged strip of mountain range that follows the coastline, and 3) plains lying between these mountains and the Achelous River.

Ancient Acarnania was reckoned the most westerly province of Greece, bounded on the north by the Ambracian Gulf, on the northeast by Amphilochia, on the west and southwest by the Ionian Sea, and on the east by Aetolia. It contained about 1,571 square miles (4,070 km^{2}). Under the Romans, or probably a little earlier, the river Achelous formed the boundary between Acarnania and Aetolia; but in the time of the Peloponnesian War, the territory of Oeniadae, which was one of the Acarnanian towns, extended east of this river. The interior of Acarnania was covered with forests and mountains of no great elevation. Between these mountains there are several lakes, and many fertile valleys. The chief river of the country is the Achelous, which in the lower part of its course flows through a vast plain of great natural fertility, called after itself the Paracheloitis. By the 19th century, the plain was covered with marshes, and the greater part of it appeared to have been formed by the alluvial depositions of the Achelous. Owing to this circumstance, and to the river having frequently altered its channel, the southern part of the coast of Acarnania has undergone numerous changes since antiquity. The chief affluent of the Achelous in Acarnania is the Anapus (Ἄναπος), which flowed into the main stream 80 stadia south of Stratus.

There are several promontories on the coast, but of these only two are especially named by writers in antiquity, the promontory of Actium and that of Crithote (Κριθωτή), on the west coast, forming one side of the small bay, on which the town of Astacus stood. Of the inland lakes, the only one mentioned by name by the classical writers is that of Melite (Μελίτη; the modern Lake Trichonida), 30 stadia long and 20 broad, north of the mouth of the Achelous, in the territory of Oeniadae. There was a lagoon, or salt lake, between Leucas and the Ambracian gulf, to which Strabo gives the name of Myrtuntium (Μυρτούντιον). Although the soil of Acarnania was fertile, it was not much cultivated by the inhabitants. The products of the country are rarely mentioned by the ancient writers. Pliny speaks of iron mines, and also of a pearl-fishery off Actium. The chief wealth of the inhabitants consisted in their herds and flocks, which pastured in the rich meadows in the lower part of the Achelous. There were numerous islands off the western coast of Acarnania. Of these the most important were the Echinades, extending from the mouth of the Achelous along the shore to the North; the Taphiae Insulae, lying between Leucas and Acarnania, and Leucas itself, which originally formed part of the mainland of Acarnania, but was afterwards separated from the latter by a canal.

== History ==
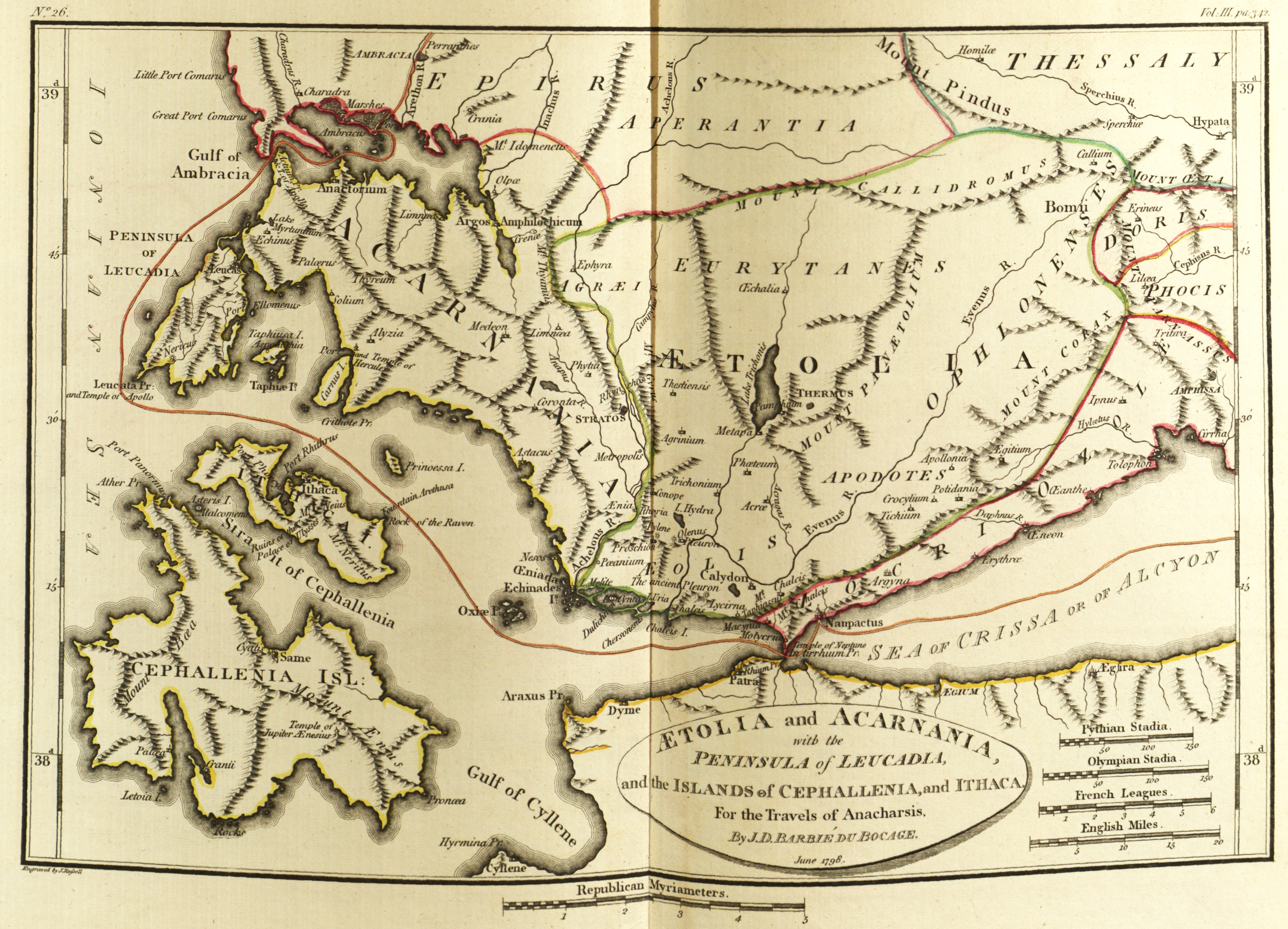
Map of ancient Acarnania.

=== Mythology ===
Acarnania's foundation in Greek mythology was traditionally ascribed to Acarnan, son of Alcmaeon.

The name of Acarnania appears to have been unknown in the earliest times. Homer (8th century BC) only calls the country opposite Ithaca and Cephalonia, under the general name of "Epeirus" (῎ηπειρος), or the mainland, although he frequently mentions the Aetolians. (Note: In the year 239 BC, the Acarnanians, in the embassy which they sent to Rome to solicit assistance, pleaded that they had taken no part in the expedition against Troy, the ancestor of Rome, being the first time probably, as Thirlwall remarks, that they had ever boasted of the omission of their name from the Homeric catalog. Justin, 28.1; Connop Thirlwall, Hist. of Greece, vol. viii. pp. 119–120.)

The country is said to have been originally inhabited by the Taphii (or Teleboae), the Leleges, and the Curetes. The Taphii, or Teleboae were chiefly found in the islands off the western coast of Acarnania, where they maintained themselves by piracy. The Leleges were more widely disseminated, and were also in possession at one period of Aetolia, Locris, and other parts of Greece. The Curetes are said to have come from Aetolia, and to have settled in Acarnania, after they had been expelled from the former country by Aetolus and his followers. The name of Acarnania is derived from Acarnan, the son of Alcmaeon, who is said to have settled at the mouth of the Achelous. If this tradition is of any value, it would intimate that an Argive colony settled on the coast of Acarnania at an early period.

=== Archaic and Classical era ===
In the 7th century BC, Corinth settled Anactorium, Sollium and Leucas, and Kefalonia settled Astacus in Acarnania. The original inhabitants of the country were driven more into the interior; they never made much progress in the arts of civilised life; and even at the time of the Peloponnesian War, they were a rude and barbarous people, engaged in continual wars with their neighbours, and living by robbery and piracy. The settlements of Alyzeia, Coronta, Limnaea, Medion, Oeniadae, Palaerus, Phoitiai and Stratus are also mentioned by Thucydides; the latter city being the seat of a loose confederation of Acarnanian powers that was maintained until the late 1st century BC.

The ancient Acarnanians were Greeks, and as such were allowed to contend in the great Pan-Hellenic games. Like other rude mountaineers, the Acarnanians are praised for their fidelity and courage. They formed good light-armed troops, and were excellent slingers. They lived, for the most part, dispersed in villages, retiring, when attacked, to the mountains.

Strabo relates that they were united, however, in the Acarnanian League, of which Aristotle wrote an account in a work now lost (Ἀκαρνάνων Πολιτεία). Thucydides mentions a hill, named Olpae, near the Amphilochian Argos, which the Acarnanians had fortified as a place of judicial meeting for the settlement of disputes. The meetings of the League were usually held at Stratus, which was the chief town in Acarnania; but, in the time of the Romans, the meetings took place either at Thyrium, or at Leucas, the latter of which places became, at that time, the chief city in Acarnania.

At an early period, when part of Amphilochia belonged to the Acarnanians, they used to hold a public judicial congress at Olpae, a fortified hill about 3 miles (4.8 km) from Argos Amphilochicum. Of the constitution of their League, we have scarcely any particulars. We learn from an inscription found at Punta, the site of ancient Actium, that there were a council and a general assembly of the people, by which decrees were passed: Ἔδοξε τᾷ βουλᾷ καὶ τῷ κοινῷ τῶν Ἁκαρνάνων. At the head of the League, there was a strategus (Στρατηγός) or general; and the council had a secretary (γραμματεύς), who appears to have been a person of importance, as in the Achaean and Aetolian Leagues. The chief priest (ἱεραπόλος) of the temple of Apollo at Actium seems to have been a person of high rank; and either his name or that of the strategus was employed for official dates, like that of the first Archon at Athens.

Their hatred against the Corinthian settlers, who had deprived them of all their best ports, naturally led the Acarnanians to side with the Athenians; but the immediate cause of their alliance with the latter arose from the expulsion of the Amphilochians from the town of Argos Amphilochicum by the Corinthian settlers from Ambracia, in about 432 BC. The Acarnanians espoused the cause of the expelled Amphilochians, and in order to obtain the restoration of the latter, they applied for assistance to Athens. The Athenians accordingly sent an expedition under Phormio, who took Argos, expelled the Ambraciots, and restored the town to the Amphilochians and Acarnanians. An alliance was now formally concluded between the Acarnamians and Athenians. The only towns of Acarnania which did not join it were Oeniadae and Astacus.

The Acarnanians were of great service in maintaining the supremacy of Athens in the western part of Greece, and they distinguished themselves particularly in 426 BC, when they gained a victory under the command of Demosthenes over the Peloponnesians and Ambraciots at the Battle of Olpae. At the conclusion of this campaign they concluded a peace with the Ambraciots, although they still continued to be allies of Athens. In 391 BC, we find the Acarnanians engaged in war with the Achaeans, who had taken possession of Calydon in Aetolia; and as the latter were hard-pressed by the Acarnanians, they applied for aid to the Lacedaemonians (Spartans), who sent an army into Acarnania, commanded by King Agesilaus. The latter ravaged the country, but his expedition was not attended with any lasting consequences, whilst the cities of Acarnania surrendered to the Lacedaemonians under Agesilaus, and continued to be Spartan allies for a time, they joined the Second Athenian League in 375 BC. The Acarnanians later sided with the Boeotians in their fight against Sparta, and with Athens and Thebes against Philip II of Macedon at Chaeronea.

=== Hellenistic period ===
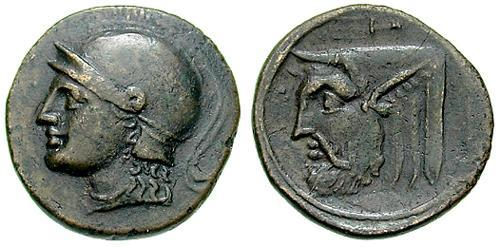
Ancient coin of Acarnania, c. 300–167 BC

After the time of Alexander the Great, in 314 BC, at the behest of the Macedonian king Cassander, the settlements of Acarnania lying near the Aetolian border were conglomerated into fewer, larger settlements. Then, Acarnania came under the rule of Pyrrhus of Epirus.

Acarnania's territory was partitioned between the Aetolian League and Epirus in, c. 250 BC. After the fall of the Aeacid dynasty of Epirus, the Acarnanian territory that had been given to Epirus regained its independence, and Leucas became the capital of the region, but conflict with the Aetolians remained. The Acarnanians in consequence united themselves closely to the Antigonid kings, to whom they remained faithful in their various vicissitudes of fortune. They refused to desert the cause of Philip in his war with the Romans, and it was not till after the capture of Leucas, their principal town, and the defeat of Philip at the Battle of Cynoscephalae that they submitted to Rome. When Antiochus III king of the Seleucid Empire, invaded Greece, in 191 BC, the Acarnanians were persuaded by their countryman Mnasilochus to espouse his cause; but on the expulsion of Antiochus from Greece, they came again under the supremacy of Rome. In the settlement of the affairs of Greece by Aemilius Paulus and the Roman commissioners after the defeat of Perseus (168 BC), Leucas was separated from Acarnania, and the city of Thyrreion was appointed the new capital.

=== Roman and Byzantine period ===
In the 1st century BC, Acarnania suffered greatly at the hands of pirates, and in Roman civil wars. When Greece was reduced to the form of a Roman province, it is doubtful whether Acarnania was annexed to the province of Achaea or of Epirus, but it is mentioned at a later time as part of Epirus. The inhabitants of several of its towns were removed by Augustus to Nicopolis, which he founded after the Battle of Actium, and Acarnania fell under that city's rule; and in the time of Augustus emperor the country is described by Strabo as utterly worn out and exhausted.

In 395, it became part of the Eastern Roman Empire. When the empire was attacked by Western powers in the Fourth Crusade (1204), Acarnania passed to the Despotate of Epirus and in 1348 it was conquered by Serbia. Then in 1480 it fell to the Ottoman Empire.

== Modern ==
Since 1832 Acarnania has been part of Greece. Today it forms the western part of the regional unit of Aetolia-Acarnania.

== List of Acarnanians ==
- Carnus, seer of Apollo who established the cult of Apollo Carneus among the Dorians; see also Carneia
- Amphilytus, seer of Peisistratos (Athens)
- Megistias, seer at the battle of Thermopylae
- Lysimachus of Acarnania, one of the tutors of Alexander the Great
- Philip of Acarnania, one of the physicians of Alexander the Great
- Machatas (sculptor)
- Aristomenes of Acarnania, guardian and regent of Ptolemy V Epiphanes, a king of Ptolemaic Egypt
- Alexander of Acarnania, general of Antiochus the Great

== See also ==
- List of cities in ancient Acarnania
- List of cities in Acarnania
- List of traditional Greek place names

== Sources ==
- Hornblower, Simon (1996). "Acarnania". The Oxford Classical Dictionary. Oxford: Oxford University Press. pp. 2–3.
- Chisholm, Hugh, ed. (1911). "Acarnania" . Encyclopædia Britannica (11th ed.). Cambridge University Press.
- Lang, Franziska (2013). Interdisziplinäre Forschungen in Akarnanien. Akarnanien-Forschungen 1. Bonn: Habelt. ISBN 978-3-7749-3877-9.
