= Greek colonisation =

Archaic Greek expansion across the Mediterranean and Black Sea (750–550 BC)

Greek territories and colonies (Archaic period: 750–550 BC)

The Greek colonisation was the expansion of Archaic Greeks across the Mediterranean and the Black Sea, particularly during the 8th–6th centuries BCE.

The Archaic expansion differed from the Iron Age migrations of the Greek Dark Ages, in that it consisted of organised direction by oikistes away from the originating metropolis rather than the simplistic movement of tribes, which characterised the aforementioned earlier migrations. Many colonies, or apoikiai (Greek: ἀποικία, transl. "home away from home"), that were founded during this period eventually evolved into strong Greek city-states, functioning independently of their metropolis.

== Motives ==
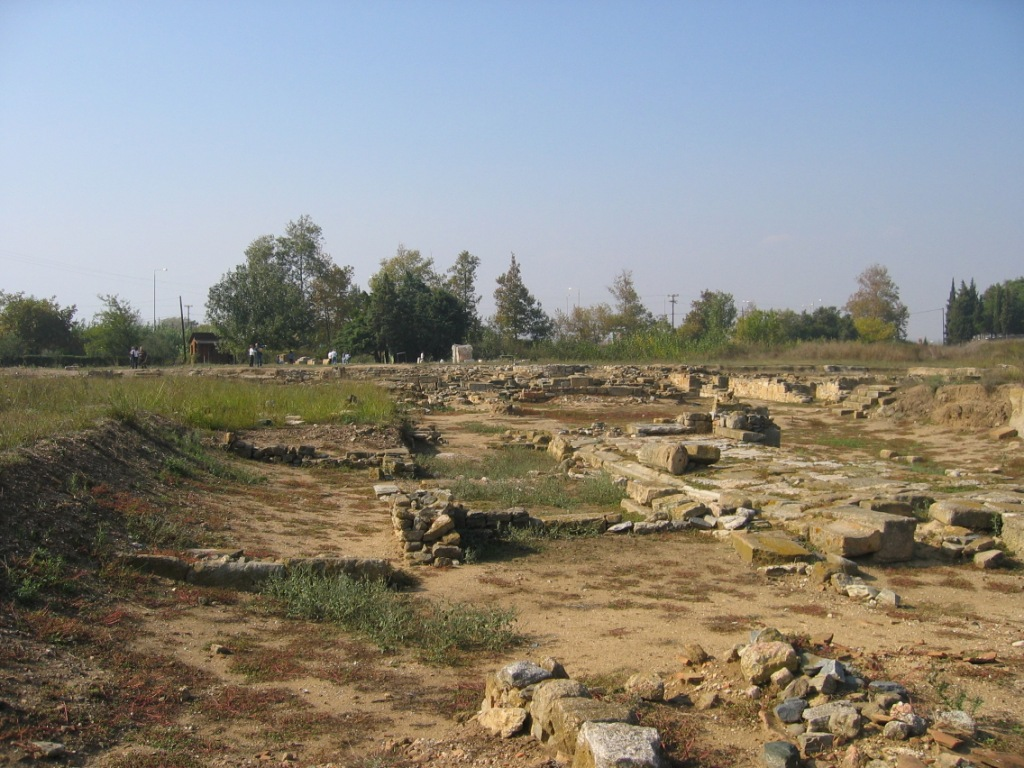
Ruins of Abdera, a classical city of Thrace, in present-day Greece

Greek colonisation was typically motivated by a combination of factors, depending on the context. Many Greek city-states experienced strong economic growth with consequent overpopulation of the motherland, such that the existing territory of these Greek city-states could no longer support a growing polity. The areas where the Greeks would try to colonise were hospitable and fertile.

As well as demographic pressure, environmental factors could prompt the colonisation of other lands. Herodotus's account of the founding of the colony of Cyrene in Libya tells of social unrest on the island of Thera (the colony's metropolis), caused by severe overpopulation and a prolonged drought. Herodotus provided two different accounts for the founding of Cyrene. The version of the Cyreneans emphasised the divine appointment of Battus (the founder) by the oracle of Apollo to establish a colony in Libya. Herodotus' inclusion of religious prophecies and mythical elements reflected a bias towards the role of religion as one of the factors that contributed to colonisation. In contrast, the version provided by the Therans focused on their King Grinnus (or Grinus) and his instruction to send Battus to set up a colony in Libya. Even though this account was more realistic, it might also have served as propaganda for the Therans to maintain their historical and cultural ties with the Cyreneans for economic and political benefits.

Fertile lands in the Peloponnese are limited. Thucydides mentioned that early Greek city states often fought for quality soil used in agriculture by conducting violent raids. This placed more strain on the general populace of city states, which made it hard for communities to settle and encouraged migration.

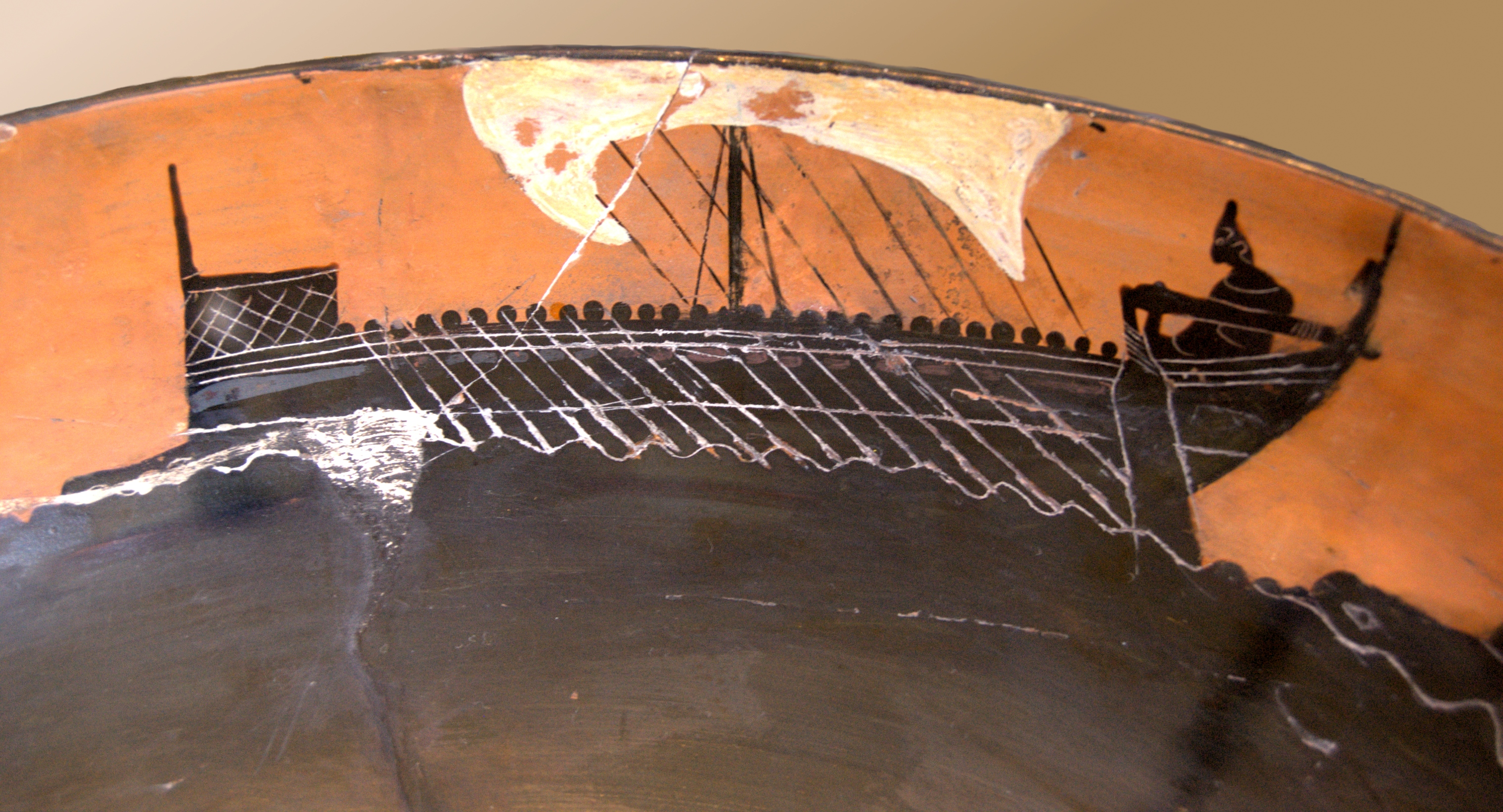
Illustration of an Archaic Greek ship on pottery, c. 520 BC

Another reason for Greek colonisation was the expansion of influence. As ancient Greeks in the Peloponnese and Ionia developed a sense of identity, they had the desire to spread their culture through colonisation. During the early days of Greek colonisation (8th to 7th centuries BCE), the apoikia (ἀποικία) was one of the most common types of Greek colony. Even though these colonies were usually independent of the metropolis and had their own governance, they usually modelled their systems on those of their mother city. Furthermore, apoikiai (ᾰ̓ποικῐ́αι) usually maintained strong cultural ties with the metropolis through their mutual heritage; this allowed mainstream Greek culture to spread to native populations.

Didorus's account on the founding of the colony of Thurium was driven by the invitation of the Sybarites to establish a panhellenic colony from various Greek city states. Archeological excavations have uncovered ruined Greek structures and artifacts which might give insights into the city's Greek origin. Moreover, the Athenians were eager to expand their influence and seek allies during the Peloponnesian War. Thucydides' account of the Athenian's attempt to colonise Sicily during the Peloponnesian War was due to the support from Sicilian cities which highlights the importance of establishing alliances to expand their own sphere of influence.

In some cases, some colonies were founded to escape from civil unrest or political instability. For instance, identity crisis in the metropolis caused political and social tensions, which resulted in expulsion of certain groups. Strabo mentioned the founding of Taras by the Parthenians, who were the descendants of Spartan women but were denied full rights citizenship. After a failed attempt to plot against the local citizens, they were urged to find the colony of Taras to prevent further conflict. Strabo's account of the founding of Taras by the Parthenians aligned with other historical context, such as the Messenian war, which gave birth to the Parthenians. By sending one of the parties away, social conflicts could be alleviated in the mother city. Modern researchers also suggest factors such as fleeing from a crime or even exploration could motivate others to set up new colonies.

Modern scholarship suggests the recognition of economic and strategic value leads to further colonisation. Many colonies were established along the Mediterranean and Black Sea as trading hubs and centers of commerce. These colonies were called Emporion (ἐμπόριον), which were usually founded in strategic locations that allowed them to control and facilitate certain trade routes. Over time, they were transformed into important trading centres. For example, Emporion colonies were set up along the coasts of southern Italy and Sicily due to the abundance of natural resources and fertile lands. This helped facilitate maritime trade and expand their own trade network. Moreover, they could regulate taxes as they developed into larger colonies, which could contribute to the long-term economic prosperity of the metropolis. Other colonies were established along the coastline as military outposts to protect the trade routes. The main goal of the Sicilian expedition undertaken by the Athenians during the Peloponnesian War was to capture Syracuse, a major strategic point and ally of the Spartan-led Peloponnesian League. According to Thucydides, the Athenians were also attracted to the wealth and resources available there even though it was exaggerated. Furthermore, he claimed that the capture of Sicily would solidify their power in the Mediterranean world. Even though Thucydides overemphasised personal factors, such as the desire for wealth and glory of individuals, modern scholars recognise the strategic importance of such expeditions that would help shape the decisions made by those individuals. By capturing Sicily, they would gain dominance over trade routes in the Mediterranean. This demonstrates that the Athenians were likely aware of the strategic and trade benefits that were brought by colonies.

During the 5th to 4th century BC, a new type of colony called Cleruchies (κληρουχία) was established by the Athenian empire. Unlike other Greek colonies, Cleruchies were politically dependent on Athens, where its governance was modelled after Athens and its citizen retained Athenian citizenship. Moreover, citizens living inside these colonies were granted lands in exchange for military service and had to pay taxes to Athens.

There are debates on the other motives of Cleruchies. Ancient sources suggest that Cleruchies were set up to alleviate poverty by giving land to the poor. Plutarch's account implies Cleruchies were established as a social welfare measure by distributing land to the poor. Moreover, there were ancient inscriptions in the Cleruchy of Brea that intends for land allocation only for the lower and middle classes, excluding higher property classes. On the contrary, some ancient Greek grave markers in the Cleruchy of Euboea suggest that wealthy individuals resided in the colony. Furthermore, archaeological evidence on the site of Vrachos on Euboea suggests that it was not solely populated by the poor. For instance, the presence of 200 non-Athenian mercenaries in the area as well as strong fortifications suggests heavy economic and military investments there. Other modern scholars suggest that the motive was to safeguard grain fleets and Cleruchies were set up along the route to the Black Sea, where the land was more fertile than in Greece. Some islands, such as Lesbos, contributed significantly to Athens through rent from settlements. Hence, Cleruchies were important to Athens not only as strategic locations but also as a source of wealth in the form of agriculture and rents, which were vital during the Peloponnesian War.

== Characteristics ==
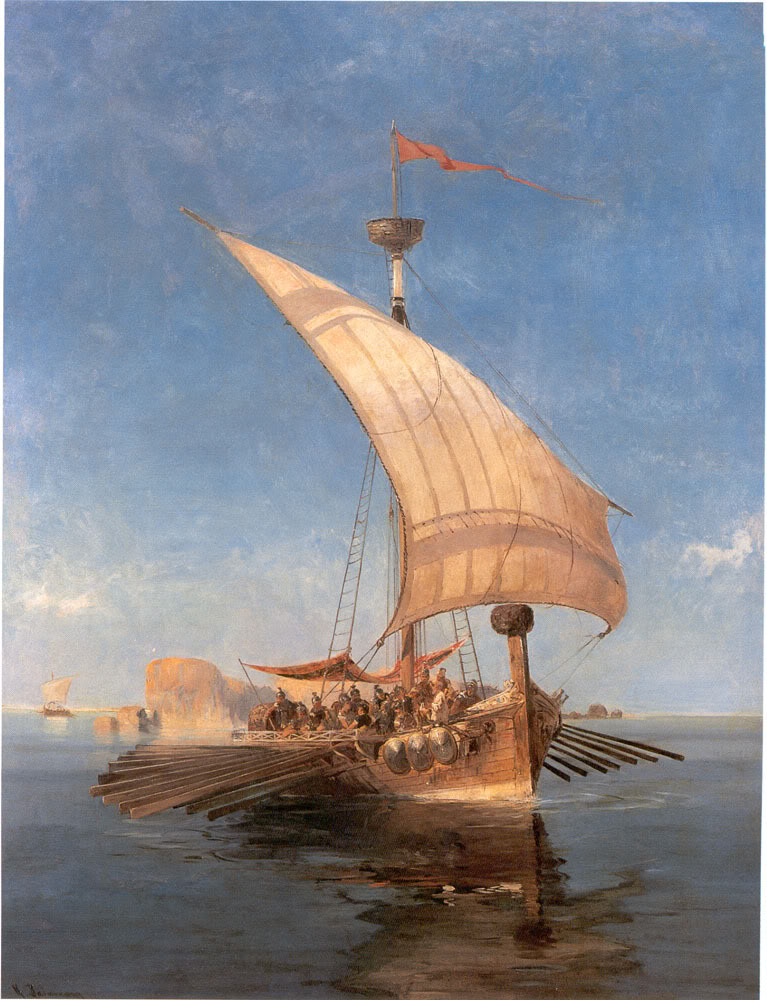
The Argonautica, the myth thought to pertain to the bold nautical expeditions of this period

The founding of the colonies was typically an organised enterprise by the metropolis (mother city), although in many cases it could involve collaboration with other cities. In order to create a feeling of security and confidence in the new colony, the place to be colonised was decided in advance with the goal of offering business advantages and protection from raiders. The mission always included a leader, or oikistes, nominated by the colonists. In the new cities, the colonists parcelled out the land, including farms. The system of governance usually took a form similar to that of the metropolis.

Greek colonies were often established along coastlines, especially during the period of colonisation between the 8th and 6th centuries BC. Many Greek colonies were strategically positioned near coastlines to facilitate trade, communication, and access to maritime resources. These colonies played a crucial role in expanding Greek culture, trade networks, and influence throughout the Mediterranean and Black Sea regions. While some colonies were established inland for various reasons, coastal locations were generally more common due to the Greeks' strong connection to the sea.

While the term ἐποικισμός referred to the founding of a new settlement or colony, the term ἐνοικισμός was used to describe the settlement of Greeks among native populations, as in the case of the Greek quarter at Gravisca.

== History ==
The Greeks started colonising around the beginning of the 8th century BC when the Euboeans founded Pithecusae in Southern Italy and Olynthus in Chalcidice, Greece. Subsequently, they founded the colonies of Cumae, Zancle, Rhegium and Naxos.

At the end of the 8th century, Euboea fell into decline with the outbreak of the Lelantine War but other Greeks—such as the Ionians and Corinthians—continued to found colonies. The Ionians started their first colonies around the 7th century in Southern Italy, Thrace and on the Black Sea. Thera founded Cyrene and Andros, and Samos founded multiple colonies in the Northern Aegean.

The Greek "colonies" differed from many colonies established in later history:

To use the term 'colonization" for this expansion is problematic, since it invites false associations. Unlike the colonization whereby early modern states seized the New World, the settlement of the Mediterranean was not centrally controlled. The oracle at Delphi seems to have been a hub where information was gathered, but settlements emanated from a multitude of Greek poleis. It is even in doubt whether the foundations had any official character. At least in some cases, it is more likely that they were private initiatives. Often, cities may well not have emerged through a single founding act, but developed from trading posts that were initially intended to be temporary. Whereas in the early modern period, gaining and developing land were important goals of colonization, the settlements of the Greeks were limited to coastal regions and did not involve demanding tribute or laying claim to the hinterland. And unlike the Spanish and English empires, the new settlements quickly became independent of the mother cities. The term 'early Greek/great Greek colonization' is therefore placed here between inverted commas.

Wiebke Denecke summarises: "The 'Great Greek Colonization' [...] peaked between 750–500 BC, when Greek-speaking people of about twenty Greek municipalities on the Greek mainland, the West coast of Asia minor, modern-day Turkey, created a couple of hundred trading ports on the coasts of southern Italy, the Black Sea, and Gaul.

== Locations ==
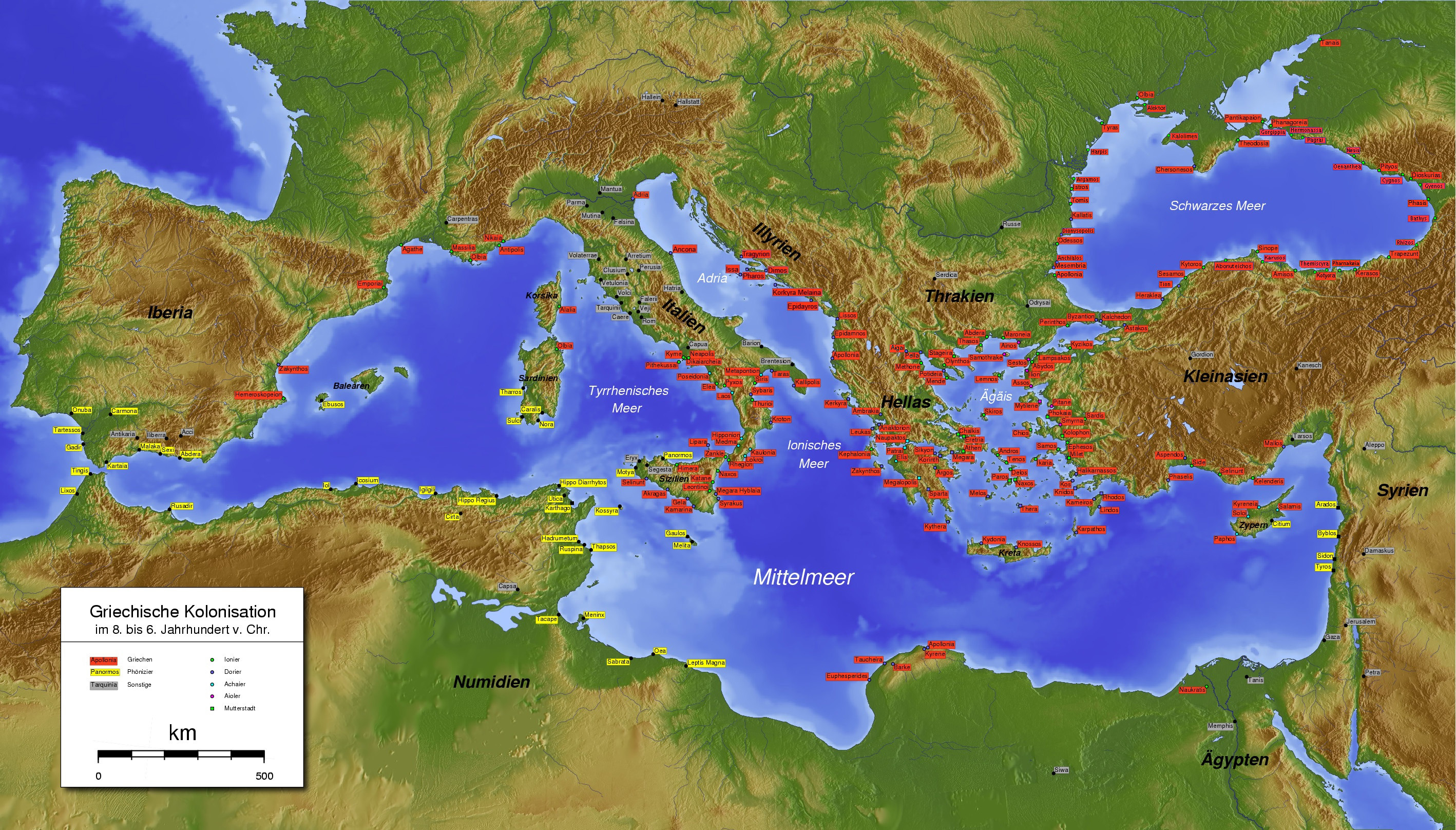
Greek colonies and their metropolitan cities depicted with red labels, while Phoenician colonies are depicted with yellow labels (4th century BC)

=== Macedonia and Thrace ===
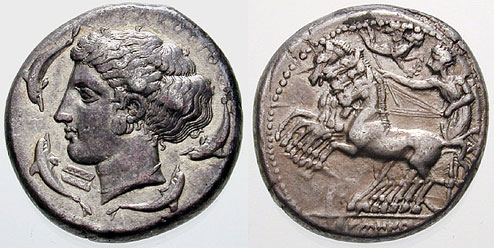
A Syracusan tetradrachm (c. 415–405 BC), sporting Arethusa and a quadriga

Numerous colonies were founded in Northern Greece, chiefly in the region of Chalcidice but also in the region of Thrace.

Chalcidice was settled by Euboeans, chiefly from Chalcis, who lent their name to these colonies. The most important settlements of the Euboeans in Chalcidice were Olynthos (which was settled in collaboration with the Athenians), Torone, Mende, Sermyle, Aphytis and Cleonae in the peninsula of Athos. Other important colonies in Chalcidice were Acanthus, founded by colonists from Andros and Potidaea, a colony of Corinth. Thasians with the help of the Athenian Callistratus of Aphidnae founded the city of Datus. During the Peloponnesian War, the Athenians with the Hagnon, son of Nikias founded the city of Ennea Hodoi (Ἐννέα ὁδοὶ), meaning nine roads, at the current location of the "Hill 133" north of Amphipolis in Serres.

Numerous other colonies were founded in the region of Thrace by the Ionians from the coast of Asia Minor. Important colonies were Maroneia, and Abdera. The Milesians also founded Abydos and Cardia on the Hellespont and Rhaedestus in Propontis. The Samians colonised the island of Samothrace, becoming the source of its name. Finally, the Parians colonised Thasos under the leadership of the oecist and father of the poet Archilochus, Telesicles.

In 340 BC, while Alexander the Great was regent of Macedon, he founded the city of Alexandropolis Maedica after defeating a local Thracian tribe.

=== Magna Graecia: mainland Italy and Sicily ===
Ancient Greek colonies and their dialect groupings in Magna Graecia and in Sicily

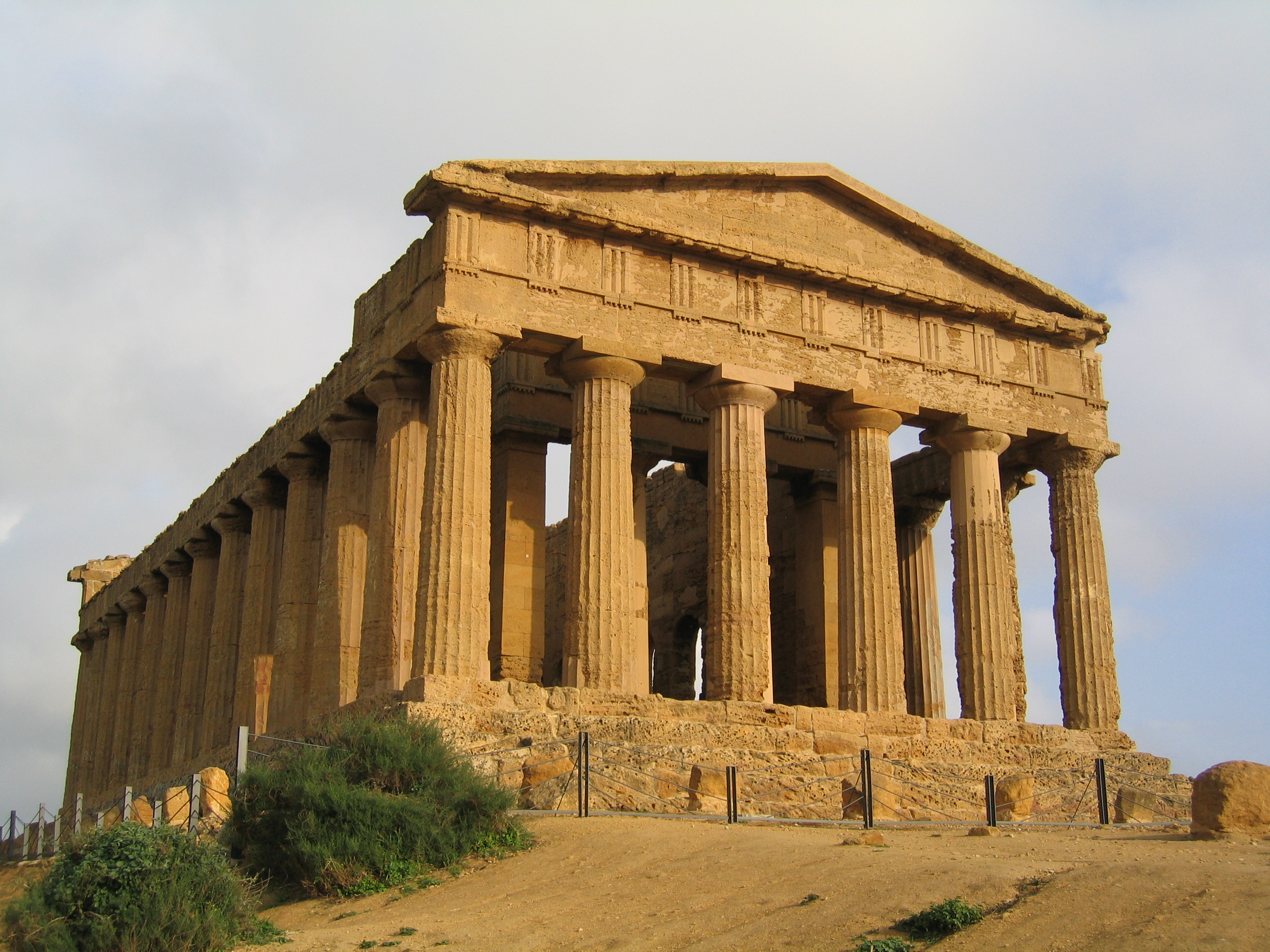
The Temple of Concordia, Valle dei Templi, in present-day Italy

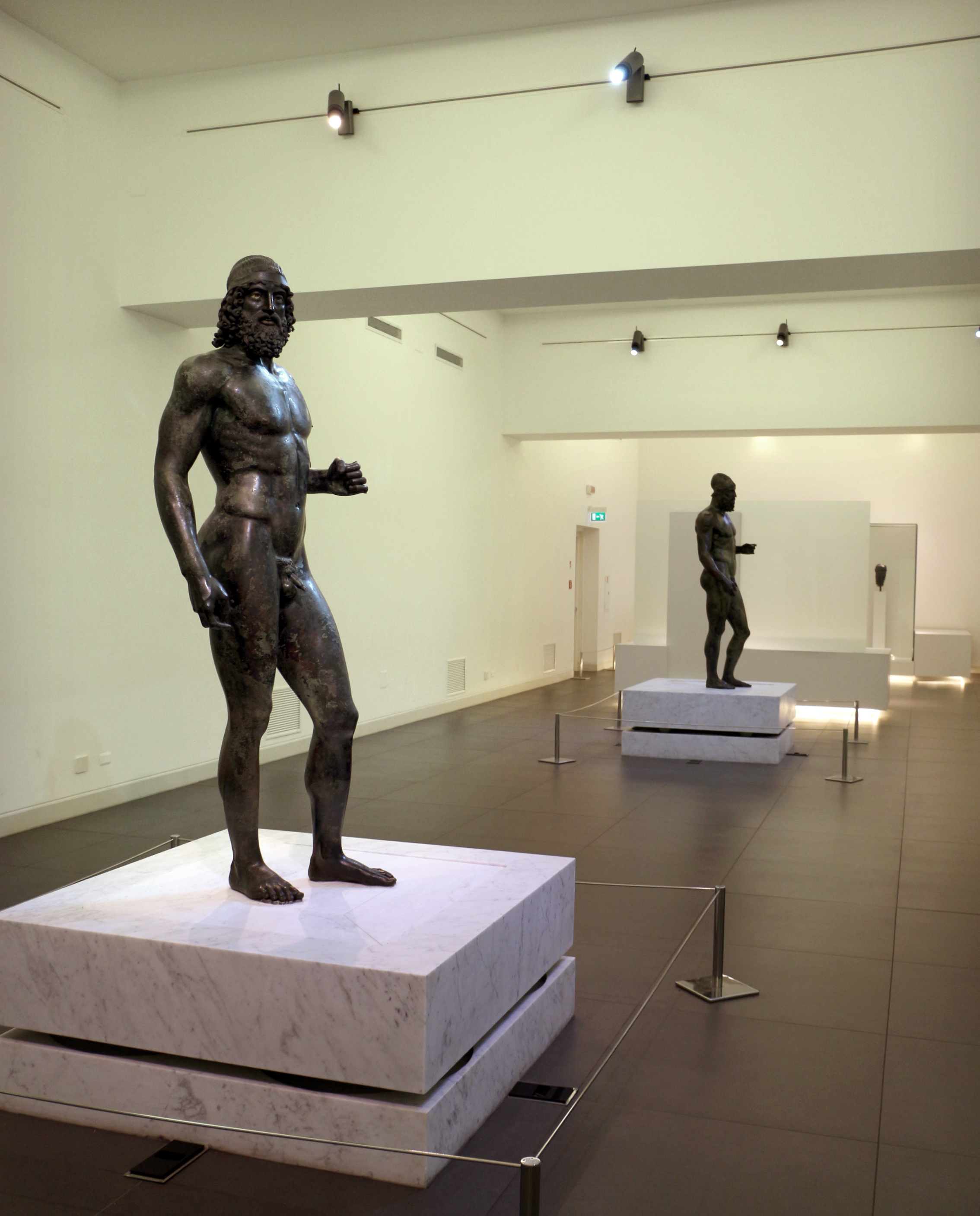
Riace Bronzes exhibited in the National Museum of Magna Graecia in Reggio Calabria

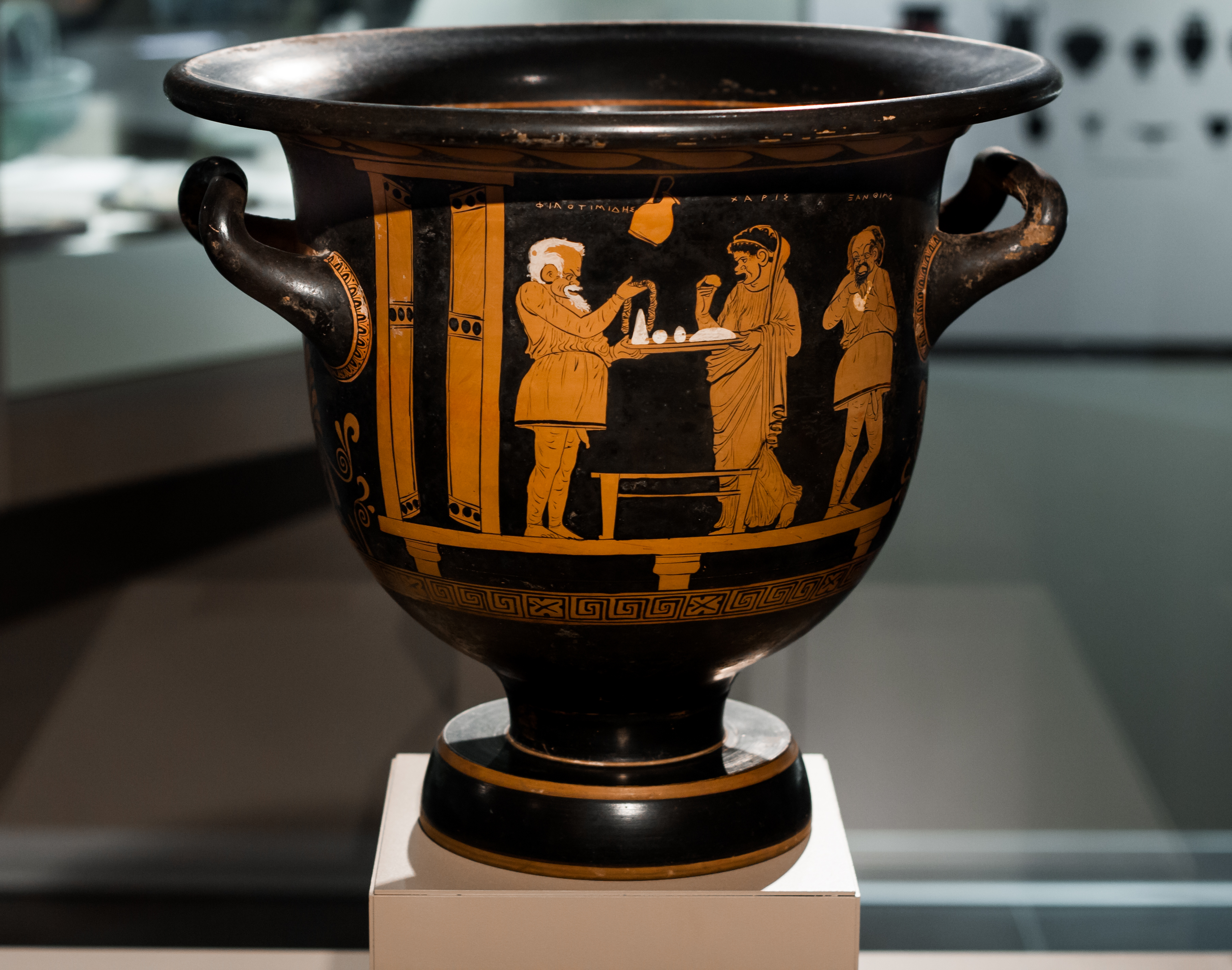
Apulian pottery exhibited in the Archaeological Museum of Milan, 380–370 BC

Magna Graecia was the name given by the Romans to the coastal areas of Southern Italy in the present-day Italian regions of Calabria, Apulia, Basilicata, Campania and Sicily which were extensively settled by Greeks.

Greeks began to settle in southern Italy in the 8th century BC.

The first great migratory wave directed towards the western Mediterranean was that of the Euboeans aimed at the Gulf of Naples who, after Pithecusae (on the isle of Ischia), the oldest Greek settlement in Italy, founded Cumae nearby, their first colony on the mainland, and then in the Strait of Messina, Zancle in Sicily, and nearby on the opposite coast, Rhegium.

The second wave was of the Achaeans who concentrated initially on the Ionian coast (Metapontion, Poseidonia, Sybaris, Kroton), shortly before 720 BC. At an unknown date between the 8th and 6th centuries BC the Athenians, of Ionian lineage, founded Scylletium (near today's Catanzaro).

In Sicily the Euboeans later founded Naxos, which became the base for the founding of the cities of Leontini, Tauromenion and Catania. They were accompanied by small numbers of Dorians and Ionians; the Athenians had notably refused to take part in the colonisation. The strongest of the Sicilian colonies was Syracuse, an 8th-century BC colony of the Corinthians.

Refugees from Sparta founded Taranto which evolved into one of the most powerful cities in the area. Megara founded Megara Hyblaea and Selinous; Phocaea founded Elea; Rhodes founded Gela together with the Cretans and Lipari together with Cnidus; the Locrians founded Epizephyrian Locris. According to legend, Lagaria which was between Thurii and the river Sinni River was founded by Phocians.

Evidence of frequent contact between the Greek settlers and the indigenous peoples comes from Timpone Della Motta which shows influence of Greek style in Oneotroian pottery.

Many cities in the region became in turn metropoleis for new colonies such as the Syracusans, who founded the city of Camarina in the south of Sicily; or the Zancleans, who led the founding of the colony of Himera. Likewise, Naxos, which founded many colonies while Sybaris founded the colony of Poseidonia. Gela founded its own colony, Acragas.

With colonisation, Greek culture was exported to Italy with its dialects of the Ancient Greek language, its religious rites, and its traditions of the independent polis. An original Hellenic civilisation soon developed, and later interacted with the native Italic civilisations. One of the most important cultural transplants was the Chalcidean/Cumaean variety of the Greek alphabet which was adopted by the Etruscans; the Old Italic alphabet subsequently evolved into the Latin alphabet, which became the most widely used alphabet in the world.

Colonies
City		Year (BCE) of foundation - by author			
	Greek	Thucydides	Eusebius	Jerome	Others
Cumae	Κύμη	–	–	1050(?)	–
Metapontum	Μεταπόντιον	–	773(?)	–	–
Zancle	Ζάγκλη	–	757/756	–	756
Naxos	Νάξος	734	735	741	–
Syracuse	Συράκουσαι	733	733	738/737	733
Lentini	Λεοντῖνοι	728	–	–	–
Catania	Κατάνη	728	733	737/736	–
Megara	Μέγαρα	727	–	–	–
Reggio	Ερυθρά / Ρήγιον	–	–	–	c. 730
Milazzo	Μύλαι	–	715(?)	716(?)	–
Sybaris	Σύβαρις	–	708–707	709–708	721/720
Crotone	Κρότων	–	709	–	709/708
Taranto	Τάρας	–	–	706	–
Locri	Λοκροί Ἐπιζεφύριοι	–	673	679	c. 700
Poseidonia	Ποσειδωνία	–	–	–	700(?)
Gela	Γέλα	688	688	691/690	–
Caulonia	Καυλωνία	–	–	–	c. 675
Acre		663	–	–	–
Casmene	Κασμέναι	643	–	–	–
Selinunte	Σελινούς	627	757(?)	650/649	650
Himera	Ιμέρα	–	–	–	648
Lipari	Μελιγουνίς	–	627(?)	629(?)	580/576
Camarina	Καμάρινα	598	598/597	601/600	598/596
Agrigento	Ακράγας	580	–	–	580/576

=== Colonies of Corinth in Adriatic Sea and Ionian Sea ===
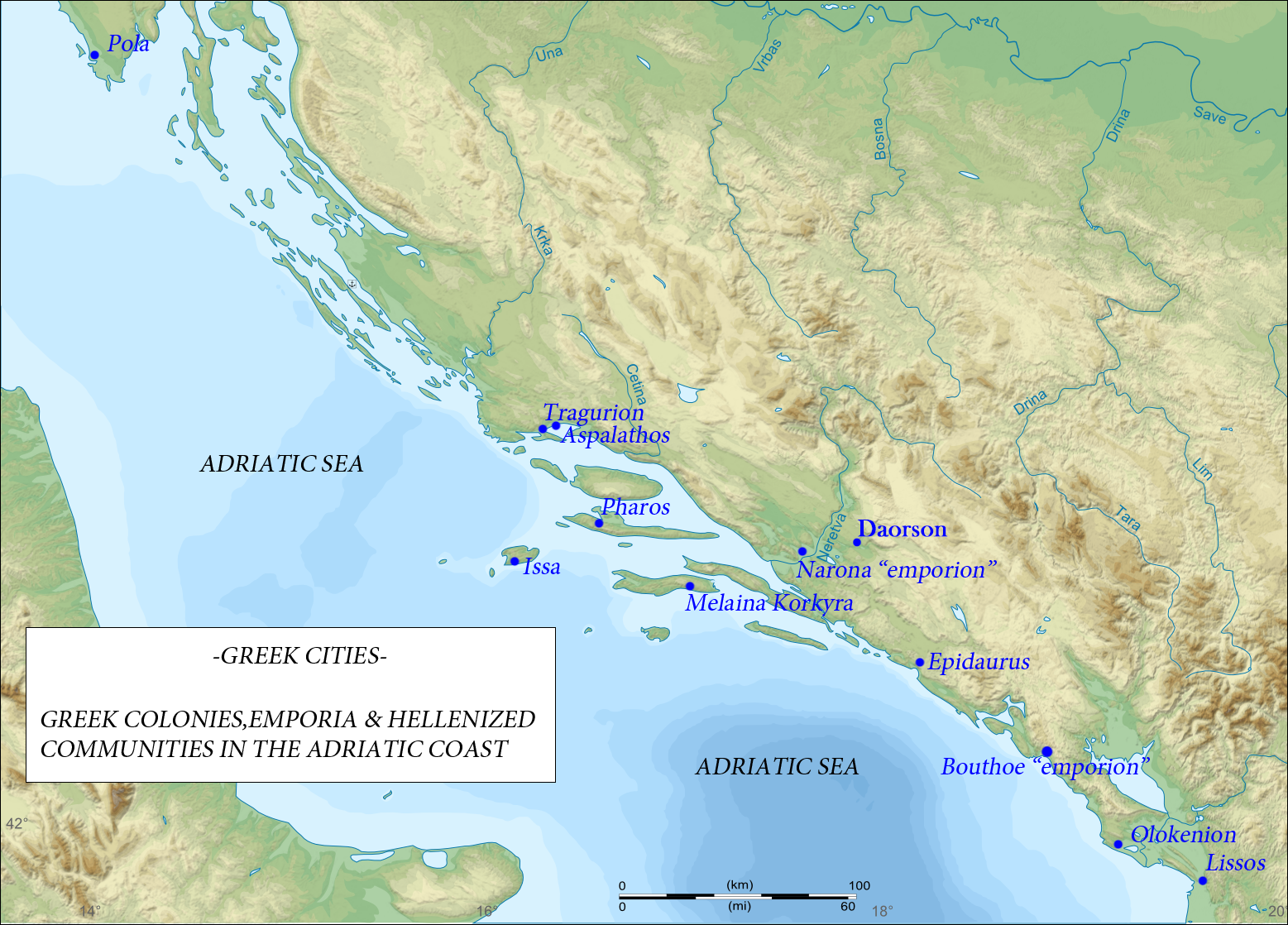
Greek Colonies, emporia and Hellenised communities on the eastern Adriatic coast

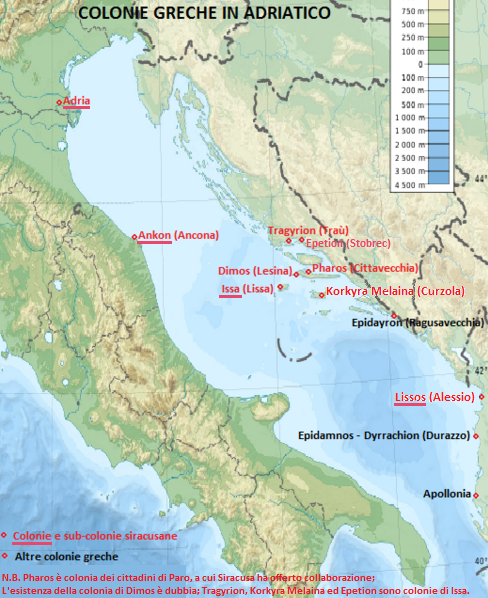
Greek colonies in the Adriatic - in red: Syracusan colonies

The region of the Ionian Sea and that of Illyria were colonised strictly by Corinth. The Corinthians founded important overseas colonies on the sea lanes to Southern Italy and the west which succeeded in making them the foremost emporia of the western side of the Mediterranean. Important colonies of Corinth included Leucada, Astacus, Anactoreum, Actium, Ambracia, and Corcyra—all in modern-day western Greece.

The Corinthians also founded important colonies in Illyria, which evolved into important cities, Apollonia and Epidamnus, in present-day Albania. The fact that about the 6th century BC the citizens of Epidamnus constructed a Doric-style treasury at Olympia confirms that the city was among the richest of the Ancient Greek world. An ancient account describes Epidamnos as 'a great power and very populated' city. Nymphaeum was another Greek colony in Illyria. The Abantes of Euboea founded the city of Thronion at the Illyria.

=== Colonies of Syracuse in Adriatic Sea ===
In the early 4th century BC the Greek tyrant of Syracuse Dionysius I founded a series of new colonies in the Adriatic: in Italy Ankón (now Ancona, a colony populated in 387 BC by political exiles), and Adrìa (in 385 BC, now Adria); in Dalmatia Issa (now Vis) and in Albania Lissos (in 385 BC, now Lezhë).

In 385 Syracuse also collaborated with Paros in the foundation of Pharos (in 384 BC, now Stari Grad), on the island of Hvar in Croatia. The Syracusan colony of Issa in turn founded in 3rd century BC emporia in Tragyrion (now Trogir), Melaina Korkyra (now Korčula) and Epetion (now Stobreč, a suburb of Split) and used the Greek emporium of Salona.

With this colonization program, Dionysius effectively managed to secure total control over the Adriatic routes that carried Po Valley grain to Greece, thus allowing Syracuse and the whole of Sicily to compete with the Etruscans in this trade.

In 1877 a Greek inscription was discovered in Lumbarda on the eastern tip of the island of Korčula in modern-day Croatia which talks about the founding of another Greek settlement there in the 3rd or 4th century BC, by colonists from Issa. The artifact is known as Lumbarda Psephisma. Evidence of coinage on the Illyrian coast used for trade between the Illyrians and the Greeks can be dated to around the 4th century BC and minted in Adriatic colonies such as Issa and Pharos.

=== Black Sea and Propontis ===
Greek colonies along the Black Sea, marked by their corresponding centuries

Although the Greeks had at one point called the Black Sea shore "inhospitable", according to ancient sources they eventually created 70 to 90 colonies. The colonisation of the Black Sea was led by the Megarans and some of the Ionian cities such as Miletus, Phocaea and Teos. The majority of colonies in the region of the Black Sea and Propontis were founded in the 7th century BC.

Ammianus Marcellinus in the 4th century AD wrote that on the left shore of the Maeotis (modern Sea of Azov) lay the Cherronesus (modern Crimea), which was densely settled with Greek colonies. He emphasized that, as a result, the inhabitants were calm and peaceful, farming the land and living off its produce. In contrast, he described the nearby Tauri tribes as exceptionally cruel and ruthless.

==== The first phase (2nd half of the 7th century BC) ====
In the area of Propontis, the Megarans founded the cities of Astacus in Bithynia, Chalcedonia and Byzantium which occupied a privileged position. Miletus founded Cyzicus and the Phocaeans Lampsacus.

On the western shore of the Black Sea the Megarans founded the cities of Selymbria and a little later, Nesebar. A little farther north in today's Romania the Milesians founded the cities of Histria, Argame and Apollonia.

In the south of the Black Sea the most important colony was Sinope which according to prevailing opinion was founded by Miletus some time around the middle of the 7th century BC. Sinope was founded with a series of other colonies in the Pontic region: Trebizond, Cerasus, Cytorus, Cotyora, Cromne, Pteria, Tium, etc.

Further north from the Danube Delta the Greeks colonised the islet, probably then a peninsula, of Barythmenis (modern Berezan) which evolved into the colony of Borysthenes in the next century.

==== The second phase (6th century BC) ====
The most important colony founded on the southern shore of the Black Sea was a Megaran and Boeotian foundation: Heraclea Pontica in 560–550 BC.

On the north shore of the Black Sea Miletus was the first to start with Pontic Olbia and Panticapaeum (modern Kerch). In about 560 BC the Milesians founded Odessa in the region of modern Ukraine. On the Crimean peninsula (the Greeks then called it Tauric Chersonese or "Peninsula of the Bulls") they founded likewise the cities of Sympheropolis, Nymphaeum and Hermonassa. On the Sea of Azov (Lake Maiotis to the ancients) they founded Tanais (in Rostov), Tyritace, Myrmeceum, Cecrine and Phanagoria, the last being a colony of the Teians.

On the eastern shore, which was known in ancient times as Colchis, today in Georgia and the autonomous region of Abkhazia, the Greeks founded the cities of Phasis and Dioscouris. The latter was called Sebastopolis by the Romans and Byzantines and is known today as Sokhumi.

Heraclea Pontica founded Callatis on the southern coast of Romania at the end of the 6th century BC.

==== Later colonies ====
Only a few colonies were founded during the Greek Classical period which included Mesembria (modern Nessebar) by the Megareans in 493 BC. Heraclea Pontica founded Chersonesus Taurica in Crimea at the end of the 5th or early 4th century BC.

The ancient Greek settlement called Manitra of the 4th–3rd centuries BC near the town of Baherove in Crimea was discovered in 2018.

=== Wider Mediterranean ===
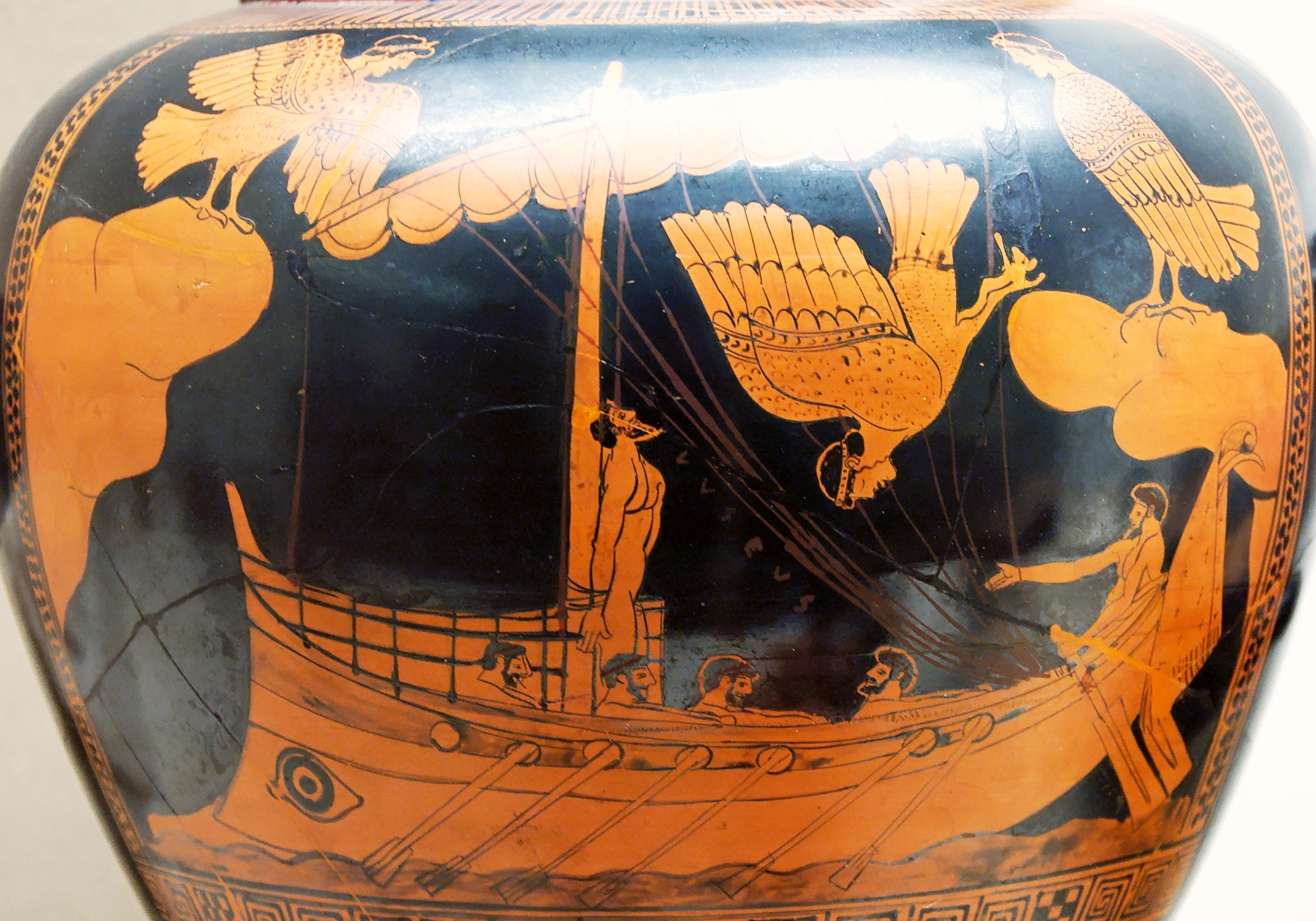
Legendary Greek king Odysseus on the island of sirens; the Odyssey typifies the particulars of the age.

The Greek colonies expanded as far as the Iberian Peninsula and North Africa.

==== Africa ====
In North Africa, on the peninsula of Kyrenaika, colonists from Thera founded Kyrene, which evolved into a very powerful city in the region. Other colonies in Kyrenaika later included Barca, Euesperides (modern Benghazi), Taucheira, and Apollonia.

By the middle of the 7th century, the lone Greek colony in Egypt had been founded, Naukratis. The pharaoh Psammitecus I gave a trade concession to Milesian merchants for one establishment on the banks of the Nile, founding a trading post which evolved into a prosperous city by the time of the Persian expedition to Egypt in 525 B.C. Strabo also mentions a Milesian fortress near the Bolbitine mouth, close to a place known as the Watchtower of Perseus. This watchtower is also mentioned by Herodotus.

2023 archaeological findings in Thonis-Heracleion at Egypt, suggested that Greeks, who were already allowed to trade in the city, "had started to take root" there as early as during the Twenty-sixth Dynasty of Egypt and that likely Greek mercenaries were employed to defend the city.

Diodorus Siculus mentions Meschela (Μεσχέλα), a city on the northern coast of Africa, founded by the Greeks after the Trojan War.

In Cirta, King Micipsa of Numidia established a Greek colony within the city.

==== Asia ====
At the mouth of the Orontes River at the site of Al-Mina along the Syrian coast, a Greek trading colony, of unknown name, was established by the Euboeans around 825 B.C. Nearby, Cape Basit had also Greek presence from the similar period and is almost certainly the location of the colony of Posideion. Additionally, archaeological evidence suggests that the Greeks established a settlement at Tell Sukas around the same time they arrived at Al Mina.

Archaeological discoveries of Greek findings as early as the ninth century BC across the Near East indicate a Greek presence in the region. Finds at sites such as Hamath, Samaria, Nineveh, Tell Abu Hawam and others suggest active trade, cultural exchange, and possibly Greek settlement.

==== Rest of the Mediterranean ====
On the north side of the Mediterranean, the Phokaians founded Massalia on the coast of Gaul. Massalia became the base for a series of further foundations farther away in the region of Spain. Phokaia also founded Alalia in Corsica and Olbia in Sardinia. The Phokaians arrived next on the coast of the Iberian peninsula. As related by Herodotus, a local king summoned the Phokaians to found a colony in the region and rendered meaningful aid in the fortification of the city. The Phokaians founded Empuries in this region and later the even more distant Hemeroskopeion.

== Index of Greek colonies before Alexander the Great (pre-336 BC) ==
=== Modern Albania ===
AL1. Nymphaeum AL2. Epidamnos AL3. Apollonia AL4. Aulon AL5. Chimara AL6. Bouthroton AL7. Oricum AL8. Thronion

=== Modern Arabia ===
AR1. Gerrha

=== Modern Bulgaria ===
BUL1. Mesembria BUL2. Odessos BUL3. Apollonia / Antheia BUL4. Agathopolis BUL5. Kavarna BUL6. Pomorie BUL7. Naulochos BUL8. Krounoi BUL9. Pistiros BUL10. Anchialos BUL11. Bizone (Note: Pseudo-Scymnus writes that some say that the city of Bizone belongs to the barbarians, while others to be a Greek colony of Mesembria.) BUL12. Develtos BUL13. Heraclea Sintica BUL14. Beroe

=== Modern Croatia ===
C1. Salona C2. Tragyrion C3. Aspálathos C4. Epidaurus C5. Issa C6. Dimos C7. Pharos C8. Kórkyra Mélaina C9. Epidaurum C10. Narona C11. Lumbarda C.12 Epetion

=== Modern Cyprus ===
CY1. Chytri CY2. Kyrenia CY3.Golgi

=== Modern Egypt ===
E1. Naucratis

=== Modern France ===
F1. Agde F2. Massalia F3. Tauroentium/Tauroeis F4. Olbia F5. Nicaea F6. Monoikos F7. Antipolis F8. Alalia F9. Rhodanousia F10. Athenopolis F11. Pergantium

=== Modern Georgia ===
G1. Apsaros G2. Bathys G3. Phasis G4. Gyenos G5. Dioscurias G6. Pityus G7.Triglite

=== Modern Greece ===
GR1. Potidaea GR2. Stageira GR3. Acanthus GR4. Mende GR5. Ambracia GR6. Corcyra GR7. Maroneia GR8. Krinides GR9. Olynthus GR10. Abdera GR11. Therma GR12. Arethusa GR13. Leucas GR14. Eion GR15. Sane GR16. Amphipolis GR17. Argilus GR18. Sane GR19. Akanthos GR20. Astacus GR21. Galepsus GR22. Oesyme GR23. Phagres GR24. Datus GR25. Stryme GR26. Pistyrus GR27. Rhaecelus GR28. Dicaea GR29. Methoni GR30. Heraclea in Trachis GR31. Heraclea in Acarnania GR32. Anactorium GR33. Sale GR34. Drys GR35. Toroni GR36. Amorgos GR37. Actium GR38. Scabala GR39. Philippi GR40. Colonides GR41. Oliarus GR42. Potidaea GR43. Thera GR44. Myrcinus GR45. Tarphe GR46. Sollium GR47. Proschium GR48. Ambracia

=== Modern Italy ===
I1. Olbia I2. Adria I3. Ancona I4. Megaris I5. Cumae I6. Procida I7. Dicaearchia I8. Neapolis I9. Poseidonia I10. Metapontum I11. Sybaris I12. Thurii I13. Taras I14. Siris I15. Crotona I16. Gallipoli, Apulia I17. Hyele/Elea I18. Messina I19. Kale Akte I20. Syracuse I21. Didyme I22. Hycesia I23. Phoenicusa I24. Therassía I25. Lipara/Meligounis I26. Epizephyrian Locris I27. Rhegium I28. Lentini I29. Selinountas I30. Megara Hyblaea I31. Naxos I32. Tauromenium I33. Acragas I34. Himera I35. Gela I36. Catania I37. Leontini I38. Ereikousa I39. Euonymos I40. Kamarina I41. Medma I42. Hipponion I43. Heraclea Minoa I44. Caulonia I45. Trotilon I46. Pyxous I47. Mylae I48. Laüs I49. Terina I50. Rhegion I51. Tindari I52. Macalla I53. Temesa I54. Metauros I55. Krimisa I56. Chone I57. Saturo I58. Heraclea Lucania, Siris I59. Scylletium I60. Agathyrnum I61. Adranon I62. Akrillai I63. Casmenae I64. Akrai I65. Engyon I66. Thapsos I67. Pithekoussai I68. Castelmezzano I69. Licata I70. Ortygia I71. Lagaria I72. Hydrus I73. Mactorium I74. Helorus I75. Petelia I76. Satyrion I77. Xiphonia I78. Pandosia (Bruttium) I79. Klampeteia

=== Modern Libya ===
L1. Barce L2. Cyrene L3. Balagrae L4. Taucheira L5. Ptolemais L6. Euesperides L7. Antipyrgus L8. Apollonia L9. Cinyps L10. Menelai Portus

=== Modern Montenegro ===
M1. Bouthoe

=== Modern North Macedonia ===
NMA1. Damastion (Note: Some historians believe that it was near the modern Resen (North Macedonia) while another believe that it was near the modern Vranje (Serbia).) NMA2. Heraclea Lyncestis

=== Modern Palestine (Gaza Strip) ===
PA1. Anthedon (Palestine), probably a colony of Anthedon (Boeotia) from c. 520 BCE

=== Modern Romania ===
RO1. Tomis RO2. Histria/Istros RO3. Aegyssus RO4. Stratonis RO5. Axiopolis RO6. Kallatis

=== Modern Russia ===
RU1. Tanais RU2. Kepoi RU3. Phanagoria RU4. Bata RU5. Gorgippia RU6. Hermonassa RU7. Korokondame RU8. Taganrog RU9. Tyramba RU10. Patraeus RU11. Torikos RU12. Sindikos harbor RU13. Patous

=== Modern Serbia ===
SE1. Damastion (Note: Some historians believe that it was near the modern Resen (North Macedonia) while another believe that it was near the modern Vranje (Serbia).)

=== Modern Spain ===
S1. Portus Illicitanus S2. Akra Leuke S3. Alonis S4. Hemeroscopeum S5. Zakynthos S6. Salauris S7. Rhode S8. Emporion S9. Kalathousa S10. Mainake S11. Menestheus's Limin S12. Kypsela S13. Helike

=== Modern Syria ===
SY1. Posidium SY2. Tell Sukas

=== Modern Turkey ===
TR1. Selymbria TR2. Heraclea Pontica TR3. Cius TR4. Ephesus TR5. Dios Hieron TR6. Iasos TR7. Myndus TR8. Selge TR9. Priene TR10. Halicarnassus TR11. Miletus TR12. Tralles TR13. Phaselis TR14. Aspendos TR15. Side TR16. Sillyon TR17. Zephyrion TR18. Kelenderis TR19. Mallus TR20. Amos TR21. Byzantium TR22. Amaseia TR23. Amastris TR24. Ainos TR25. Berge TR26. Perinthos TR27. Cardia TR28. Chalcedon TR29. Nicomedia TR30. Abydos TR31. Sestos TR32. Lampsacus TR33. Panormos TR34. Cyzicus TR35. Ilion TR36. Sigeion TR37. Sinope TR38. Tirebolu TR39. Amisos TR40. Tripolis TR41. Cotyora TR42. Polemonion TR43. Pharnakia TR44. Kerasous TR45. Trapezous TR46. Themiscyra TR47. Astacus in Bithynia TR48. Assos TR49. Pitane TR50. Phocaea TR51. Smyrna TR52. Pergamon TR53. Teos TR55. Colophon TR56. Patara TR57. Canae TR58. Bargylia TR59. Madytus TR60. Elaeus TR61. Tieion TR62. Apamea Myrlea TR63. Klazomenai TR64. Notion TR65. Parion TR66. Heraion Teichos TR67. Bisanthe TR68. Erythrae TR69. Priapus TR70. Alopeconnesus TR71. Limnae TR73. Crithote TR74. Pactya TR75. Perinthus TR76. Tium TR77. Teichiussa TR78. Triopium TR79. Placia TR80. Scylace TR81. Arisba TR82. Apollonia TR83. Apollonia ad Rhyndacum TR84. Myrina TR85. Pythopolis TR86. Cytorus TR87. Armene TR88. Kolonai TR89. Paesus TR90. Scepsis TR91. Myus TR92. Mallus TR93. Mopsus TR94. Caryanda TR95. Athenae TR96. Syrna TR97. Cyme TR98. Marathesium TR99. Chrysopolis TR100. Neonteichos TR101. Artace TR102. Cobrys TR104. Cypasis TR105. Kydonies TR106. Coryphas TR107. Heraclea (Aeolis) TR108. Gargara TR109. Lamponeia TR110. Elaea TR111. Mariandyn TR112. Claros TR113. Knidos TR114. Prusias ad Hypium TR115. Dardanus TR116. Pygela TR117. Temnos TR118. Gryneium TR119. Aigai TR120. Rhoiteion TR121. Cadrema TR122. Daminon Teichos TR123. Hydrela TR124. Athymbra TR125. Carussa TR126. Termera TR127. Hamaxitus TR128. Mastya TR129.Nagidos TR130. Al-Mina TR131. Agoresos TR132. Perperene TR133. Neandreia TR134. Aianteion TR135. Becheirias TR136. Jasonia TR137. Odeinios TR138. Holmoi TR139. Stameneia TR140. Cebrene/Cebren

=== Modern Ukraine ===
U1. Borysthenes U2. Tyras U3. Olbia U4. Nikonion U5. Odessa U6. Panticapaeum U7. Nymphaion U8. Tyritake U9. Theodosia U10. Chersonesus U11. Charax U12. Myrmekion U13. Kerkinitis U14. Kimmerikon U15. Kalos Limen U16. Yalita U17. Akra U18. Manitra U19. Gelonus (Note: According to Herodotus, Geloni were originally Greeks who settle away from the coastal emporia among the Budini and their language evolved into half Greek and half Scythian. Pavel Jozef Šafárik wrote that they might be Greeks among the Slavs and Fins (Μιξέλληνες – half Greeks, half barbarians).) U20. Tarpanchi U21. Kytaia U22. Ophiousa

== See also ==
- Iron Age Greek migrations
