= Sinni =

Sinni may refer to:

- Sinni (river), Italy
- Sinni, Oman
- sinni, an Indian food that is used as prasada, a Hindu offering
