= Aianteion =

Aianteion may refer to:

- Aianteion, Salamis, a village on Salamis Island, Greece
- Aianteion (Thrace), a town of ancient Thrace, now in Turkey
- Aianteion (Troad), a town of the ancient Troad, now in Turkey
