= Isabella di Morra =

Italian poet of the Renaissance

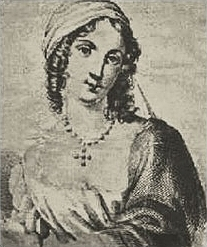
- Alleged portrait of Isabella di Morra
- Born: c. 1520; Favale, Kingdom of Naples
- Died: 1545/1546; Favale, Kingdom of Naples
- Occupation: Poet
- Writing career
- Subjects: Sorrow, loneliness
- Movement: Petrarchism

Isabella di Morra (c. 1520 – 1545/1546) was an Italian poet of the Renaissance. An unknown figure in her lifetime, she was forced by her brothers to live in isolation, which estranged her from courts and literary salons. While living in solitude in her castle, she produced a body of work which did not circulate in the literary milieu of the time. Her brothers eventually murdered her for her suspected secret romance.

Thirteen of her poems have survived. This work is considered among the most powerful and original poetic expressions of Italian literature from the 16th century, employing topics and techniques which make her a forerunner of Romantic poetry.

== Biography ==
=== Early life ===
Isabella di Morra was born into a noble family in Favale (now Valsinni, in the province of Matera), at the time part of the Kingdom of Naples. She was the daughter of Giovanni Michele di Morra, baron of Favale, and Luisa Brancaccio, a noblewoman belonging to a Neapolitan family. Her birthdate is uncertain: generally, reference is made to the study by Benedetto Croce which puts it around 1520, although she could have been born earlier, about 1515 or 1516.

As a child, Isabella was educated in literature and poetry by her father. She, her mother and her siblings (five brothers: Marcantonio, Scipione, Decio, Cesare, Fabio, and one sister: Porzia) were abandoned by Giovanni Michele in 1528, when he was forced to seek refuge in France after having supported the invading French army against the Spanish monarch Charles V for the conquest of the Kingdom of Naples. He could have returned to Favale as his crime against the Spanish crown was pardoned, but he remained in France serving in the army and as a counsellor of Francis I as well as attending court festivities. The youngest child, Camillo, was born after he left.

Scipione followed his father shortly afterwards, and the eldest sibling Marcantonio then took over power in Favale. Isabella grew up in a hostile family environment, with a helpless mother and brothers who were uncouth, unruly and brutish. She was deeply affected by the sudden departure of her father, which tormented her for the rest of her life. She was given a tutor who guided her in the study of Petrarch and Latin poets, and was probably the only person with whom she could talk about literature.

=== Youth ===
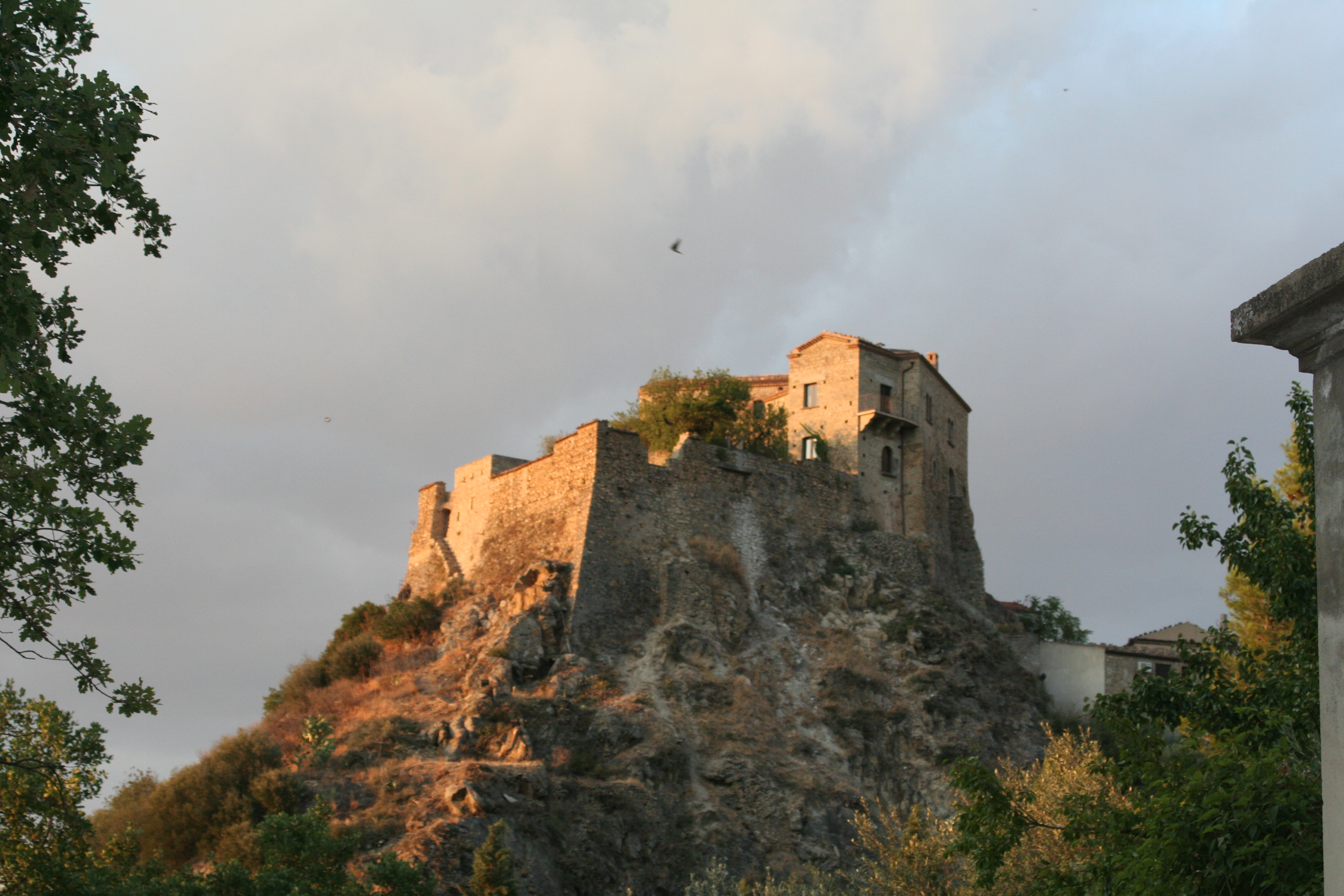
Castle of Isabella di Morra in Favale (now Valsinni)

From the beginning, animosity marked the relationship between Isabella and her three younger brothers Cesare, Decio and Fabio, who perhaps envied their gifted sister and the attention lavished on her education. They forced her to live in strict isolation in the family castle of Favale, perched on a steep cliff above the Ionian Sea. In the castle Isabella dedicated herself to writing poems, finding in poetry the only solace for her solitude.

Nonetheless, she had the opportunity to befriend her learned neighbours: Diego Sandoval de Castro, baron of Bollita (the present-day Nova Siri) and castellan of Cosenza, and his wife Antonia Caracciolo. Of Spanish heritage, Diego, described as a handsome and brave soldier who fought for Charles V's army in the Algiers expedition, was a published poet, member of the Florentine Academy and well connected to the power structure in Naples being a protégé of Viceroy Pedro de Toledo. Perhaps encouraged and helped by her tutor, Isabella and Diego began a secret correspondence, when he began to send her letters in the name of his wife with some poems enclosed, to which Isabella might have answered.

Rumours about a hidden liaison began to emerge, although their relationship remains a mystery and it is unclear whether or not they were more than just friends. Except for a brief reference to marriage, the surviving work of Isabella includes no love poem addressed to a man, while Diego's lyrics described his feelings towards his beloved, possibly referring to a specific woman, or simply conventional laments, following the poetic style of the era. Isabella's brothers, after being informed of the letters, suspected an extra-marital affair and, in order to redeem the family honour, prepared a punishment.

=== Death ===
The first victim was her tutor, who carried the letters between them. Next they confronted Isabella, and she was found with the letters in her hands according to the reports of the time. She was stabbed to death. Two of the brothers escaped to France, but they soon returned with the evident intention of concluding their revenge against Diego, who, fearing for his life, hired a bodyguard. The three assassins, with the help of two uncles and probably fuelled by hatred against Spaniards, killed him in the woods near Noja (today known as Noepoli) several months later.

The death of Isabella went almost unnoticed and was even approved by society according to the code of honour of the 16th century, and Diego Sandoval's murder was hardly investigated. Her year of death is not known with certainty, but it was most likely 1545 or 1546, though other studies suggest she died in 1547 or 1548. It is believed that she was buried in the local church of San Fabiano, but no grave and no trace leading to her have been found. While visiting Valsinni, Croce tried to discover Isabella's tomb but renovations in the church had destroyed all traces of the di Morra family burials, and his exploration behind an underground wall revealed only heaps of bones.

=== Aftermath ===
The murderers were forced to flee the Kingdom of Naples to escape the wrath of the Viceroy Pedro de Toledo, who ordered that the whole province be scoured. They joined their father in France, who allegedly died shortly after the tragedy, as he was still living and receiving a pension in 1549. They were judged guilty in absentia. Scipione, although shocked and disgusted by the murders, resigned himself to helping his brothers. Decio became a priest, and Cesare married a French noblewoman but there is no certain information about Fabio. Scipione, who was secretary to Queen Catherine de' Medici, was later fatally poisoned by other court members who were envious of him.

Meanwhile, the remaining brothers were taken to trial. Marcantonio, who did not take part in the conspiracy, was imprisoned for some months and then released. The youngest brother, Camillo, who also had nothing to do with the murders, was absolved of complicity.

== Poetry ==
The poems of Isabella were discovered when the authorities entered her estate to investigate the murder. There are ten sonnets and three poems, which were published posthumously. She has been associated with the 1500s literary movement known as Petrarchism, a revival of Petrarch's model launched by Pietro Bembo. Although her form, vocabulary and phrases follow the Petrarchist fashion of the period, she is distinguished by her gloomy and distressing tone, possibly influenced by medieval poets such as Dante Alighieri (especially the Inferno chapter and Rime Petrose lyrics) and Jacopone da Todi. Her poetry is very personal, influenced by her own family condition and forced isolation; she wrote on impulse in order to vent her frustration, without any literary adornment or formal elegance.

Unlike other women's poems, which are principally based on a celebration of idealized love, in Isabella's work there is only space for existential pain, grudge and loneliness, making her a distinctive figure among Petrarchist poets of the time. Marriage is the only way to love, which would not only satisfy her social and feminine position, but would be the only way to escape the oppressive environment she lived in. Her poetry describes the grief she feels at being isolated, being separated from other literary people, and missing her father, with Nature as the primary interlocutor of her verses.

Isabella herself defined her style as "bitter, harsh and sorrowful" (amaro, aspro e dolente) or "unmannered and frail" (ruvido e frale). Fortune is the main antagonist of her work, blamed for depriving her of happiness and freedom. Fortune is her personification of mankind's cruelty towards "every good-natured heart" (ogni ben nato core), implicitly condemning a world in which tyranny and violence prevail over virtue.

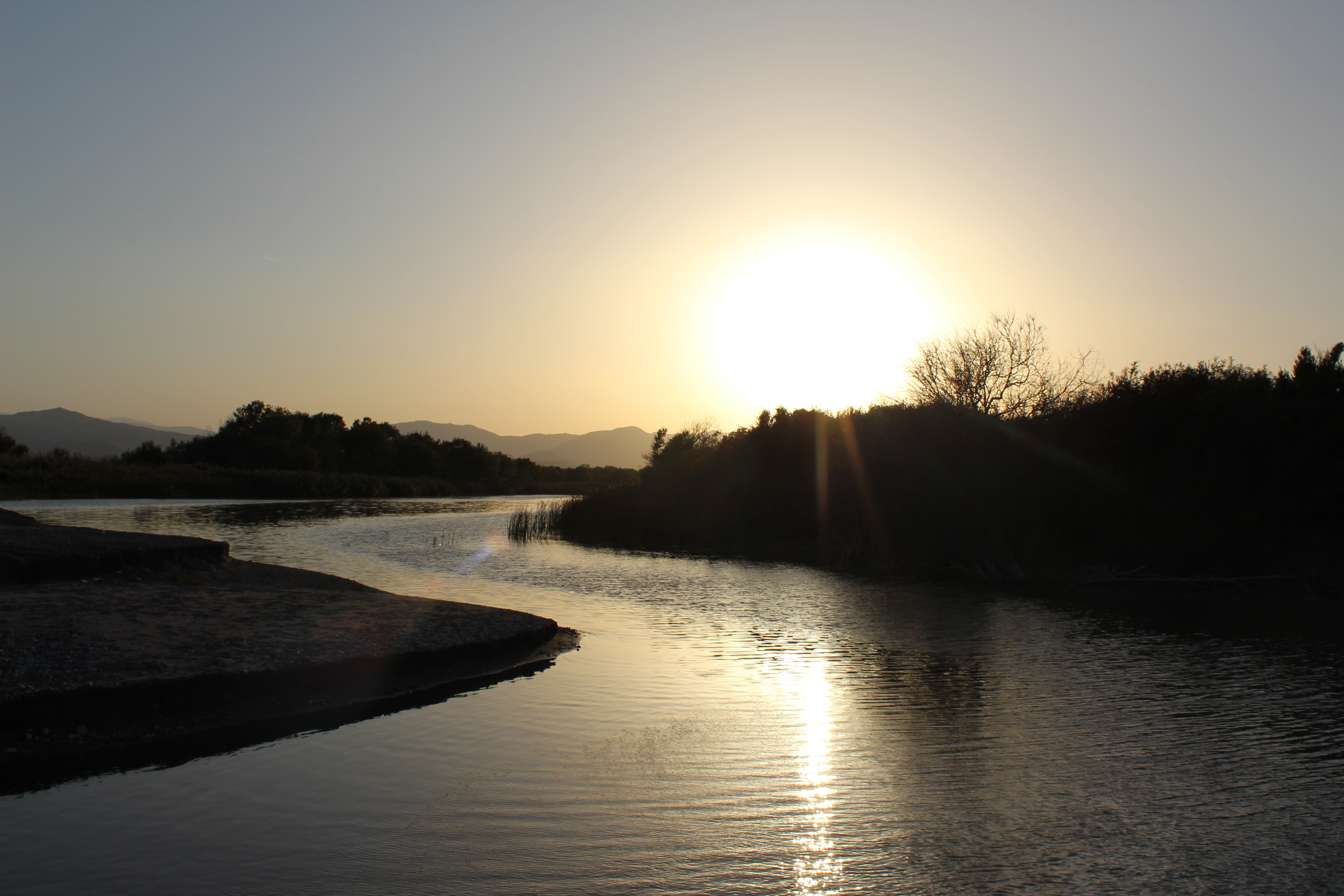
The Sinni river at sunset

She expresses repugnance towards her homeland, described as an "infernal valley" (valle inferna) and "cursed place" (denigrato sito), surrounded by "lonely and dark woods" (selve erme ed oscure), inhabited by "irrational people, without intelligence" (gente irrazional, priva d'ingegno), and crossed by the "turbid Siri" (torbido Siri, today known as Sinni) the river running in the valley below her castle, whose continuous murmur as it flowed downstream into the sea increases her sense of isolation and despair. She imagines throwing herself symbolically into her loved and hated river, perhaps alluding to suicide. This has led to the singular theory that her sister Porzia and Diego Sandoval were corresponding and then became victims of the murderers; accordingly, Isabella, affected by the tragedy, threw herself into the river, since there is no clue as to where she might have been buried.

She scans the sea waiting for a ship to bring good news about her exiled father (who lived comfortably in France, ignoring her fate), in the vain hope that her condition would improve with his return. Charles V (known as "Caesar" in the lyrics) is accused of "preventing a father from helping his daughter" (privar il padre di giovar la figlia) and Francis I is the "great king" (gran re), to whom all hopes for her own liberation were addressed, but they were shattered as the French monarch was finally defeated by his rival, making Isabella even more depressed. Her mother is portrayed as an old and miserable woman unable to control her children; her brothers are "extremely and disgustingly indolent" (in estrema ed orrida fiacchezza) blaming Fortune for depriving them of the kindly nature enjoyed by their ancestors and explaining their uncouth and despotic manners by saying: "by those who, through ignorance, do not understand me, I am, alas, reproached" (da chi non son per ignoranza intesa i' son, lassa, ripresa).

She also paid tribute to the poet Luigi Alamanni, who took refuge in France after a conspiracy against Cardinal Giulio de' Medici, later Pope Clement VII. She writes about her "pitiful end" (miserando fine) and "now that I feel my bitter end near" (or ch’io sento da presso il fine amaro), which leads one to think she was aware of her imminent murder, or perhaps waiting for the natural course of her sad existence. In the last compositions she finds consolation in Jesus Christ and the Virgin Mary, through whom she seems to have finally accepted her painful existence and tried to find peace of mind, apparently reconciling herself to the land she once despised. Her final hope is to see herself "totally freed from the stormy terrestrial cloud, and among the blessed souls" (sgombrata tutta dal terrestre nembo, e fra l’alme beate).

== Legacy ==
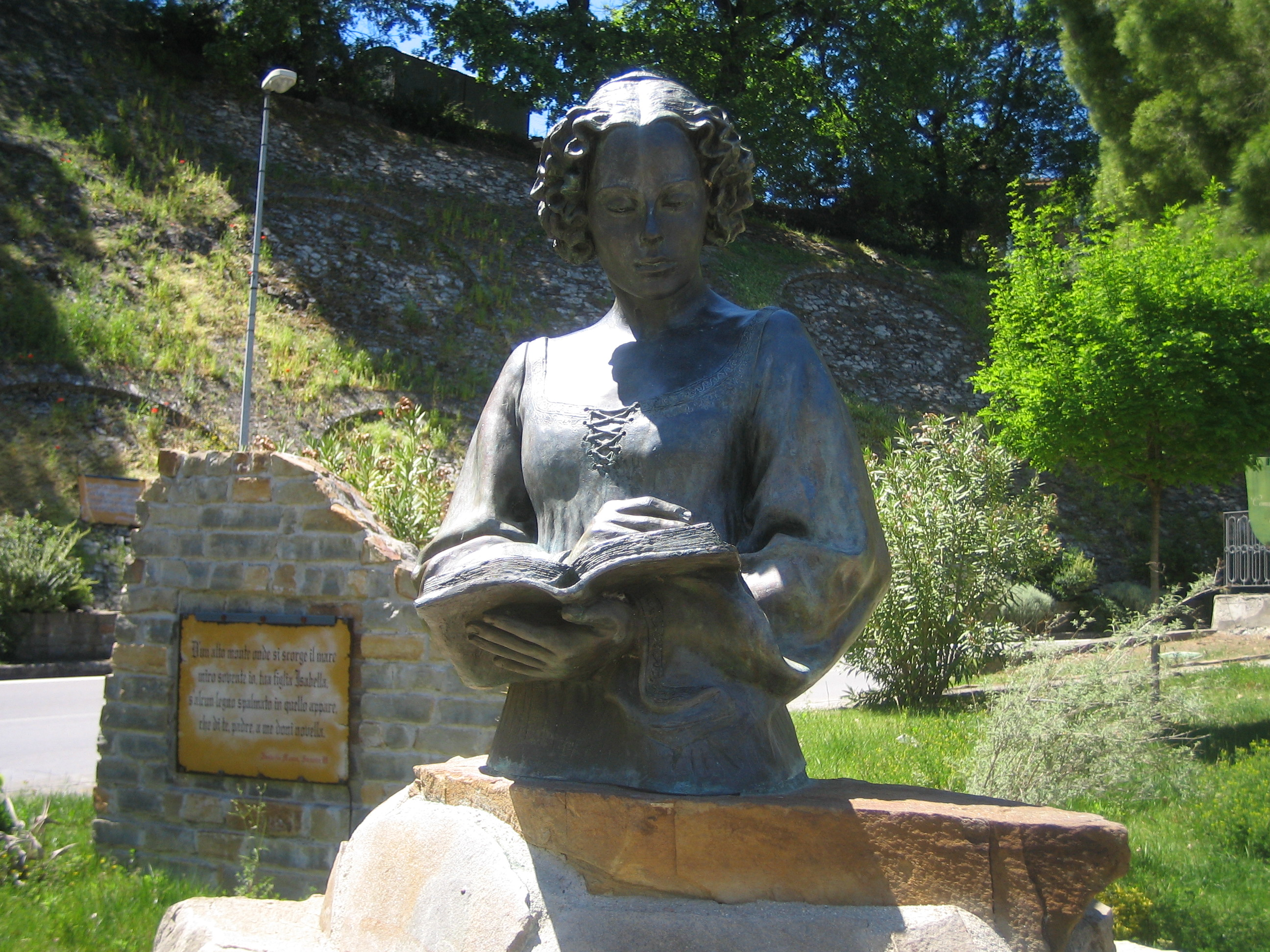
Statue of Isabella di Morra in Valsinni

A few years after her death, the verses began to circulate in Naples and were read with pity and admiration, and then sent to Venice, where some of her poetry appeared in Book 3 of Lodovico Dolce's anthology, Rime di diversi illustri signori napoletani e d'altri nobilissimi intelletti (Verses of several esteemed Neapolitan gentlemen and other most noble intellects) in 1552. The entire production was later included in Lodovico Domenichi's Rime diverse d’alcune nobilissime, et virtuosissime donne ( Verses by some most noble and virtuous women) in 1559. In 1629, her nephew Marcantonio, son of Camillo, published a family biography entitled Familiae nobilissimae de Morra historia (History of the most noble di Morra family), giving details regarding her life and death which were unknown until its release.

Despite her work being later included in other anthologies, Isabella was almost forgotten and ignored by critics over the centuries. After a long period of silence, which lasted until the beginning of the 20th century, she was rediscovered by Angelo De Gubernatis in 1901, while attending a conference about literature in Bologna. In 1907, De Gubernatis published Isabella Morra. Le rime (Isabella Morra. The Verses), including annotations and an introductory biography of Isabella drawn from her nephew's monograph. But it was Benedetto Croce who released her first historically documented biography and provided a critical essay, re-evaluating her place in Italian literature. Croce praised her poetry for its "passionate immediacy" and "immersion in emotion", very different from the prevailing style of that time, which he considered "precious and artificial".

According to Paul F. Grendler's Encyclopedia of the Renaissance in association with The Renaissance Society of America, her work is an "impressive prefigurement of Romanticism" and he states: "no other poet prior to Isabella di Morra infused such personal depth into poetry, bringing new drama to the lyric precisely because it so closely addresses the tragic circumstances of her life", contributing "to the development of a new sensibility in poetic language, one grounded in a kind of life writing that raises the biographical, the political, the familial, and the personal to a genuinely lyric stature". She is cited as a precursor to Giacomo Leopardi due to similar themes, feelings and life experiences. Her poetry is also considered a possible influence on Torquato Tasso as it is eerily echoed in his poem Canzone al Metauro (A Poem for Metauro, 1578).

== In popular culture ==
Isabella has been portrayed by Anny Duperey in the eponymous drama performed at the Théâtre d'Orsay, Paris, on 23 April 1974. It was written by André Pieyre de Mandiargues and directed by Jean-Louis Barrault.

A literary site named after her was established in her hometown of Valsinni in 1993, where theatrical and musical performances take place.

The theatrical work Storia di Isabella di Morra raccontata da Benedetto Croce (The story of Isabella di Morra as told by Benedetto Croce) by Dacia Maraini was staged in Valsinni (1999) and Rome (2000).

The Io Isabella International Film Week festival is dedicated to her memory.

Isabella is featured in the dark fantasy visual novel A Tithe in Blood. The main character studies her poetry in university and discovers some fictional works of hers related to the occult.

== Works ==
=== Sonnets ===
- I fieri assalti di crudel fortuna (The fierce assaults of cruel Fortune)
- Sacra Giunone, se i volgari cuori (Sacred Juno, if vulgar hearts)
- D'un alto monte onde si scorge il mare (From a high mountain revealing the sea)
- Quanto pregiarti puoi, Siri mio amato (Take, my beloved Siri, great pride)
- Non solo il ciel vi fu largo e cortese (Not only was heaven generous and courteous to you)
- Fortuna che sollevi in alto stato (Fortune, you who raise to high condition)
- Ecco ch'una altra volta, o valle inferna (Yet one more time, O infernal valley)
- Torbido Siri, del mio mal superbo (Turbid Siri, proud of my ills)
- Se alla propinqua speme nuovo impaccio (If to the approaching hope a new obstacle)
- Scrissi con stile amaro, aspro e dolente (I wrote with a bitter, harsh and sorrowful style)

=== Songs ===
- Poscia ch'al bel desir troncate hai l'ale (Since you clipped the wings of fine desire)
- Signore, che insino a qui, tua gran mercede (Lord, who up to now, your great mercy)
- Quel che gli giorni a dietro (What in days past)

== See also ==
- Honour killing
- Petrarch
- Romantic poetry
- Sororicide
- Women's quarters in segregated societies

== Bibliography ==
- Grendler, Paul F. (1999). Encyclopedia of the Renaissance: Machiavelli-Petrarchism. Scribner. ISBN 9780684805115. "Encyclopedia of the Renaissance: Machiavelli-Petrarchism."
- Marrone, Gaetana; Puppa, Paolo (2007). Encyclopedia of Italian Literary Studies: A-J. Taylor & Francis. ISBN 9781579583903.
- Jaffe, Irma B.; Colombardo, Gernando (2002). Shining Eyes, Cruel Fortune: The Lives and Loves of Italian Renaissance Women Poets. Fordham University Press. ISBN 9780823221806.
- Robin, Diana; Larsen, Anne R.; Levin, Carole (2007). Encyclopedia of Women in the Renaissance: Italy, France, and England. ABC-CLIO. ISBN 9781851097722.
- Musillo Mitchell, Isabella (1998). Canzoniere: A Bilingual Edition. Bordighera. ISBN 9781884419188.
- Robin, Diana (2007). Publishing Women: Salons, the Presses, and the Counter-Reformation in Sixteenth-Century Italy. University of Chicago Press. ISBN 9780226721569.
- Russell, Rinaldina (1994). Italian Women Writers: A Bio-bibliographical Sourcebook. Greenwood Publishing Group. ISBN 9780313283475.
- Schiesari, Juliana (1992). The Gendering of Melancholia: Feminism, Psychoanalysis, and the Symbolics of Loss in Renaissance Literature. Cornell University Press. ISBN 0801499712.
- Russell, Rinaldina (1997). The Feminist Encyclopedia of Italian Literature. Greenwood Publishing Group. ISBN 9780313294358.
- Cervigni, Dino S. (1992). Images of America and Columbus in Italian Literature. Annali d'Italianistica.
- Scarlatta, Gabriella (2017). The Disperata, from Medieval Italy to Renaissance France. ISD LLC. ISBN 9781580442657.
- Hatzantonis, Emmanuel; Mastri, Augustus A. (1997). The flight of Ulysses: studies in memory of Emmanuel Hatzantonis. Annali d'Italianistica. ISBN 9780965795609.
- Vena, Michael (2013). Italian Playwrights from the Twentieth Century: A Companion Text. Xlibris Corporation. ISBN 9781483633527.
