= Plake =

Plake may refer to:

- Glen Plake (born 1964), American skier
- Hunter Plake (born 1995), American singer and songwriter
- Plake (Mysia), a town of ancient Mysia, Anatolia
