= Limnae =

Limnae or Limnai (Ancient Greek: Λίμναι) may refer to:

- Limnae (Bithynia), an ancient town in Bithynia, now in Turkey
- Limnae (Cappadocia), an ancient town in Cappadocia, now in Turkey
- Limnae (Peloponnesus), an ancient Greek town on the borderlands between Messenia and Laconia
- Limnae (Sparta), an ancient Greek settlement in Sparta
- Limnae (Thrace), an ancient Greek city in Thrace
- Limnae in Pisidia, a former city and bishopric, presently Gaziri in Anatolia and a Latin Catholic titular see

== See also ==
- Limnaea (disambiguation)
