= Colobraro =

- Comune
- Comune di Colobraro
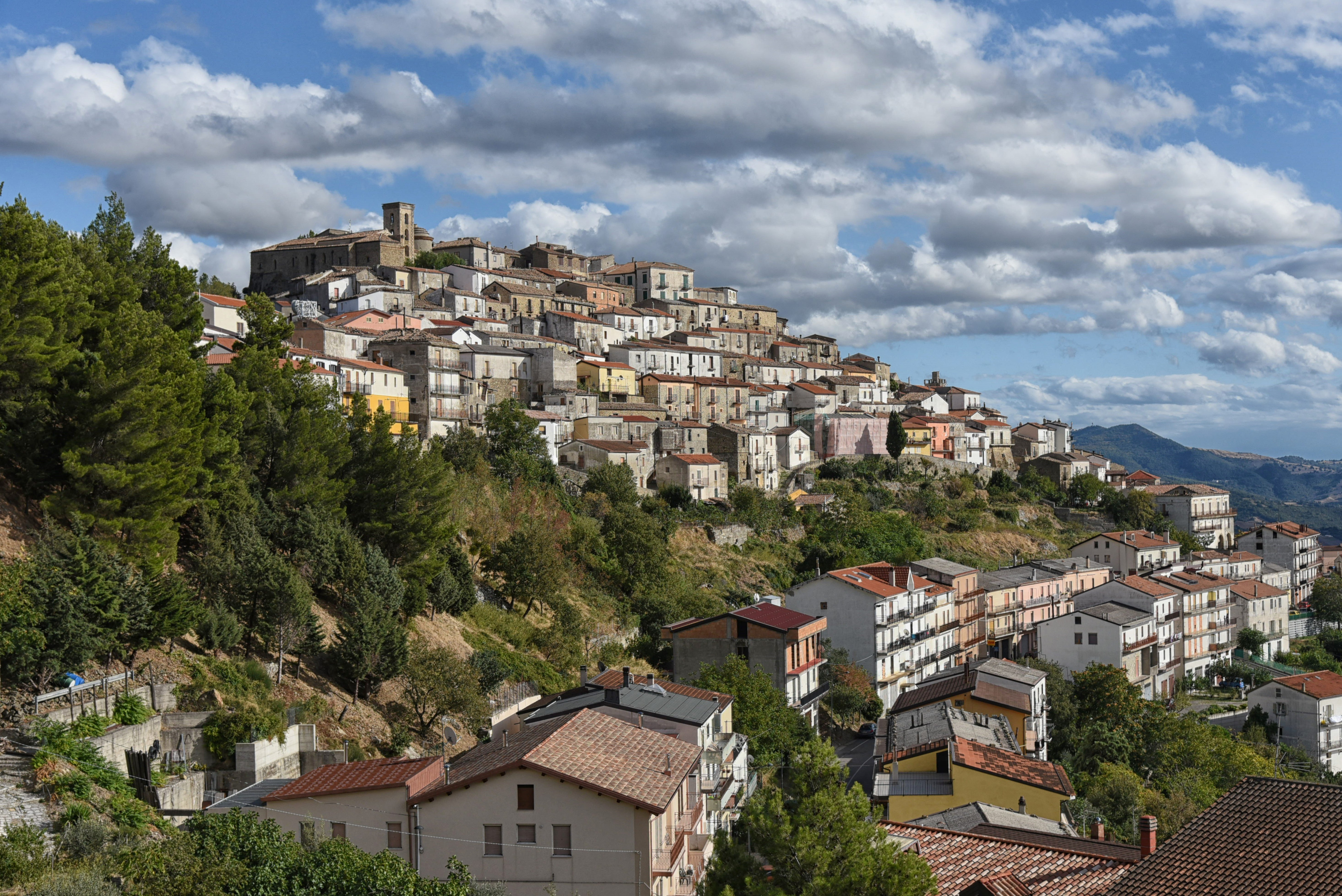
- View of the town

- Coat of arms

- Location within Italy Location within Basilicata
- Coordinates: 40°11′N 16°26′E
- Country: Italy
- Region: Basilicata
- Province: Matera (MT)

Government
  - Mayor: Nicola Lista

Area
  - Total: 65.91 km^{2} (25.45 sq mi)
- Elevation: 630 m (2,070 ft)

Population (December 2017)
  - Total: 1,243
  - Density: 18.86/km^{2} (48.84/sq mi)
- Demonym: Colobraresi
- Time zone: UTC+1 (CET)
  - Summer (DST): UTC+2 (CEST)
- Postal code: 75021
- Dialing code: 0835
- ISTAT code: 077006
- Patron saint: St. Nicholas
- Saint day: 7 May
- Website: Official website

Colobraro (Lucano: Culuvrér) is a town and comune in the province of Matera, in the southern Italian region of Basilicata. The town is positioned on a high hill dominating the valley of the river Sinni, near the town of Valsinni.

== Geography ==
Colobraro is located in southern Italy in the region of Basilicata. It is one of the agricultural centers in the Sinni River valley, located on the southern slopes of Mount Calvario at a height of 630 m, with views of the whole Ionian Sea coast. Colobraro is located near Highway 653, not far from the dam built on the Sinni River and Mount Cotugno. It borders the towns of Valsinni, Tursi, Rotondella, Senise, Sant'Arcangelo and Noepoli. Colobraro is about 80 km from the province's capital of Matera, and about 130 km from the region's capital of Potenza.

== History ==
The hamlet is known as the "village without a name". Its name is considered a bringer of bad luck in the nearby towns, where Colobraro is usually mentioned in the local dialects simply as chillu paese, cudd' puaise or chill' pais, all simply meaning "that village".

The origin of the town's reputation for bringing bad luck stems from a tale in which a successful lawyer, who took on a case in Colobraro, proclaimed that if he were not to win the case, the chandelier in the courthouse should fall. At that exact moment, the chandelier fell and shattered. Since then, the town has been associated with bad luck.

Many stories are told of freak accidents and instances involving masciare, powerful women reputed in southern Italy in the 1950s to cast spells and use black magic, thus fixing Colobraro's reputation for being unlucky and cursed.

Additionally, the name Colobraro derives from the Latin word coluber, meaning serpent, often considered the embodiment of evil.
