= Patraeus =

Patraeus may refer to:

- Patraus, an ancient Paeonian king
- David Petraeus, an American general and politician
- Patraeus (city), an ancient Greek colony at the Black Sea, near the modern village of Garkusha, Russia.
