= Lagaria =

Ancient city in Lucania

Lagaria (Greek: Λαγαρία), was an ancient town of Magna Graecia in Lucania, situated between Thurii and the river Siris (modern Sinni).

According to legend, it was founded by a colony of Phocians under the command of Epeius, the architect of the Trojan Horse. Strabo and Stephanus of Byzantium calls it only a fortress (Φρούριον), and it was probably never a place of any importance; though deriving some celebrity in later times from the excellence of its wine, which was esteemed one of the best in Italy. The statement of Strabo, above quoted, is the only clue to its position, which cannot therefore be determined with any certainty. Cluverius placed it at Nocara, about 16 km from the sea, and this conjecture (for it is nothing more) has been adopted by Romanelli. The editors of the Barrington Atlas of the Greek and Roman World, along with most modern scholars, place the ruins of Lagaria at Monte Coppolo, in the comune of Valsinni, Matera Province, Basilicata. The wines of this neighborhood are said still to preserve their ancient reputation.
