= Limnatis =

Limnatis may refer to:

- Limnatis (leech), a genus of leeches
- Limnatis, Limassol, a village in Cyprus
- Limnatis River, a river in Cyprus discharging into the Kouris Dam
- Limnatis, an epithet of Artemis

== See also ==
- Limnitis, a village in Northern Cyprus
- Limnatides, a type of Greek nymphs
- Limnaea (disambiguation)
