= Placa =

Placa may refer to:

- Placia, a town in ancient Mysia
- Plaquita, a Dominican bat-and-ball game resembling cricket
