= Valsinni =

- Comune
- Comune di Valsinni
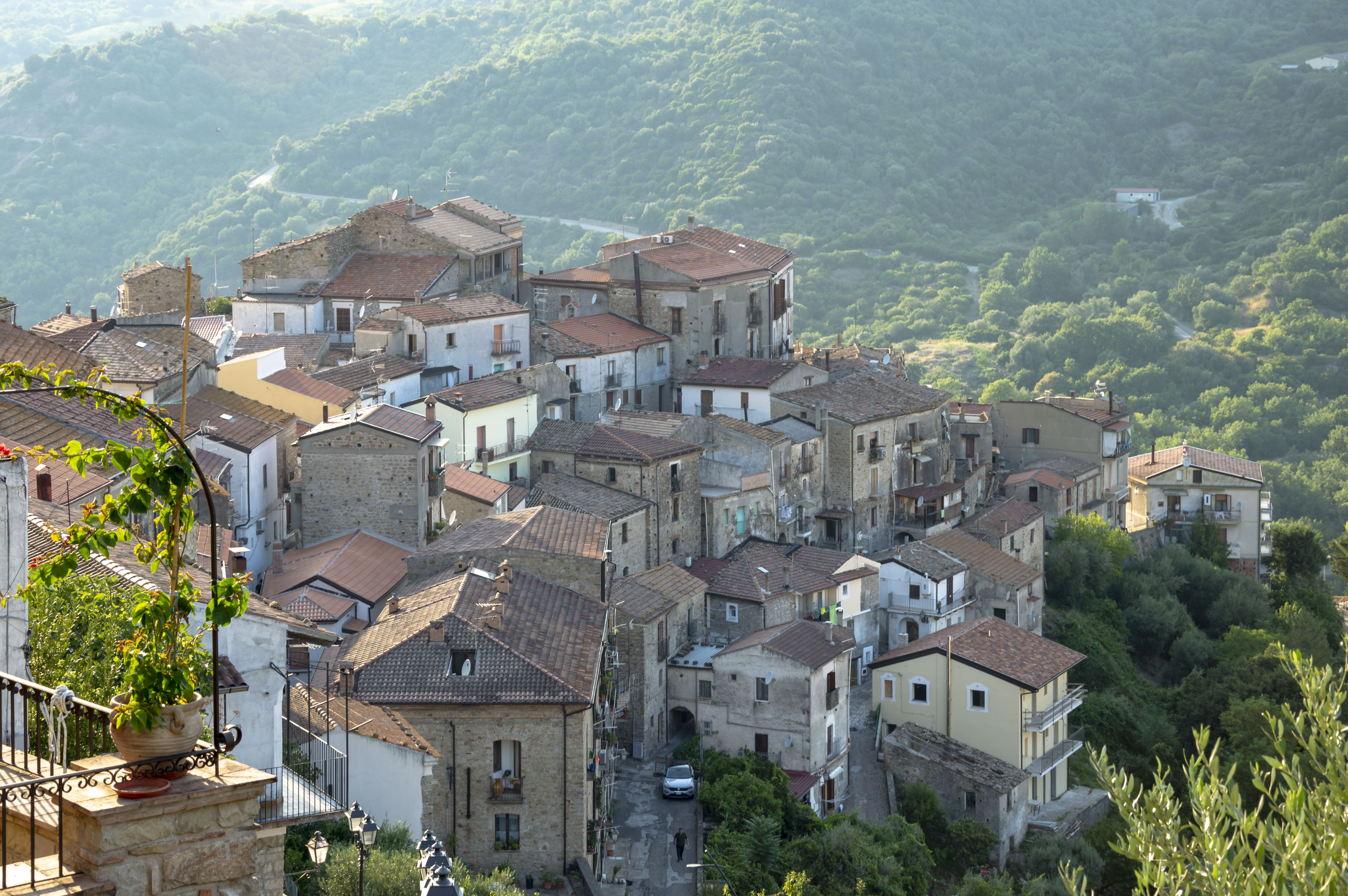
- View of Valsinni

- Coat of arms

- Location within Italy Location within Basilicata
- Coordinates: 40°10′N 16°27′E
- Country: Italy
- Region: Basilicata
- Province: Matera (MT)

Government
  - Mayor: Gennaro Olivieri

Area
  - Total: 31 km^{2} (12 sq mi)
- Elevation: 250 m (820 ft)

Population (2006)
  - Total: 1,708
  - Density: 55/km^{2} (140/sq mi)
- Demonym: Valsinnesi
- Time zone: UTC+1 (CET)
  - Summer (DST): UTC+2 (CEST)
- Postal code: 75029
- Dialing code: 0835
- ISTAT code: 077030
- Patron saint: Saint Fabian, Madonna del Carmine
- Saint day: 10 May, 21 July

Valsinni is a village and comune in the province of Matera, in the Basilicata region of southern Italy.

The village is bordered by Colobraro, Nocara, Noepoli, Nova Siri, Rotondella and San Giorgio Lucano.

== History ==
The territory of the "comune" includes the ruins of the ancient city of Lagaria.

The town was known as Favale San Cataldo until 1873.

== Main sights ==
Sights include:

- the Castle, dating back to the 11th century, where the Italian Renaissance poet Isabella Morra was born, lived and died
- Palazzo Melidoro
- Mother Church, of medieval origins, dedicated to Santa Maria Assunta
- Church of the Annunciation (17th century)

== Economy ==
The town has an ancient tradition of millers, whose symbol is the mill of Palazzo Mauri, which is still supplied with large stone wheels. The economy of the town is mostly based on agriculture and livestock breeding.

== Culture ==
The main festival of Valsinni occurs on 9/10 May, including a religious procession for the patron Saint Fabian. Another event is L'estate di Isabella ("Isabella's Summer"), held every summer in the month of August to honor Renaissance poet Isabella Morra.

== Notable people ==
Isabella di Morra (1520 – 1545/1546), poet
