= Zoltán Spakovszky =

Aerospace engineer

Zoltán S. Spakovszky
- Born: 1972 (age 53–54); Switzerland
- Known for: Turbomachinery; thermodynamics; aeroacoustics; fluid dynamics; gas turbine; propulsion
- Spouse: Wiebke Denecke

Academic background
- Education: ETH Zurich (Ing); MIT (MS, PhD)
- Thesis: Applications of axial and radial compressor dynamic system modeling (2001)

Academic work
- Discipline: Aerospace Engineering
- Institutions: Massachusetts Institute of Technology

Zoltán S. Spakovszky (born 1972) is an aerospace engineer, academic, and researcher. He is best known for his work on fluid system instabilities and internal flow in turbomachinery. He is T. Wilson (1953) Professor in Aeronautics at the Massachusetts Institute of Technology (MIT), and the Director of the MIT Gas Turbine Laboratory.

== Education ==
Spakovszky received his Diplôme d'Ingénieur degree in Mechanical Engineering from the Swiss Federal Institute of Technology (ETH Zurich) in 1997. He then moved to United States and earned a Master of Science degree and doctorate in Aeronautics and Astronautics from MIT in 1999 and 2001, respectively. His dissertation was on dynamic system modeling of axial and radial centrifugal compressors under James D. Paduano.

== Career ==
Following his doctoral studies, Spakovszky joined the Department of Aeronautics and Astronautics at MIT as professorial faculty in 2001. He became the Director of the MIT Gas Turbine Laboratory in 2008.

Spakovszky's research focuses on solving complex, real world, high relevance technological issues related to aeroengines, power and propulsion systems. He has conducted work in compressor aerodynamics, aeroengine instabilities, rotordynamics, thermodynamics, aero-acoustics, propulsion and energy conversion, and aircraft design for environment. He investigated and explained the mechanisms of flow instabilities leading to in-flight aeroengine shutdowns. The results helped improve an engine diagnostic and health monitoring test employed by airlines for fleet management purposes and required by an FAA airworthiness directive. Spakovszky worked as chief engineer on the Silent Aircraft Initiative, a joint project between the University of Cambridge, MIT, and industry partners, that took step beyond aviation industry's noise reduction goals by delivering a credible conceptual aircraft design inaudible on take-off and landing. He also led a team to develop ultra high-speed gas bearings that enabled operation of multi-wafer rotating MEMS machines for power and propulsion applications at micro scale.

Spakovszky is a member of the National Academy of Engineering, a fellow of the American Society of Mechanical Engineers (ASME), an associate fellow of the American Institute of Aeronautics and Astronautics (AIAA), and the leader of the ASME Gas Turbine Segment Leadership Team,

== Awards and honors ==
- 1997 - Georg Fischer Award, ETH Zurich
- 2003 - NASA Group Achievement Award
- 2003 - ASME Melville Medal
- 2009 - Ruth and Joel Spira Award for Excellence in Teaching, Massachusetts Institute of Technology
- 2012 - ASME Gas Turbine Award, International Gas Turbine Institute
- 2016 - ASME John P. Davis Gas Turbine Applications Award
- 2021 - ASME Scholar Award
- 2026 - National Academy of Engineering

== Bibliography ==
- Z. Spakovszky, “Analysis of Aerodynamically Induced Whirling Forces in Axial Flow Compressors”. ASME Journal of Turbomachinery 122, pp. 761 – 768, October 2000.
- Z. Spakovszky "Backward Traveling Rotating Stall Waves in Centrifugal Compressors". ASME Journal of Turbomachinery 126.1 (2004): 1. January 2004.
- Z. Spakovszky, “Stamp of Authenticity”, Mechanical Engineering 128, pp. 8, April 2006.
- V. Lei, Z. Spakovszky, E. Greitzer "A Criterion for Axial Compressor Hub-Corner Stall" Journal of Turbomachinery 130.3 (2008): 031006. January 2008.
- Z. Spakovszky, C. Roduner "Spike and Modal Stall Inception in an Advanced Turbocharger Centrifugal Compressor" Journal of Turbomachinery 131.3 (2009): 031012. January 2009
- Z. Spakovszky, “High-Speed Gas Bearings for Mirco-Turbomachinery “, in Multi-Wafer Rotating MEMS Machines, Lang, J., ed., Springer, MEMS Reference Shelf Series, January 2009.
- A. Peters, Z. Spakovszky, W. Lord, B. Rose "Ultrashort Nacelles for Low Fan Pressure Ratio Propulsors" Journal of Turbomachinery [0889504X] 137.2 (2014): 021001. September 2014.
- G. Pullan, A. Young, I. Day, E. Greitzer, Z. Spakovszky "Origins and Structure of Spike-Type Rotating Stall" Journal of Turbomachinery [0889504X] 137.5 (2015): 051007. May 2015.
- N. Shah, G. Pfeiffer, R. Davis, T. Hartley, Z. Spakovszky, Full-Scale Turbofan Demonstration of a Deployable Engine Air-Brake for Drag Management Applications," J. Eng. Gas Turbines Power. 2017; 139(11):111202-111202-13. August 2017.
- C. Lettieri, D. Paxson, Z. Spakovszky, P. Bryanston-Cross "Characterization of Nonequilibrium Condensation of Supercritical Carbon Dioxide in a de Laval Nozzle" Journal of Engineering for Gas Turbines and Power, 140.4 (2018): 041701, April 2018
- A. Kiss, Z. Spakovszky, “Effects of Transient Heat Transfer on Compressor Stability”, ASME J. Turbomach. 2018; 140(12):121003-121003-9. December 2018.
- Z. Spakovszky, "Advanced Low-Noise Aircraft Configurations and Their Assessment: Past, Present, and Future", CEAS Aeronautical Journal, Volume: 10, Issue Number: 1, April 2019.
