= Nymphaeum (Illyria) =

Ancient harbour in Illyria

Nymphæum or Nymphaion (Ancient Greek: Νυμφαῖον, Νύμφαιον or Νυμφαίη; Latin: Nymphaeum) was an ancient harbour on the coast of Illyria, three miles to the north of Lissus. The site has been identified with the area of modern day Shëngjin, Albania.

Perhaps emerged since the 5th century BC, Nymphaeum would have been presumably one of the earliest Greek colonies on the Albanian coast. The harbor of Nymphaeum was mentioned by Pliny the Elder (23 CE – 79), Lucanus (39 AD – 65 AD), Livy (59 BC – AD 17) and Julius Caesar (100 BC - 44 BC). The harbour was used by Marcus Antonius and his fleet when they arrived in Illyricum during Caesar's Civil War.

== Bibliography ==
- Cabanes, Pierre (2008). "Greek Colonisation in the Adriatic". In Tsetskhladze, Gocha R. (ed.). Greek Colonisation: An Account of Greek Colonies and Other Settlements Overseas. Vol. 2. Brill. pp. 155–186. ISBN 9789047442448.
- Matthews, Monica (2008). Caesar and the Storm: A Commentary on Lucan, De Bello Civili, Book 5, Lines 476-721. Peter Lang. ISBN 978-3039107360.
- Pitassi, Michael (2009). The navies of Rome. Boydell & Brewer. ISBN 978-1843836001.
- Wilkes, J. J. (2000). "Map 49 Illyricum. Compiled by J.J. Wilkes, 1995". In Talbert, Richard J. A. (ed.). Barrington Atlas of the Greek and Roman World: Map-by-map Directory. Vol. 1. Princeton University Press. pp. 749–760. ISBN 0691049459.
