= Stryme =

Coordinates: 40°56′12″N 25°16′56″E

Stryme (Ancient Greek: Στρύμη) was an ancient Greek city on the south coast of ancient Thrace, a little to the west of Mesembria, between which and Stryme flowed the small river Lissus, which the army of Xerxes I is said to have drunk dry. It was founded by colonists from Thasos; but disputes seem to have arisen respecting it between the Thasii and the people of the neighbouring city of Maroneia. In some sources, Stryme is called a Thasian polis bordering on Mesambria, but the account Herodotos provides is contradictory. Stryme was located in the Briantike, a region belonging to the Thracian Kikones.

The location of the site is disputed; but many scholars locate it on the Molyvoti Peninsula near Cape Molyvote about 25 kilometres (16 mi) southwest of Komotini. This site is being investigated by a synergasia between the American School of Classical Studies at Athens, represented by Princeton University, and the 19th Ephorate of Prehistoric and Classical Antiquities (Komotini).

== See also ==
- Greek colonies in Thrace
