= Wiebke Denecke =

German sinologist and japanologist

- Occupations: Literary scholar, author and academic
- Known for: Premodern Literature and Thought of the Sinitic World (China, Japan, Korea); Comparative Studies of East Asia and the Premodern World; World Literature; Comparative Global Humanities; History of Knowledge and History of Diplomacy; Politics of Cultural Heritage and Memory
- Spouse: Zoltán Spakovszky

Academic background
- Education: Georg August University, Göttingen; Harvard University, Cambridge
- Thesis: Mastering Chinese Philosophy: A History of the Genre of Masters Literature Zhuzi Baijia from the Analects to the Han Feizi (2004)

Academic work
- Institutions: Massachusetts Institute of Technology

Wiebke Denecke is a literary scholar, author, and academic who is a professor of East Asian Literatures and the S. C. Fang Chair for Chinese Language and Culture at the Massachusetts Institute of Technology (MIT).

Denecke's research has focused on the classical literatures and philosophical traditions of China, Japan, Korea, and the Greco-Roman world, with interests in early thought traditions, philosophy, persuasion, rhetoric, poetry, poetics, court cultures, comparative studies of the premodern world and world literature. Her publications include The Dynamics of Masters Literature and Classical World Literatures: Sino-Japanese and Greco-Roman Comparisons. With an endowment from Hsin-Mei Agnes Hsu-Tang and Oscar L. Tang, she established The Hsu-Tang Library of Classical Chinese Literature with Oxford University Press and serves as its Founding Editor-in-chief. Furthermore, she has served as Editor of The Norton Anthology of World Literature and The Norton Anthology of Western Literature and co-edits the book series East Asian Comparative Literature and Culture with Satoru Hashimoto and Zhang Longxi.

Throughout her research, Denecke has examined literary traditions within multiliterate and cross-cultural contexts, reinterpreting East Asian traditions for contemporary relevance.

== Education and early career ==
Before college, Denecke was trained in Latin and Greek studies in the humanistic Max-Planck-Gymnasium in Göttingen, and received a French baccalaureate in Paris. She received her academic training in Sinology, Japanology, Korean studies, philosophy, and the history of science, in her native Germany, as well as in Norway, Dalian, Taipei, Tokyo, Seoul, and Boston. She began her academic journey at Georg August University in Göttingen, earning a B.A. in Sinology, philosophy, and the History of Medicine in 1994, while completing medical licensing examinations. She attended medical school and trained as a doctor from 1991 to 1996, while pursuing an M.A. in Sinology, philosophy, History of Medicine, and Japanology. She received her MA from the Georg August University in 1998, and completed her PhD in East Asian Languages and Civilizations at Harvard University in 2004. Denecke has been a fellow of the German Academic Scholarship Foundation and received scholarships during her undergraduate and doctoral studies.

== Career ==
After completing her education, Denecke became a Mellon Fellow at the Society of Fellows in the Humanities at Columbia University. She then served as assistant professor of Chinese and Japanese Literature at Barnard College/Columbia University from 2006 to 2010, followed by a position as assistant and associate professor of Chinese, Japanese, and Comparative Literature at Boston University from 2010 to 2019, where she was promoted to the rank of professor. During this period, she was also affiliated with the Department of Classical Studies and founded the BU Comparative Studies of the Premodern World Initiative with Sunil Sharma. Since 2021, she has served as Professor of East Asian Literatures at MIT's School of Humanities, Arts, and Social Sciences, and since 2023, she has held the S. C. Fang Chair for Chinese Language and Culture.

Denecke served as an advisory board member at the Institute for World Literature, and as a member of the executive council for the International Comparative Literature Association from 2013 to 2016. Since 2019, she has been an expert for the European Science Foundation's College of Expert Reviewers and a member of the international advisory board for the "Temporal Communities: Doing Literature in a Global Perspective" Cluster of Excellence in Berlin. She leads the Comparative Global Humanities Initiative at MIT.

== Works ==
Denecke authored The Dynamics of Masters Literature: Early Chinese Thought from Confucius to Han Feizi, which examined early Chinese "Masters Literature", known as Chinese philosophy in the West. She argued that taking the indigenous Chinese categorization of these texts as Masters Literature seriously offers new understandings of both Chinese thought and Western philosophy. Ralph Weber of Europa Institut praised the book, noting that "Denecke's close readings often bear the character of out-of-competition personal notes." He also praised how, behind her personal notes, there is a hidden purpose aimed at making a significant impact, reshaping disciplinary boundaries and taxonomies. Her second book Classical World Literatures: Sino-Japanese and Greco-Roman Comparisons compared how early Japanese and Roman authors developed their literary traditions through and against the established works of China and Greece. In his review for the Journal of Asian Studies, Alexander Beecroft praised the book stating "any review of Wiebke Denecke's recent Classical World Literatures must begin by celebrating the unique and groundbreaking contribution this book makes to cross-cultural studies."

Denecke has co-edited The Oxford Handbook of Classical Chinese Literature and a three-volume revisionary literary history of Japan titled A New History of Japanese "Letterature" (日本「文」学史). The third volume is a comparative literary history of China, Japan, and Korea. Additionally, she has served as an Editor for A Companion to World Literature, which includes essays from scholars on key literary topics. Since 2008, she has been part of the editorial team for the Norton Anthology of World Literature, which has featured selections of literary works. In 2024, it was released as an e-book, accompanied by audio-visual materials from the editors.

Denecke is the Founding Editor-in-Chief of The Hsu-Tang Library of Classical Chinese Literature, a bilingual translation series presenting three millennia of classical literature from East Asia's Sinitic world to contemporary readers.

== Research ==
With the 2006 article Disciplines in Translation: From Chinese Philosophy to Chinese What? and her subsequent book The Dynamics of Masters Literature, Denecke warned against imposing the Western-associated term of early Chinese "philosophy" on the texts associated with early Chinese master figures like Confucius, Mencius, or Laozi. Relying on the traditional Chinese categorization of these texts, she coined the term "Masters Literature" or "Masters Texts."

Denecke is most known for her research on Japan's biliteracy, the production of literature both in classical Japanese and in Literary Chinese, which functioned as cosmopolitan language connecting East Asia, comparable to Latin in the European Middle Ages. Much of her research has highlighted Japan's unique adaptation of Chinese culture, revealing how early Japanese poets and anthologists engaged with Chinese literary traditions to establish their own distinct literary identity. As a critique of too literal understandings of intertextuality, the main paradigm literary critics have used to explain influences between texts, she coined the concept of "intertopicality" in premodern Chinese and Japanese poetry, demonstrating how set topics mattered more than exact quotations from specific texts and showing how tenth-century Japanese "Topic Poetry" evolved from references to inventive adaptations of topic phrases. In the essay "Worlds without Translation: Premodern East Asia and the Power of Character Scripts" she argued that, contrary to the alphabetic triumphalism proposed by the classicist Eric A. Havelock, Chinese characters offer distinct advantages over alphabetic scripts and suggested that a deeper focus on script in translation studies could reveal significant differences in the evolution of various literary traditions, such as Early Japanese and Latin literatures. In Shared Literary Heritage in the East Asian Sinographic Sphere, a book chapter she wrote in The Oxford Handbook of Classical Chinese Literature, she explored the distinctive literary and cultural interaction between China, Korea, Japan, and Vietnam through the lens of channels of communication, strategies of cultural appropriation, and foundations of literary culture, such as book circulation, anthologization, genre hierarchies, vernacular scripts, and women's writing.

Since 2021, Denecke has led the MIT Comparative Global Humanities initiative. She published a manifesto-style volume of the initiative as a Special Issue in History of Humanities, titled "Shared Pasts for Shared Futures: Prototyping a Comparative Global Humanities", in spring 2024.

== Bibliography ==
=== Books ===
- The Dynamics of Masters Literature: Early Chinese Thought from Confucius to Han Feizi (2011) ISBN 978-0674056091
- Classical World Literatures: Sino-Japanese and Greco-Roman Comparisons (2013) ISBN 978-0199971848
- The Norton Anthology of Western Literature (2014) ISBN 978-0393933642
- The Oxford Handbook of Classical Chinese Literature 1000 BCE-900CE (2017) ISBN 978-0190053185
- A Companion to World Literature (2020) ISBN 978-1118993187
- The Norton Anthology of World Literature 3rd, 4th, 5th editions (2012, 2018, 2023) ISBN 978-0393893090
- 日本「文」学史 [A New History of Japanese Letterature], edited with Kōno Kimiko, Shinkawa Tokio, and Jinno Hidenori (in Japanese). 3 vols. Bensei shuppan (2015–2019)
  - Volume One: 「文」の環境——「文学」以前 [The World of Letters: The Age Before Literature] (in Japanese) (530 pp.)
  - Volume Two:「文」と人びと――継承と断絶 [Letterature and Its People: Continuities and Ruptures] (in Japanese) (560 pp.)
  - Volume Three: 「文」から「文学」へ――東アジアの文学を見直す [The Path from Letters to Literature: A Comparative History of East Asian Literatures] (Tokyo: Bensei shuppan) (in Japanese) (607 pp.)
- Shared Pasts for Shared Futures: Prototyping a Comparative Global Humanities. Special Issue co-edited with Alexander Forte and Tristan Brown. History of Humanities 9.1 (2024)

=== Selected articles ===
- Denecke, W. (2004). Chinese Antiquity and Court Spectacle in Early" Kanshi". The Journal of Japanese Studies, 97–122.
- Denecke, W. (2007). " Topic poetry is all ours": Poetic composition on Chinese lines in early Heian Japan. Harvard Journal of Asiatic Studies, 1–49.
- Denecke, W. (2014). Worlds without translation: Premodern East Asia and the power of character scripts. A Companion to Translation Studies, 204–216.
- Denecke, W., & Nguyen, N. (2017). Shared Literary Heritage in the East Asian Sinographic Sphere. Classical Chinese Literature (1000 bce–900 ce), 510.
- Denecke, W. (2021). Comparative global humanities now. Journal of World Literature, 6(4), 479–508.
