= Sini, Oman =

Sinni
- Town
- Location in Oman
- Coordinates: 23°25′N 57°07′E
- Country: Oman
- Governorate: Al Batinah Region

Population (2020)
  - Total: 1,190
- Time zone: UTC+4 (+4)

Sini (Arabic: سني) is a town in Oman, in the wilayat of Rustaq. As of 2020, it has a population of 1,190.

Sini is one of the main villages in the Wadi Ben Gaffer area of northern Oman. High mountains and deep valleys are seen here. Sini is well-connected to the nearest town Rustaq and Ibr by asphalt roads. It has mobile connectivity too. The people are mostly from Al Shikeily tribe.
