= Heraclea (Aeolis) =

Town of ancient Aeolis

Coordinates: 39°18′27″N 26°41′23″E

Heraclea or Herakleia (Ancient Greek: Ἡράκλεια), also transliterated as Heracleia, was a town of ancient Aeolis. It was opposite to Hecatonnesi. This town and the neighbouring Coryphantis are called villages of the Mytilenaeans. The town may also have carried the names Elateia, Idale, and Itale during Roman times.

Its site is located near Ayvalık, Asiatic Turkey.
