= Aianteion (Thrace) =

Town of ancient Thrace

Coordinates: 41°01′41″N 28°58′58″E

Aianteion (Greek: Αἰάντειον) was a town of ancient Thrace, inhabited during Roman times.

Its site is located near Salı pazar in European Turkey.
