= Patraeus (city) =

Ancient Greek colony in the Taman Peninsula

Coordinates: 45°18′50″N 36°50′17″E

Patraeus (Ancient Greek: Πατραεύς, also Patraios, Patrasys, Patrasus, Patrey) was an ancient Greek Black Sea colony, east of the Strait of Kerch at the Taman Bay, about a kilometer west of the Russian village of Garkusha. The colony was founded by Miletus c. 550 BCE. Excavations have shown that it was an agricultural colony.

Patraeus was mentioned by Scylax of Caryanda, Hecataeus of Miletus, Strabo (Geographica, 11.2.8) and Stephanus of Byzantium. In modern times the site was first surveyed in 1853. After an initial archaeological dig in 1928, systematic excavations have been carried out in many years since 1948.

Before the arrival of the Milesians, there was a late Bronze Age agrarian settlement of the Sabatinovka-Rotbav-Noua Culture. Around 438 BCE the city joined the Delian League; a few decennia later it was conquered by the Bosporan Kingdom under its king Satyrus I. In the 4th to 2nd century BCE Patraeus reached its greatest prosperity. The city, at least 50 hectares at its largest, at the time consisted of a small Upper City that was surrounded by a moat, and a larger Lower City that is now under water. The surrounding plain was divided into agricultural plots measuring from 2.7 to 15 hectares.

In the third quarter of the first century BCE, under the Bosporan king Asander, a fortress was built as part of a defensive row of fortresses along the sea coast. In the middle of the first century CE the city was ravaged, and some fifty years later the fortress too was destroyed. However, archaeological data show that the population grew again in the second and third century CE, testifying of a renewed flourishing of the city, based on the production of wine: several wine pressing troughs date from this period, and also a pottery kiln, presumably used to produce wine jars.

In the 5th to 7th century a small population lived on the ruins of the fortress. The next two centuries saw some recovery, then a decline around 1000 CE, and a new revival starting about 1200 CE, when a quite large rural settlement developed that persisted until the 18th century.

Among the finds that the excavations have unearthed, are many coins, jewelry, inscriptions, pottery, and tools. An interesting find is a letter in the form of an inscribed lead plate, found in 2012 in the submersed Lower City. The letter discusses the collection of three debts, and dates from the second half of the fifth century BCE.
