= Coryphas =

Populated place in ancient Aeolis

Coordinates: 39°21′21″N 26°46′59″E

Coryphas or Koryphas (Ancient Greek: Κορυφάς), also known as Coryphantis or Koryphantis (Κορυφαντίς), was one of the settlements of the Mytilenaeans, on the coast of ancient Aeolis, opposite to Lesbos, and north of Atarneus. It is evidently the same place which appears in the Tabula Peutingeriana under the name Corifanio, between Adramyttium and Elateia — which may be another name of Heraclea. Strabo mentions Coryphantis and Heraclea, and "after them, Attea." The oysters of Coryphas are mentioned by Pliny the Elder.

Its site is located near Keremköy, Asiatic Turkey.
