= Scabala =

Coordinates: 40°19′57″N 23°35′26″E

Scabala or Skabala (Ancient Greek: Σκάβαλα), also known as Scabla or Skabla (Σκάβλα), was a town of Chalcidice in ancient Macedonia. It is cited in a fragment of Theopompus collected by Stephen of Byzantium, where it is claimed that it was a colony of Eretria. It belonged to the Delian League since it appears in the tribute registry of Athens between 454/3 and 433/2 BCE. Since it is probable that it was one of the cities that rebelled against Athens in the year 432 BCE and in one of the records it paid a phoros jointly with Olynthus and Assa, it has been suggested that it was located north of the peninsula of Sithonia, which suggestion is accepted by the editors of the Barrington Atlas of the Greek and Roman World.
