= Limnaea =

Limnaea or Limnaia (Ancient Greek: Λιμναία) may refer to:

- Limnaea (Acarnania), a town of ancient Acarnania, Greece
- Limnaea (Thessaly), a town of ancient Thessaly, Greece
- Limnaea, a genus of snails in the family Lymnaeidae, synonym of Lymnaea
- Limnaea, a genus of bivalves in the family Unionidae, synonym of Unio

== See also ==
- Limnae (disambiguation)
