= Scylace =

Town in ancient Mysia

Coordinates: 40°23′13″N 28°23′20″E

Scylace or Skylake (Ancient Greek: Σκυλάκη), was a town of ancient Mysia, on the coast of the Propontis, east of Cyzicus. It was a Pelasgian town; in this place and the neighbouring Placia, the Pelasgians, according to Herodotus, had preserved their ancient language down to his time. The Periplus of Pseudo-Scylax mentions only Placia, but Pomponius Mela and Pliny the Elder speak of both as still existing.

Its site is tentatively located near Yeni Köy, Bursa Province, Turkey.
