= Armene =

Town in ancient Paphlagonia

Coordinates: 42°02′57″N 35°02′31″E

Armene (Ancient Greek: Ἀρμένη or Ἁρμένη or Ἀρμήνη) was an ancient Greek city on the Black Sea coast of ancient Paphlagonia. Xenophon in his Anabasis writes that the Ten Thousand on their return anchored their ships here, and stayed five days. The place belonged to the Sinopians. It was 50 stadia west of Sinope, and had a port. A small river, named Ochosbanes by Marcian of Heraclea, and named also Ochthomanes in the Anonymous Periplus, and Ocheraenus in the Periplus of Pseudo-Scylax, falls into the harbour.

Strabo writes that there was the proverb, "whoever had no work to do walled Armene."

Its site is located near Akliman in Asiatic Turkey.
