= Limnae (Bithynia) =

Town of ancient Bithynia

Coordinates: 40°43′18″N 29°30′07″E

Limnae or Limnai (Ancient Greek: Λίμναι) was a town of ancient Bithynia on the coast of the Propontis.

It was a colony of Miletus.

Its site is located near Hersek, in Asiatic Turkey.
