= Nocara =

Nocara Greek: Karydiá
- Comune
- Comune di Nocara
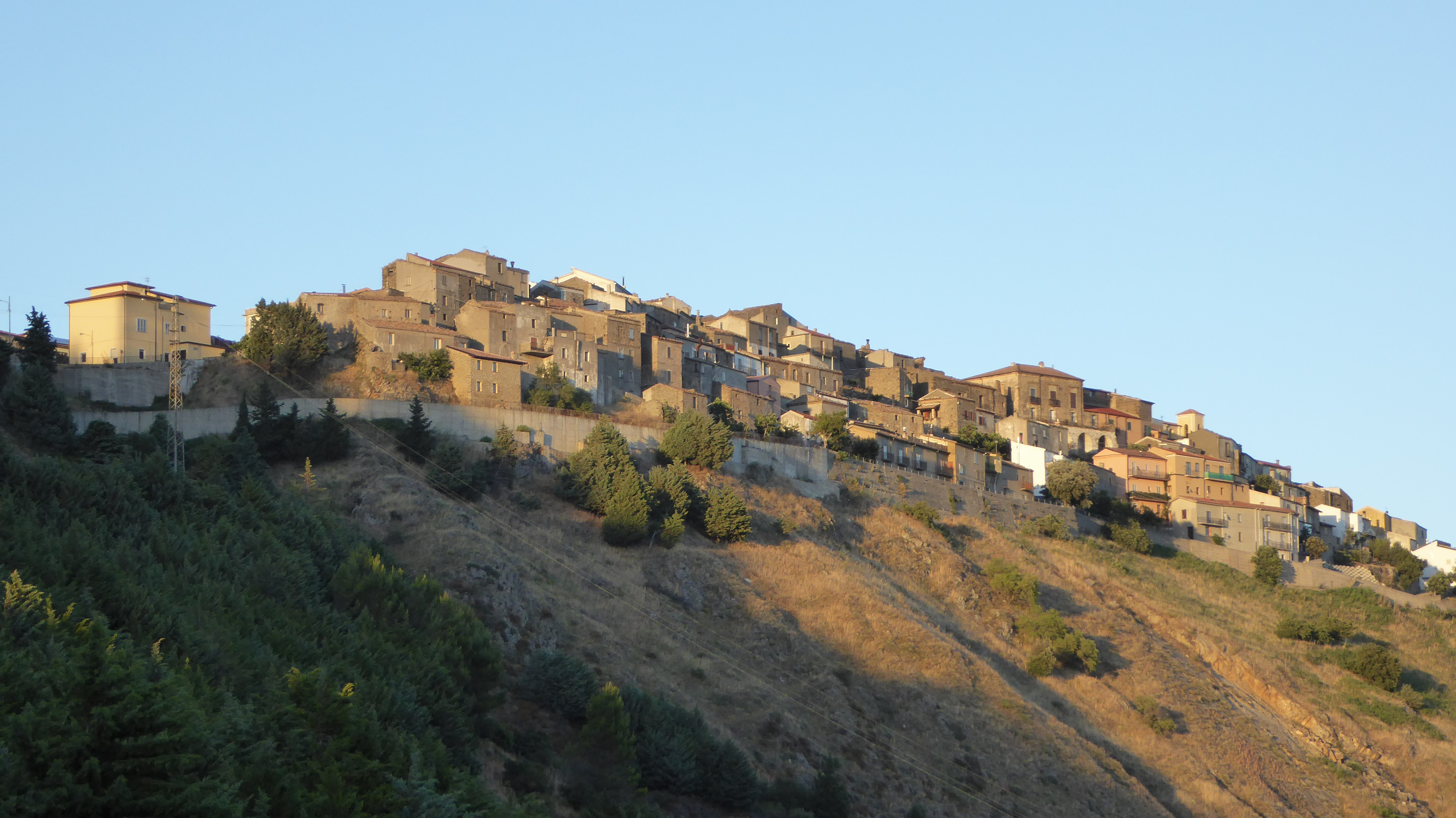

- Location within Italy Location within Calabria
- Coordinates: 40°6′N 16°29′E
- Country: Italy
- Region: Calabria
- Province: Cosenza (CS)

Government
  - Mayor: Mariantonietta Pandolfi

Area
  - Total: 34.05 km^{2} (13.15 sq mi)
- Elevation: 859 m (2,818 ft)

Population (2007)
  - Total: 505
  - Density: 14.8/km^{2} (38.4/sq mi)
- Demonym: Nocaresi
- Time zone: UTC+1 (CET)
  - Summer (DST): UTC+2 (CEST)
- Postal code: 87070
- Dialing code: 0981
- ISTAT code: 078086
- Patron saint: Saint Nicholas
- Saint day: 9 May
- Website: Official website

Nocara is a town and comune in the province of Cosenza, in the Calabria region of southern Italy.
