= Aianteion (Troad) =

Town in ancient Troad

Coordinates: 39°59′37″N 26°15′20″E

Aianteion or Aeantium (Ancient Greek: Αἰάντειον) was a town in ancient Troad. Its name is translated as "of Ajax"

It was founded by the Rhodians in honour of Ajax of Salamis and was named after him. Pliny the Elder mentioned that the town was built near the tomb of Ajax.

Its site is located near Kumkale, Asiatic Turkey.
