= Sinni (river) =

River in Basilicata, Italy

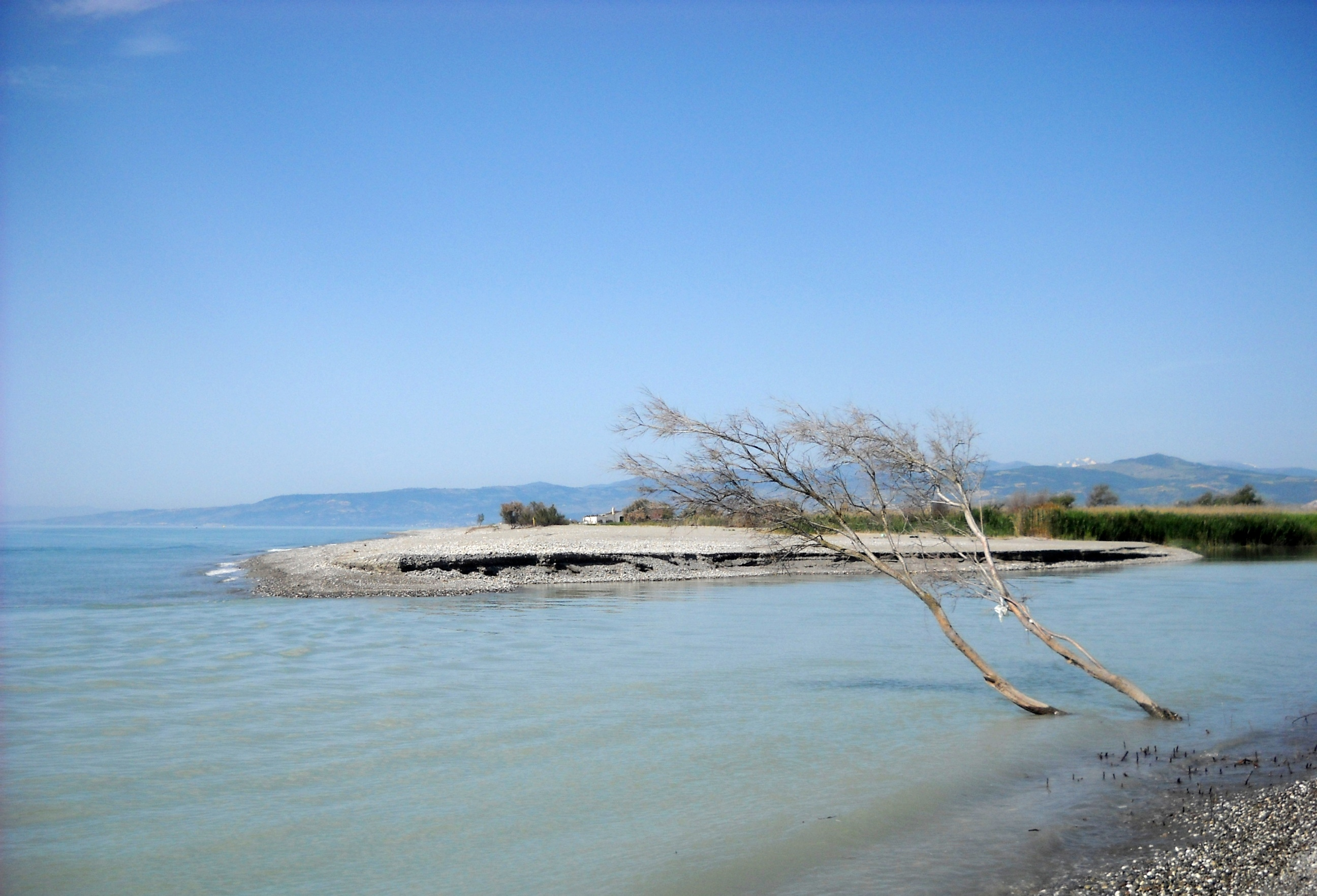
- Mouth of the Sinni river near Policoro, Basilicata

Physical characteristics
- Source
  - location: Serra della Giumenta (Lucan Apennines)
  - elevation: 1,380 m (4,530 ft)
- Mouth: Gulf of Taranto
  - location: south of Policoro
  - coordinates: 40.1529°N 16.6917°E
  - elevation: 0 m (0 ft)
- Length: 94 km (58 mi)
- Basin size: 1,292 km^{2} (499 sq mi)

The Sinni (Latin: Siris or Semnus; Greek: Σῖρις or Σίνις) is a 94 km long river in the Basilicata region of southern Italy. In antiquity, the city of Siris lay at its mouth. Near the town of Senise, a dam on the river was built in 1970-1982, the largest in Europe built with earth. In correspondence with it, it forms the Lago di Monte Cotugno, one of the largest artificial basins in Italy.

== Geography ==
The source of the river is in the Lucan Apennines west of Castelsaraceno and south of Moliterno in the province of Potenza. The river flows south before curving eastward near Monte la Spina. It flows near Latronico before entering the Parco Nazionale del Pollino. The river is joined by a right tributary near Francavilla in Sinni before flowing into Lago di Monte Cotugno. The river exits the lake and forms the border between the province of Potenza and the province of Matera for a short distance before entering the province of Matera. The Sarmento River flows into the Sinni as a right tributary at the point where the Sinni leaves the Parco Nazionale del Pollino. The Sinni curves northeast and flows near Colobraro and Valsinni before curving southeast and finally flowing into the Gulf of Taranto south of Policoro.

== History ==
The river Siris is mentioned by Lycophron (Alex. 982), as well as by Archilochus (ap. Athen. xii. p. 523); but the former author calls it Σίνις, and its modern name of Sinno would seem to be derived from an ancient period; for we find mention in the Tabula Peutingeriana of a station 4 miles from Heracleia, the name of which is written Semnum, probably a corruption for Ad Simnum or Sinnum. The Siris and Aciris (modern Agri) are mentioned in conjunction by Pliny as well as by Strabo, and are two of the most considerable streams in Lucania. (Plin. iii. 11. s. 15; Strab. vi. p. 264.) The name of the former river is noticed also in connection with the first great battle between Pyrrhus and the Romans, 280 BCE, which was fought upon its banks (Plut. Pyrrh. 16). It has been confounded by Florus and Orosius with the Liri in Campania. (Flor. i. 18. § 7; Oros. iv. 1.)
