= Noepoli =

Noepoli Griko:Noepolis
- Comune
- Comune di Noepoli
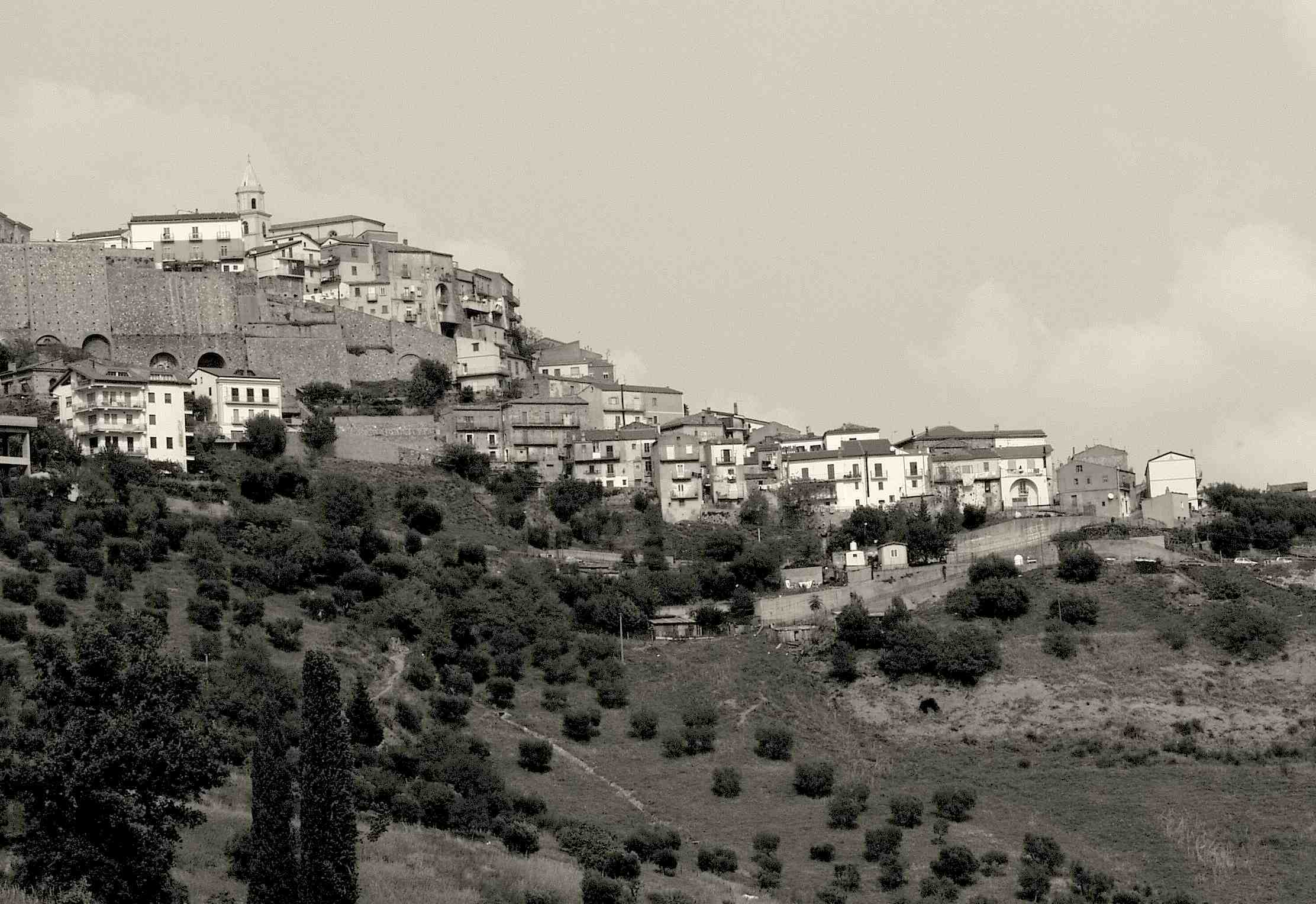
- View of Noepoli

- Coat of arms

- Location of Noepoli in Italy Noepoli (Basilicata)
- Coordinates: 40°5′N 16°20′E
- Country: Italy
- Region: Basilicata
- Province: Potenza (PZ)
- Frazioni: Filocastagno, Sicileo Scazzariello

Government
  - Mayor: Francesco Antonio Calabrese

Area
  - Total: 46.71 km^{2} (18.03 sq mi)
- Elevation: 676 m (2,218 ft)

Population (31 December 2009)
  - Total: 1,024
  - Density: 21.92/km^{2} (56.78/sq mi)
- Demonym: Noiesi
- Time zone: UTC+1 (CET)
  - Summer (DST): UTC+2 (CEST)
- Postal code: 85035
- Dialing code: 0973
- ISTAT code: 076055
- Patron saint: Madonna of Constantinople
- Saint day: 6 August
- Website: Official website

Noepoli is a comune in the province of Potenza, in the southern Italian region of Basilicata. This ancient Lucanian village is situated in the Sarmento Valley, at the heart of the Pollino National Park.

== History ==
Originally an Onotrio-Lucanian centre from the 8th to the 4th century BC, the village took on the name of Noia during the medieval period when it became a centre of learning for Greek Basilian monks.

With the advent of the Normans during the 11th century, Noepoli became a Lordship of Count Alessandro of Chiaromonte as testified in a document which ratifies his donation from the S. Onofrio Monastery to the Cersosimo Church (1093).

In 1404, it became an autonomous fief, but under the Aragonese it passed to the Del Balzo family and then to the Princes of Sanseverino of Salerno (15th century).

In 1863, the village took on its present-day name of Noepoli.

== Main sights ==
- Visitation Parish church (16th century)
- Madonna of Constantinople Chapel (15th century)
- Madonna of the Rosary Chapel (15th century)
- Former Archive of the Signore di Noia Building (16th century)
- Palazzo Rinaldi (19th century)
- Palazzo De Cicco
- S. Maria della Saectara Baronial Monastery (10th-11th century) in Rubbio
- Farneta Woods

== Events ==
Religion plays a big part of social life in the area, with many religious festival involving the whole village and bringing the locals together. These include: Traditional Annual Fair on 5 April; Feast of Sant’Antonio on 13 June; Feast of the Madonna of Constantinople on 4–6 August (the largest and best known local event, with procession of votive altars and tarantella dance around the village); Feast of the Madonna del Rosario on 20 and 21 October; Pheasant and Chestnut Festival in November; Wine Festival on 8 December; Madonna of Pantano: Procession on Easter Monday; Feast on the 2nd Sunday in May; Fiaccolata on 7th and Feast on 8 September.
