= Placia =

Town of ancient Mysia

Coordinates: 40°23′52″N 28°16′39″E

Placia or Plakia or Placie or Plakie (Ancient Greek: Πλακίη), also known as Placa or Plaka or Place or Plake (Πλάκη), was a town of ancient Mysia, on the coast of the Propontis, at the foot of the Mysian Olympus east of Cyzicus. It was a Pelasgian town; in this place and the neighbouring Scylace, the Pelasgians, according to Herodotus, had preserved their ancient language down to his time. The town is mentioned in the Periplus of Pseudo-Scylax, and by Pomponius Mela, Dionysius of Halicarnassus and Pliny the Elder.

Its site is tentatively located near Kurşunlu, in Bursa Province, Turkey.
