= Campsite Memorial of Augustus =

- Location within Greece
- 39°01′39″N 20°44′08″E
- Type: trophy
- Periods: Roman Empire
- Cultures: Greek and Roman
- Location: Nikopolis, Greece

History
- Built: 29-27 BC
- Built by: Augustus
- Abandoned: Late Antiquity
- Event: Battle of Actium

Site notes
- Material: Marble, limestone, sandstone, Roman concrete, etc.
- Excavation dates: From early 20th century
- Archaeologists: W. M. Leake, A. Philadelpheus, K. Romaios, G. Miladis, P. M. Petsas, W. M. Muray, K. L. Zachos, etc.
- Discovered: 1805, by W. M. Leake
- Condition: Ruined

The Campsite Memorial of Augustus, or Octavian's Tropaeum for the Battle of Actium was a victory trophy (tropaeum) built by Emperor Augustus to commemorate his decisive naval victory over Mark Antony and Cleopatra VII at the Battle of Actium in 31 BC. Located on a hill north of Nikopolis, Greece, the monument was part of Augustus' broader efforts to celebrate his triumph and consolidate his political and religious authority. The structure combined military symbolism with religious dedication, prominently displaying bronze rams from the captured enemy ships and reliefs reflecting Augustan propaganda.

== History ==
=== Construction ===
The tropaeum was built between 29 and 27 BC, following Octavian's decisive victory in the Battle of Actium. It was erected on Michalitsi Hill, north of the newly founded Nikopolis (literally, 'City of Victory'), the city he had established also to celebrate this victory. The hill was sacred to Apollo and the memorial was dedicated to Neptune and Mars — deities Augustus credited for his victory. It served as a religious dedication, political statement, and physical commemoration of naval dominance, renowned for its display of bronze rams captured from the defeated fleets of Antony and Cleopatra.

The monument functioned as a pivotal component of Augustus' commemorative projects around the battleground of the Actian War. As a campsite memorial, it was near the battle site, probably on the location of Augustus' military encampment during the war according to Roman historian Cassius Dio. A road linked the Campsite Memorial with Nikopolis, and the city's grid plan and centuriation (land division) aligned perfectly with the axis formed by this road, which increased the memorial's visibility. Located on a hilltop and oriented towards the naval battlefield, it dominated the landscape and would direct a visitor's gaze upon the other battle-site commemorative projects, such as the Actian dekanaia and the Temple of Apollo Aktios.

=== Decline ===
The tropaeum, surviving the raid that occurred to its surroundings in 267 AD, might have remained in operation as late as the reign of Constantine I and was repaired in the fourth century. The final destruction of the monument might involve fire damage and deliberate smashing, probably due to religious fanaticism. The precise date, however, remains debatable.

In the following centuries, the structure suffered from both man-made depredation and natural erosion and landslides. The most recent damage occurred during the Second World War when occupying Italian forces reportedly plundered stone blocks and inscription fragments to construct military fortifications, and their construction of a kiln also destroyed the western end of the second retaining wall.

=== Rediscovery and Excavation ===
The ruins were first found in modern times by W. M. Leake in 1805 before it was partially excavated in 1913 by A. Philadelpheus. However, Philadelpheus mistakenly interpreted the remains as the site of a temple. In 1925, K. Romaios, continuing the excavation, believed that the ruins belonged to an open-air sanctuary and noticed that there had once been captured rams displayed in front of the structure. Subsequent excavation by G. Miladis in 1926 recovered pieces of inscription.

A major systematic study began in 1974 under P. M. Petsas and W. M. Murray, leading to extensive documentation of the ruins. In 1995, a comprehensive project of excavation, research, and conservation was initiated under K. L. Zachos. These efforts uncovered additional inscription fragments, sculptural reliefs, and architectural elements.

== Architecture ==
The tropaeum was designed as an open-air sanctuary, structured on two terraces supported by retaining walls facing southwards. The lower terrace was supported by the first retaining wall made of opus caementicium. Above the lower terrace stood the second retaining wall made of limestone blocks, on which the bronze rams from Antony and Cleopatra's defeated fleet were prominently displayed. Measuring approximately 63 meters in length and about 7.3 m in height, the wall bent northwards at both ends towards the hill to support the rectangular upper platform. The platform contained a square court (peristyle) 38 m in width and length, surrounded on three sides by a Π-shaped stoa, leaving the south side open. The court featured an altar at the center and probably three statues.

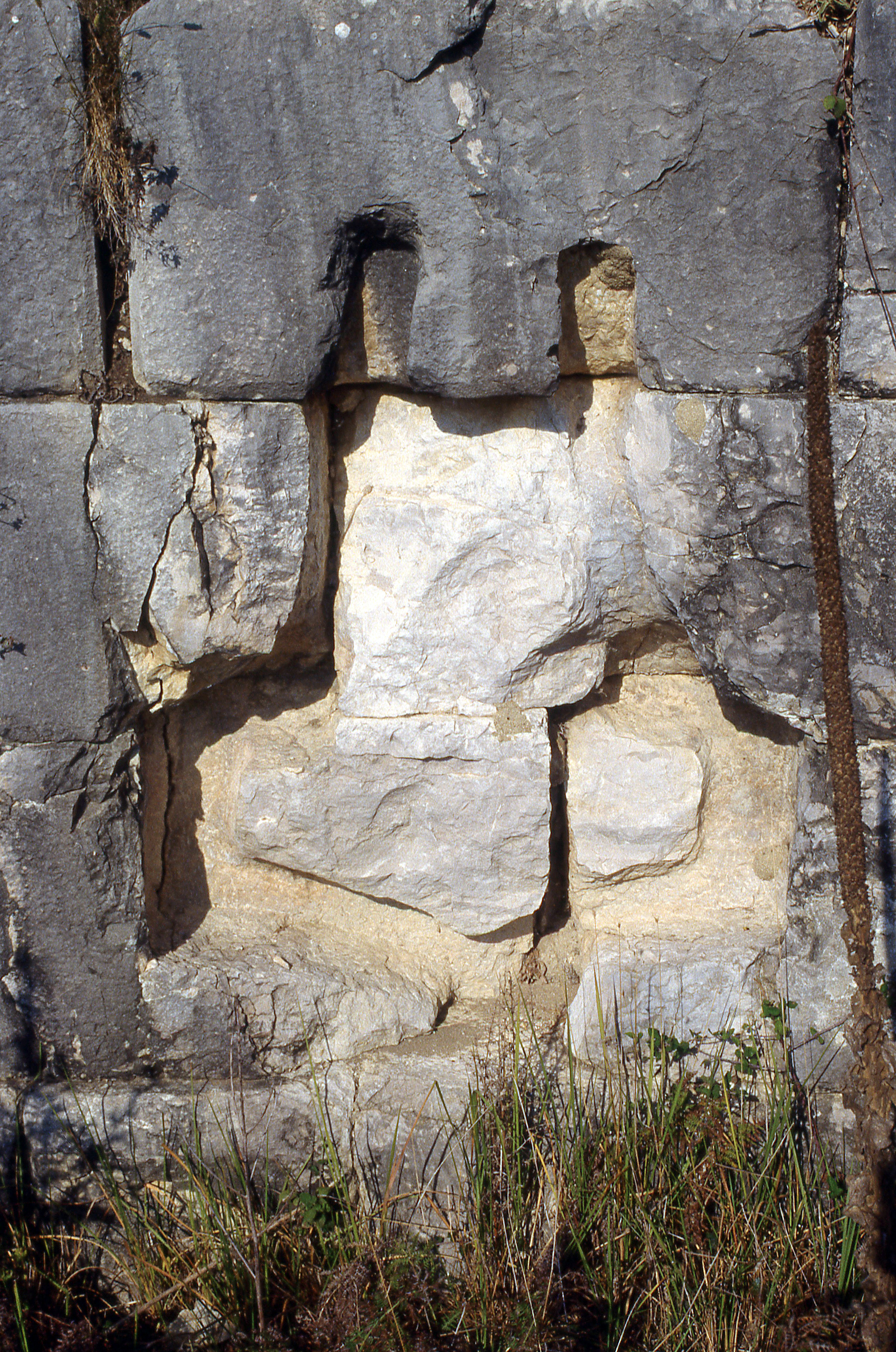
Socket that once held a bronze ram on the second retaining wall

=== Ram display ===
Above the lower terrace, on the massive retaining wall that formed the monument's main façade, there were once at least 36 captured bronze rams on display. Nowadays, only the anchor-shaped sockets that originally held the rams remain on the site. The rams were arranged by size, with the largest at the western end. They came from various sizes of Hellenistic warships, probably ranging from class four to class ten. The rams were supported by rectangular stone pedestals positioned on the lower terrace about one meter from the second retaining wall. These pedestals contained metal brackets to hold the heavy bronze rams in place. Their locations and the dimensions of the sockets shed light on the design of different classes of ancient bronze rams as well as the composition of Antony and Cleopatra's fleet.

Above the rams, there was a Latin inscription on the retaining wall, celebrating Augustus' triumph and dedicating the monument to Neptune and Mars:

Imperator Caesar, son of the Divus Julius, victor in the war which he waged on behalf of the res publica in this region, when he was consul for the fifth time and imperator for the seventh, after peace had been secured on land and sea, consecrated to Mars and Neptune the camp from which he set forth to attack the enemy, now ornamented with naval spoils.

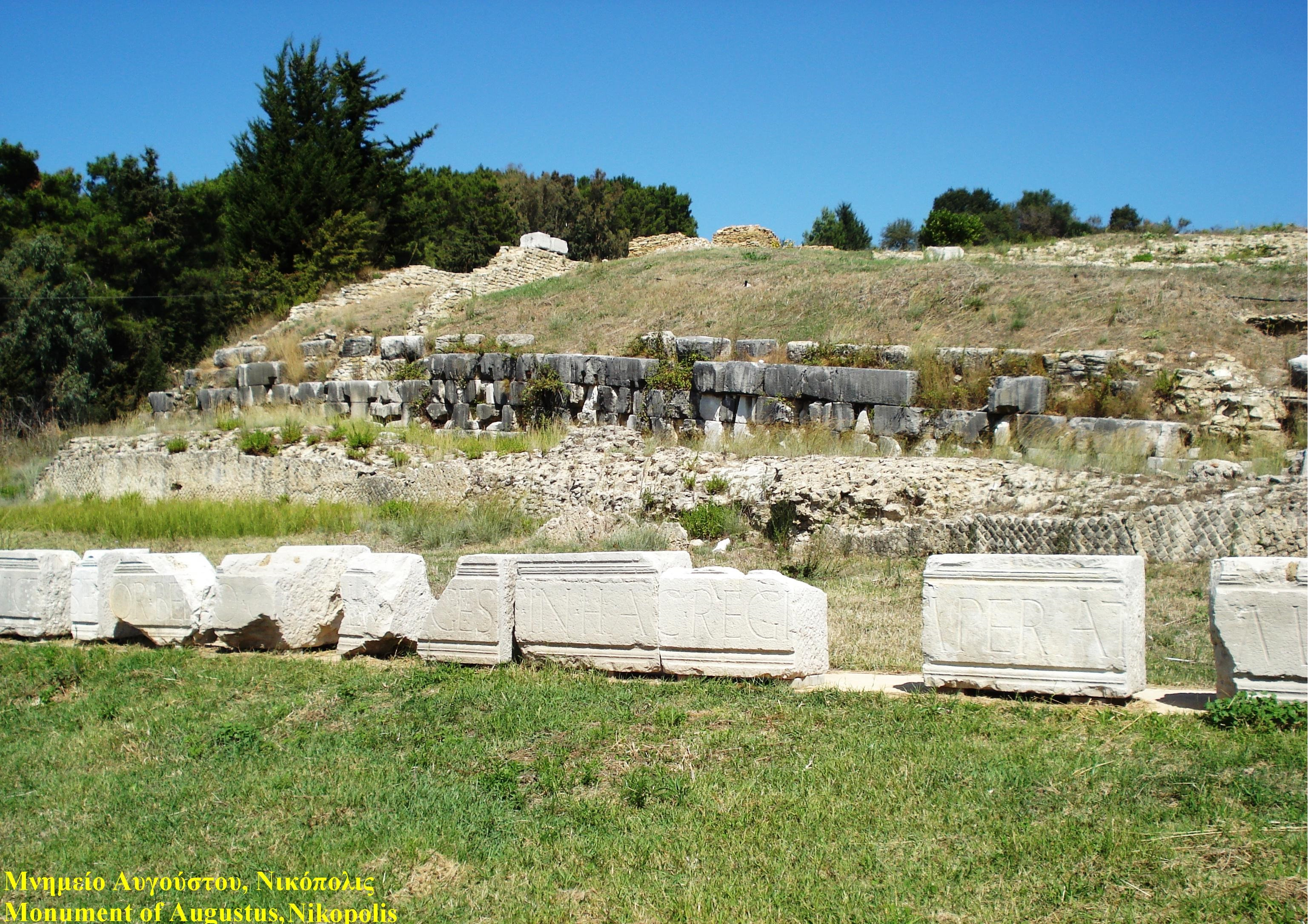
Inscription fragments from the second retaining wall, now placed in front of the wall

The text confirmed that the structure was erected shortly after the closing of the Temple of Janus in 29 BC and prior to Octavian officially adopting the imperial title of 'Augustus' in 27 BC. Thirty-three fragments of the inscription blocks were uncovered during excavations, though ten of them were lost probably during the Second World War.

=== Central altar ===
The upper terrace above the retaining wall was enclosed by a Π-shaped stoa on the northern, western, and eastern sides, which created a sacred courtyard. At its center was the main altar dedicated to Apollo, a large rectangular platform (22 x 6.5 m) made of sandstone that aligned with the monument's central axis.

The altar was decorated with relief, of which 1129 sculpted fragments have been recovered. They depicted symbolic and mythological scenes, emphasizing Augustus' military victory and the divine legitimacy of his rule. Notable relief themes included:

- Naval motifs: Ships and ship accessories such as steering oars and warship bows. They referred to the naval Battle of Actium and symbolized the naval victory.
- Amazonomachy: Possible depictions of Amazon warriors appeared on the altar relief as well as other parts of the tropaeum, possibly symbolizing the conflict between Rome and Antony's eastern allies.
- Weapons and trophies: Shields, helmets, spears, etc. hanging on tree trunks or arranged in piles, symbolizing victory.
- Triumphal procession: A scene of procession, which had multiple similarities with the procession scene on the Ara Pacis at Rome, is believed to represent one of Augustus' triumphs.
