= Temple of Apollo =

Temple of Apollo may refer to:

- Apollo § Temples of Apollo

== Cyprus ==
- Temple of Apollo Hylates, Limassol

== Czech Republic ==
- Temple of Apollo, Lednice–Valtice Cultural Landscape, South Moravian Region

== Greece ==
- Temple of Apollo, Corinth
- Temple of Apollo (Delphi)
- Temple of Apollo at Bassae
- Temple of Apollo Patroos, Athens
- Temple of Apollo Zoster, Vouliagmeni in Attica
- Temple of Apollo (Kolona), Aegina town, Aegina, Saronic Islands
- Temple of Apollo, Thermon
- Temple of the Delians, at Delos
- Temple of Apollo, Dreros, Crete
- Temple of Apollo, Gortyn, Crete
- Temple of Apollo Daphnephoros, Eretria
- Temple of Apollo Aktios (Actium)

== Italy ==
- Temple of Apollo, Cumae
- Temple of Apollo Palatinus, in Rome
- Temple of Apollo Sosianus, in Rome
- Temple of Apollo (Pompeii)
- Temple of Apollo (Syracuse), Sicily
- Temple C (Selinus), at Selinunte (formerly identified as a Temple to Herakles)

== Malta ==
- Temple of Apollo (Melite), now largely destroyed

== Turkey ==
- Temple of Apollo Didyma, Aydın
- Temple of Apollo Miletus, Aydın
- Temple of Apollo Clarus, in Izmir Province
- Temple of Apollo (Side), in Antalya
- Temple of Apollo Smintheus (Hamaxitus), in Çanakkale
- Temple of Apollo (Hierapolis), in Denizli

== See also ==
- Apollo Temple, a landform in Coconino County, Arizona
- The Apollo of Temple, the original name of an indoor arena at Temple University in Philadelphia now known as Liacouras Center
