= Dellia gens =

The gens Dellia was a plebeian family of equestrian rank at ancient Rome. The most famous member of this gens was Quintus Dellius, who served under Mark Antony and later Octavian.

== Praenomina ==
The chief praenomina of the Dellii were Quintus, Gaius, and Titus, all of which were extremely common throughout all periods of Roman history. There are also multiple examples of Numerius, a relatively uncommon name, as well as Lucius, and one or two of Spurius, a name that had been common at one time, although it had become scarce by the early Empire. (Note: Spurius occurs in the filiations of two women named Dellia. Though once considered a respectable name, by the late Republic it had become associated with the adjective meaning "illegitimate", and was largely confined to families that had traditionally used it, or in the filiations of illegitimate children. In the case of Dellia Antiochis, it likely indicates that her father was unknown or unacknowledged; but this would not be the case for the freedwoman Dellia Attica, since it should be the praenomen of her former master. Thus, there must have been at least one Spurius Dellius.)

== Members ==
This list includes abbreviated praenomina. For an explanation of this practice, see filiation.

- Quintus Dellius, an eques who served successively with Dolabella, Cassius, and Mark Antony. Shortly before the Battle of Actium, he deserted to Octavian, perhaps motivated by his fear of Cleopatra, whom he had offended. He wrote a history of Antony's war against the Parthians, which is now lost, but was probably the main source of Plutarch's account of the campaign. Dellius is probably the same person to whom Horace dedicated one of his odes.
- Dellia Q. l. Chreste, buried at Rome, along with the freedman Quintus Dellius Ptolla, in a tomb dating from the late first century BC, or the early first century AD.
- Numerius Dellius N. l. Menocrates, a freedman named along with the freedwoman Dellia Theophila, in an inscription from Casilinum in Campania, dating from the late first century BC, or the early first century AD.
- Quintus Dellius Q. l. Ptolla, a freedman buried at Rome, along with the freedwoman Dellia Chreste, in a tomb dating from the late first century BC, or the early first century AD.
- Dellia N. l. Theophila, a freedwoman named along with the freedman Dellia Menocrates in an inscription from Casilinum, dating from the late first century BC, or the early first century AD.
- Dellia Sp. l. Attica, a freedwoman buried in an Augustan-era sepulchre at Bononia in Cisalpine Gaul, along with her husband, Lucius Acilius, his mother, Acilia Secunda, sister, Acilia Maxima, and Narcissus, probably a freedman.
- Titus Dellius T. f., one of the municipal quattuorvirs at Vicetia in Venetia and Histria, was buried along with his son, Titus Dellius Serenus, in a tomb dating from the first half of the first century.
- Quintus Dellius Arcesinus, named in an inscription from Rome, dating from the first half of the first century.
- Titus Dellius T. f. T. n. Serenus, built a tomb at Vicetia, dating from the first half of the first century, for himself and his father, Titus Dellius.
- Dellia Sp. f. Antiochis, buried at Rome, in a first-century tomb built by her son, Quintus Dellius Conon.
- Quintus Dellius Conon, built a first-century tomb at Rome for his mother, Dellia Antiochis.
- Quintus Dellius Q. l. Myro, a freedman and statuarius, or sculptor, buried in a first-century tomb at Verona in Venetia and Histria.
- Quintus Dellius Q. f. Optatus Ravennas, a negotiator, or merchant, buried at Venusia in Samnium, in a first-century tomb built by his freedman, Priscus.
- Quintus Dellius Q. l. Priscus, a freedman who built a first-century tomb at Venusia for his former master, Quintus Dellius Optatus Ravennas.
- Dellius, a centurion named on a tabula ansata from Vindonissa in Germania Superior, dating between the death of Autustus and the end of the first century.
- Dellia Jucunda, made an offering at Rome, consisting of two pots purchased from Gaius Lupatius Pothinus, dating between the death of Augustus and the middle of the first century.
- Quintus Dellius Q. l. Rufio, a freedman, built a tomb at Rome, dating from the middle portion of the first century, for Dellia Nebris.
- Dellia Nebris, buried at Rome, aged eighteen, in a tomb built by the freedman Quintus Dellius Rufio, dating from the middle portion of the first century.
- Quintus Dellius Q. f. Super, a veteran of the Legio XV Apollinaris, buried at Aquileia in Venetia and Histria, along with his wife, Dellia Falerna, son, Quintus Dellius Clemens, the freedman Albanus and freedwoman Pusilla, in a tomb dating from the latter half of the first century.
- Dellia Falerna, the wife of Quintus Dellius Super, and mother of Quintus Dellius Clemens, with whom she was buried in a family sepulchre at Aquileia, dating from the latter half of the first century.
- Quintus Dellius Q. f. Q. n. Clemens, the son of Quintus Dellius Super and Dellia Falerna, with whom he was buried in a family sepulchre at Aquileia, dating from the latter half of the first century.
- Quintus Dellius Amicus, known from a first-century bronze stamp found at Pompeii in Campania.
- Dellia Q. l. Chia, a freedwoman buried in a first-century tomb at Pompeii.
- Quintus Dellius Q. l. Fuscus, one of the Seviri Augustales, buried at Iader in Dalmatia, dating from between the middle part of the first century to the early part of the second.
- Quintus Dellius, buried at Iader, in a tomb dedicated by the decurions of the town, dating between the middle part of the first century, and the first half of the second.
- Dellia Primigenia, inurned at Rome, in a cinerarium dating from the latter half of the first century, or the first half of the second.
- Lucius Dellius, named in an inscription commemorating the building of a temple to Jupiter Optimus Maximus at Veleia in Cisalpine Gaul, dating from the latter part of the reign of Trajan.
- Gaius Dellius C. l. Hermes, the freedman of Gaius Dellius Proculus, named in an inscription commemorating the donors to the temple of Jupiter Optimus Maximus at Veleia, dating from the reign of Trajan.
- Gaius Dellius Proculus, named among the donors who funded the building of the temple of Jupiter Optimus Maximus at Veleia during the reign of Trajan.
- Dellius Verus, named in an inscription commemorating the donors to the temple of Jupiter Optimus Maximus at Veleia, dating from the reign of Trajan.
- Dellia Flaccilla, a young woman buried in a second-century tomb at Carthage in Africa Proconsularis, aged twenty years, eight months.
- Gaius Dellius M. f. Flavinus, a veteran of the Legio VII Gemina, buried at Nova Augusta in Hispania Tarraconensis, aged sixty-one, in a second-century tomb built by a Dellius Flavus, perhaps his son.
- Dellius Flavus, built a second-century tomb at Nova Augusta for Gaius Dellius Flavinus, perhaps his father.
- Gaius Dellius Phoebus, buried in a second-century tomb at Patavium in Venetia and Histria, along with his wife, Vibia Quieta. The inscription records that Phoebus paid for the tomb with his own money, and no other.
- Dellia Successa, built a tomb at Puteoli in Campania, dating from the latter half of the second century, or the first half of the third, for her son, Cocceius Idaeus, aged nineteen.
- Quintus Dellius Fortunatus, named in an inscription from Ostia, at least some of which dates from the early third century.

=== Undated Dellii ===
- Quintus Dellius, a potter whose maker's mark has been found at various locations in Venetia and Histria and Cisalpine Gaul.
- Numerius Dellius N. l. Cerdo, a freedman buried at Rome, alongside the freedwoman Dellia Phrusia.
- Dellia Q. l. Glaphyra, a freedwoman buried at Rome, alongside the freedman Quintus Dellius Hilarus.
- Dellia L. l. Helena, a freedwoman buried at Narbo in Gallia Narbonensis, along with the freedman Marcus Norbanus Rufio.
- Quintus Dellius Q. l. Hilarus, a freedman buried at Rome, alongside the freedwoman Dellia Glaphyra.
- Titus Dellius Istantis, a potter whose maker's mark has been found at Londinium in Britannia.
- Quintus Dellius Q. f. Martialis, buried at Tubusuctu in Mauretania Caesariensis, aged sixty-five.
- Quintus Dellius Q. f. Neo, built a tomb for himself at Arelate in Gallia Narbonensis.
- Dellia N. N. l. Phrusia, a freedwoman buried at Rome, alongside the freedman Numerius Dellius Cerdo.
- Lucius Dellius L. f. Rufus, dedicated a statue at Berytus in Syria to his wife, Flavia Alexandra Atticilla, funded by the decurions of the tow.
- Dellia Secunda, the wife of Gaius Caetronius Exoratus, with whom she was buried in a family sepulchre at the site of modern Lonigo, formerly part of Venetia and Histria.
- Titus Dellius Serenus, a potter whose maker's mark has been found at various locations in Venetia and Histria.

== See also ==
- List of Roman gentes

== Bibliography ==
=== Ancient sources ===
- Lucius Mestrius Plutarchus (Plutarch), Lives of the Noble Greeks and Romans (Parallel Lives).

=== Modern sources ===
- Giovanni Battista Brusin, Inscriptiones Aquileiae (Inscriptions of Aquileia), Udine (1991–1993).
- Bulletin Archéologique du Comité des Travaux Historiques et Scientifiques (Archaeological Bulletin of the Committee on Historic and Scientific Works, abbreviated BCTH), Imprimerie Nationale, Paris (1885–1973).
- René Cagnat et alii, L'Année épigraphique (The Year in Epigraphy, abbreviated AE), Presses Universitaires de France (1888–present).
- Dictionary of Greek and Roman Biography and Mythology, William Smith, ed., Little, Brown and Company, Boston (1849).
- Theodor Mommsen et alii, Corpus Inscriptionum Latinarum (The Body of Latin Inscriptions, abbreviated CIL), Berlin-Brandenburgische Akademie der Wissenschaften (1853–present).
- Notizie degli Scavi di Antichità (News of Excavations from Antiquity, abbreviated NSA), Accademia dei Lincei (1876–present).
- Marina Silvestrini, Le Tribù Romane (The Roman Tribes), Bari (2010).
