= Temple of Apollo Aktios =

Ruined temple in Actium, Greece

- Location within Greece
- 38°57′03″N 20°46′05″E
- Type: Temple
- Periods: Archaic Greece to Roman Empire
- Cultures: Greek and Roman
- Location: Actium, Greece

History
- Built: around 625 BCE
- Built by: People of Anactorium, Augustus, etc.
- Abandoned: Late Roman Period
- Event: the Festival of Aktia

Site notes
- Length: 24.15 m (79.2 ft)
- Excavation dates: 19th century; 2003
- Discovered: 1867, by François-Noël Champoiseau

The Temple of Apollo Aktios, or the Temple of Actian Apollo was a Greco-Roman temple located at Actium, at the mouth of the Ambracian Gulf in northwestern Greece. First established by the Corinthian colony of Anaktorium around 625 BCE, it was located on a hill and within its sanctuary according to Strabo and served as a focal point of the cult of Apollo Aktios, a god associated with the sea and navigation. In particular, the site gained prominence after the pivotal Battle of Actium in 31 BCE when Octavian (later Emperor Augustus) defeated Mark Antony and Cleopatra VII. To commemorate his victory, Octavian expanded the temple. Archaeological investigations have revealed evidence of three distinct construction phases, reflecting the site's evolution from its archaic origins to the Roman period.

== Discovery and Excavation ==
The site of the Temple of Apollo Aktios was first identified in 1867 by François-Noël Champoiseau, a French ambassador of Ioannina, whose initial excavation uncovered portions of the temple and fragments of two kouroi statues. However, subsequent years saw the site largely neglected, with much of the remaining structure being obscured by vegetation.

In 2003, a modern excavation began under the direction of the University of Ioannina to uncover the temple's architectural and cultural history. By 2008, excavations had unveiled the temple's eastern limit, which Champoiseau had partially revealed. Excavators also removed portions of an earthen embankment from the Ottoman period, exposing the entire southern wall of the temple. Meanwhile, a variety of artifacts were found, ranging from building components to pottery.

== Architectural Features and Artifacts ==
The temple's structure that remains today, which was mainly the result of the Roman expansion of the original Greek temple, was 24.15 m in length. The walls measure 1.75 m in height, and they were constructed using opus reticulatum, a Roman masonry technique characterized by small, square stones set diagonally to create a lattice-like pattern. In the temple's cella, a sandstone base was found, which might once support a central cult statue. Surrounding the statue base is pebble mosaic flooring. Decorated with geometric patterns, the mosaic's design not only provided a visually engaging surface but also highlighted the importance of the sandstone base for the central cult statue.

Additional findings include fragments of columns, statues, roof tiles, pottery, etc. Column fragments, including only one capital of the Doric order, were discovered, attesting to the use of the Doric column in the temple structure. On the other hand, the scarcity of their remains may resulted from the reuse of building materials after the abandonment of the temple. Also notably, two colossal heads of statues were found, probably of Apollo and Artemis. Carved with exceptional skill, they might once graced the temple's interior. Meanwhile, fragments of roof tiles with decorative elements have been recovered in abundance. Some of these tiles bear stamps that may identify their origin or the workshops involved in their production. Additional artifacts, such as Corinthian pottery and unguentaria, provide insights into the daily practices and religious rituals conducted at the site. Together, these findings offer a glimpse of the temple's architectural sophistication and its complex history.

== Three Architectural Phases ==
=== Archaic Phase ===
The Temple of Apollo Aktios dates back to Archaic Greece. It was first founded by the people of Anaktorium, a Corinthian colony to the southeast of the temple. Several architectural remains may dated back to this period, including the sandstone base in the temple's cella. Associated artifacts also include the two kouroi statues recovered in the 19th century.

=== Hellenistic Phase ===
From at least the 4th century onwards and until the Augustan period, the temple had been the major venue of the Actia, the festival and games that honored Apollo Aktios. By Hellenistic era, the festival and the sanctuary were overseen by the Acarnanians. At the same time, the temple itself underwent significant renovations. The statue base from the archaic phase was preserved and integrated into the new design, with the pebble mosaic flooring added to its surroundings. Artifacts from this period include elaborately decorated terracotta tiles and fragments of Doric columns. The temple's prominence is further corroborated by the abundance and variety of building materials and pottery remains, some with inscriptions and records linking it to their production.

=== Roman Phase ===
Following Octavian's victory at the Battle of Actium, the temple entered its Roman phase. Ancient sources, including Suetonius and Cassius Dio, mentioned Octavian's efforts to enlarge the temple, integrating it into his broader program of imperial propaganda, which matches the third construction phase proven by the excavation. The walls that remain today were constructed in this period, as their facing features opus reticulatum, a Roman construction technique prevailing from about the first century BCE to the early first century CE. Meanwhile, the colossal statues of Apollo and Artemis were also likely to be additions from Octavian's renovation project. Despite these enhancements, some elements of earlier phases were retained, with the archaic statue base preserved and the Hellenistic pebble mosaic adjusted to accommodate new foundations.

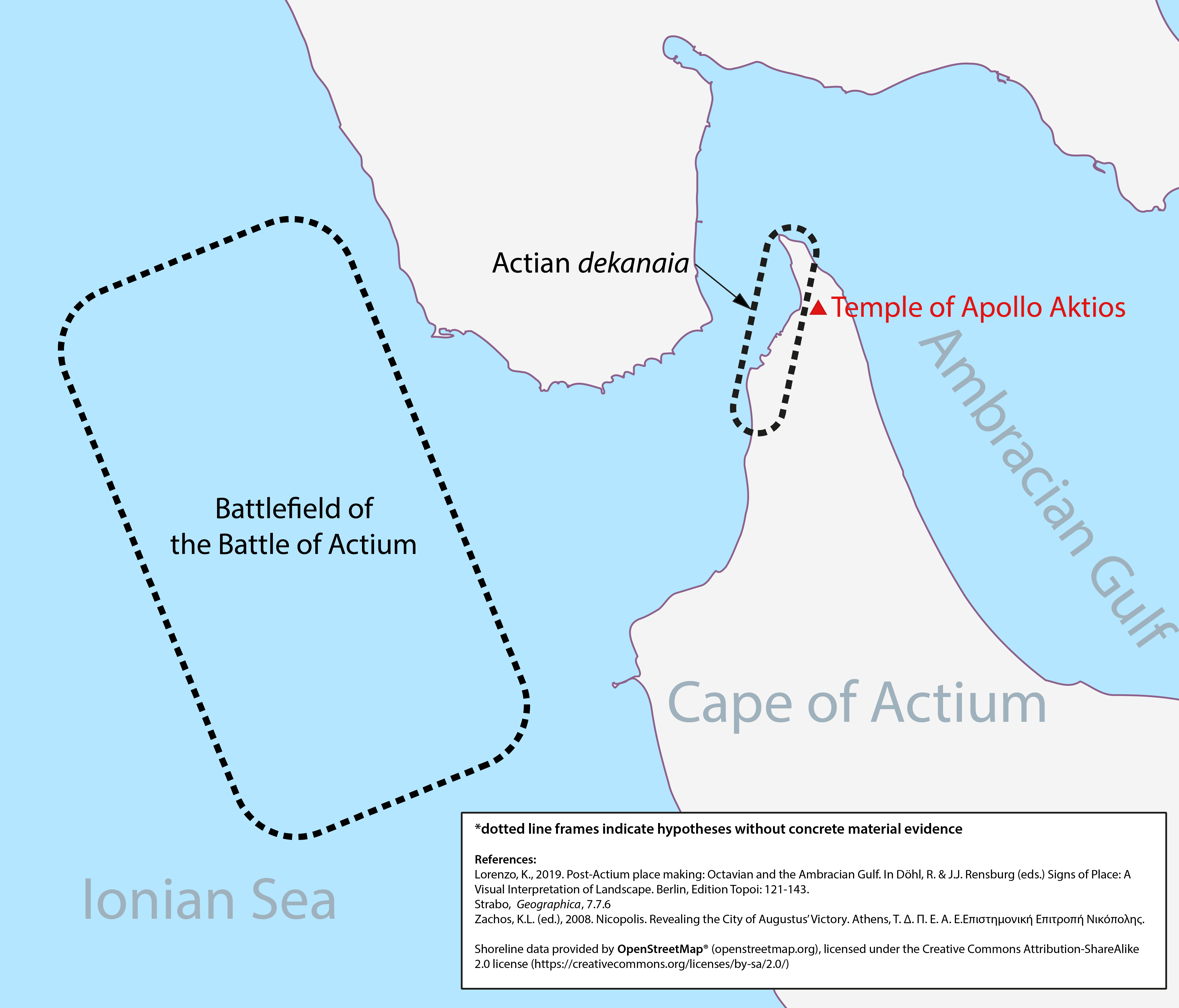
Location of the Temple of Apollo Aktios in relation to locations of the Battle of Actium and the Actian dekanaia

The renovation of the Temple of Apollo Aktios was part of Octavian's on-site commemorative projects that scattered around the former battlefield of the War of Actium, including the victory city of Nicopolis, the Campsite Tropaeum, and the Actian dekanaia. The temple was situated at a hill where one can oversee the whole battlefield of the Battle of Actium, the climax of the entire War of Actium, and Apollo Aktios was linked with Octavian's victory in his propaganda. One of the memorials, the Actian dekanaia, was located exactly down the hill of this temple and was dedicated to Apollo Aktios, highlighting the deity's role as a sacred symbol in the commemorative projects. However, the establishment of the new sanctuary of Apollo Aktios in the northern suburb of ⠀⠀Nicopolis⠀replaced the Temple of Apollo Aktios as the new venue of the god's festival Actia.

=== Decline and Destruction ===
The temple's decline likely began in the late Roman period. Archaeological evidence suggests that it was probably already abandoned when a catastrophic earthquake, possibly in 522 or 551 CE, caused significant structural damage. Collapsed walls and scattered architectural fragments attest to the violence of this event, and many of its architectural elements were later repurposed for other constructions.
