= Actian dekanaia =

- δεκαναΐα (Ancient Greek)
- Location within Greece
- 38°57′17″N 20°46′27″E
- Type: Trophy of arms
- Periods: Late Roman Republic to early Roman Empire
- Location: Actium, Greece
- Part of: On-site memorials for the War of Actium

History
- Built: After 31 BC
- Built by: Augustus
- Abandoned: Late 1st century BC or early 1st century AD

The Actian dekanaia (Ancient Greek: δεκαναΐα, literally 'set of ten') was a Roman trophion at the Cape of Actium composed of a dedication of ten warships, which served as a memorial for Caesar Augustus' naval victory over the allies of Mark Antony and Cleopatra VII in the Battle of Actium. Since no conclusive archaeological remains have been identified so far, the descriptions of the site by classical authors, especially Strabo, remain the only sources available.

According to Strabo's account in Geographica, the trophy was located on the shore down the hill where the Temple of Actian Apollo stood. It consisted of ten warships of various sizes captured from the fleets of Mark Antony and Cleopatra VII and were protected by ship sheds. These structures and the ships, however, were burned down by the time Strabo wrote about them.

== Significance ==
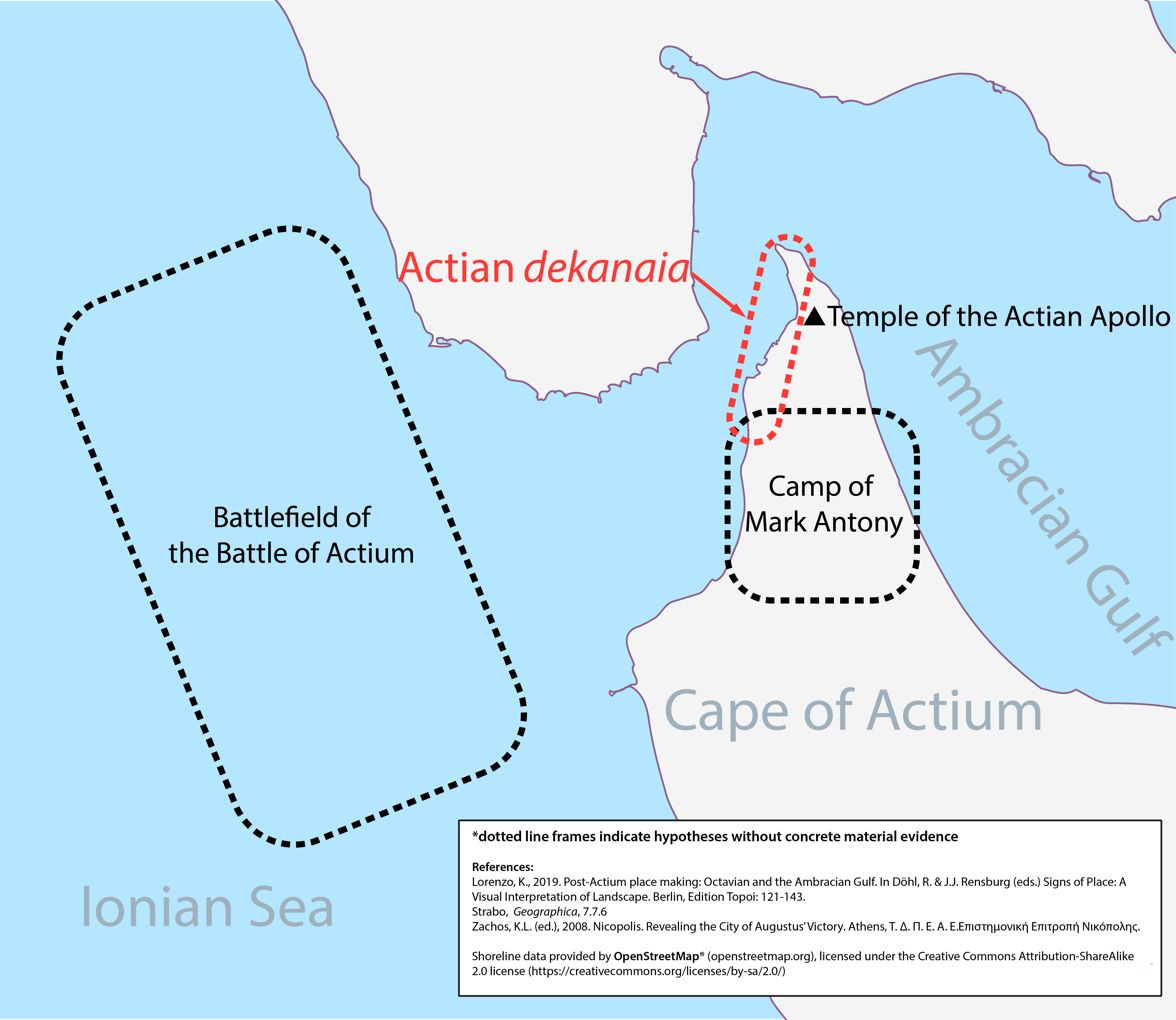
Approximate location of the Actian dekanaia in relation to the Temple of Actian Apollo and the battle locations

The Actian dekanaia was a pivotal component of Augustus' on-site commemorative projects that were scattered around the former battlefield of the War of Actium. The trophy was symbolically located near the naval battlefield of the Battle of Actium and probably within the area of Mark Antony's camp during the war, so as to further highlight the victory of Augustus and the defeat of his enemy. Meanwhile, the ten ships might involve all of the naval classes of Hellenistic-era warships. The dedication's sheer size and completeness might be the peak of the tradition of ship dedication after naval victory, serving as a clear demonstration of Augustus' total victory.
