= Monuments of Athens =

1924 book by Alexander Philadelpheus

Monuments of Athens (Greek: Μνημεία Αθηνών) is a book first published in 1924 by the Greek archaeologist Alexander Philadelpheus. It consists of an illustrated guide to the city of Athens, its museums and sites of interest expanding throughout the ancient Greek history and monuments of the city up to the "modern" times of the original author.

The book has been continuously republished and sold-out by the son and grandson of Alexander Philadelpheus, its latest edition being brought to sight in May 2004.
