= San Paolo Apostolo, Siracusa =

Church in Sicily, Italy

San Paolo Apostolo
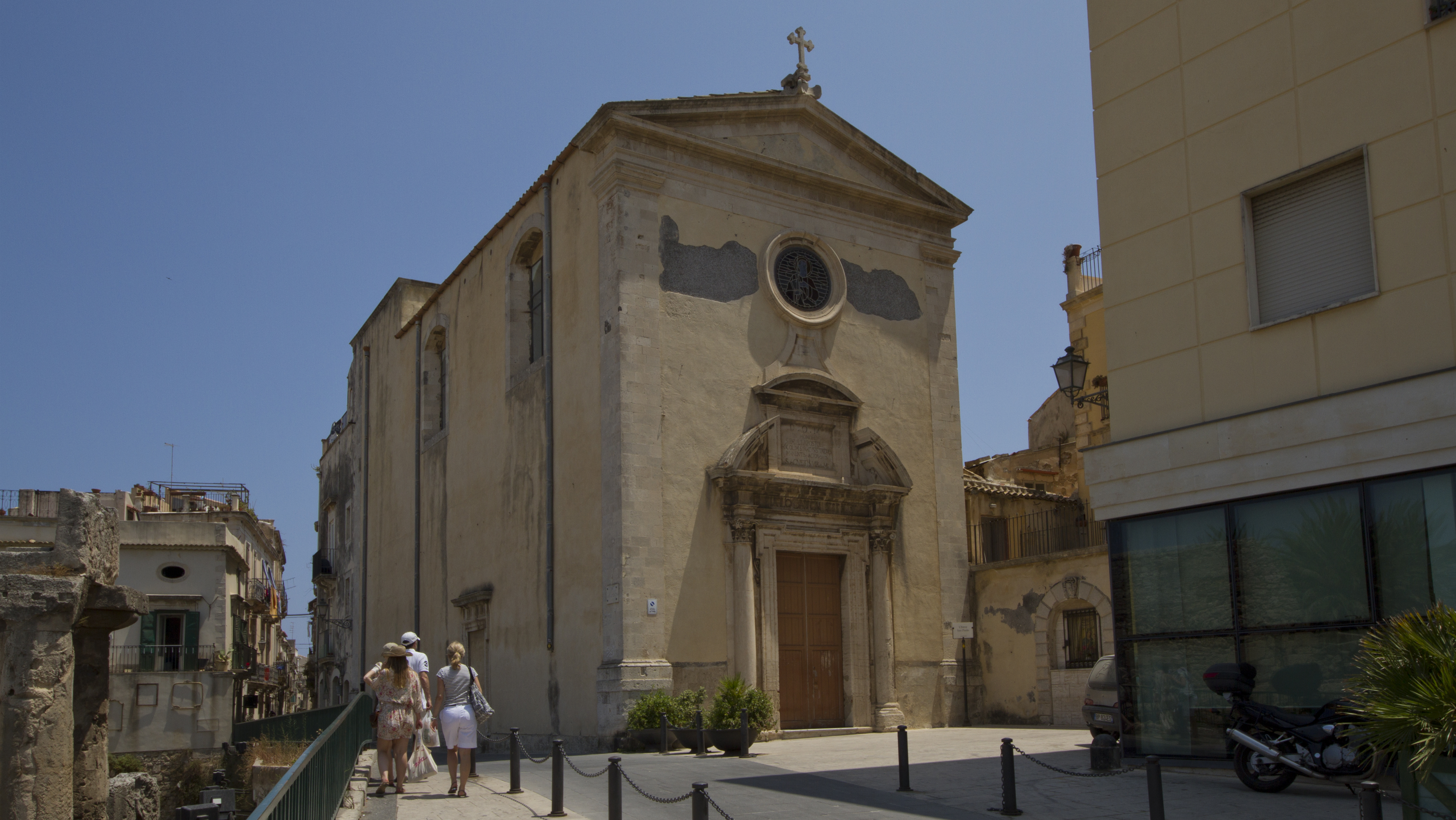
- Facade, at the left flank are the ruins of the Temple of Apollo

Religion
- Affiliation: Catholic Church
- Province: Siracusa

Location
- Location: Siracusa, Italy
- Interactive map of San Paolo Apostolo
- Coordinates: 37°03′50″N 15°17′36″E

Architecture
- Type: Church
- Style: Baroque

San Paolo Apostolo is a baroque-style, Roman Catholic parish church located on via dell'Apollonion on the island of Ortigia, in the historic city center of Siracusa in Sicily, Italy. It serves as a parish church for the Quartiere di la Graziella, once the quarter housing the families who worked in the fishing trade. Alongside the church are the ruins of the Temple of Apollo.

== Description ==
A church at the site stood since the early Christian era; it recalls a brief visit of apostle Paul to Syracuse. The present building dates to the 17th-century. The tympanum has an inscription that reads "HIC OLIM SYRACUSIS TRIDUO MANENTIS" (He stayed in Syracuse for three days), in reference to St Paul. The facade also has a small stained glass depiction of the saint,
