= Insteia gens =

Minor family in ancient Rome

The gens Insteia was a minor family at ancient Rome. No members of this gens held any of the curule magistracies under the Republic, but several served as military commanders under Rome's leading generals during the first century BC, and during Imperial times. By the second century, the family was important enough to obtain the consulship.

== Members ==
- Gaius Insteius, a cavalry commander under Sertorius in 76 BC, sent to the country of the Vaccaei in order to obtain fresh horses.
- Lucius Insteius, a commander under Sertorius during the Sertorian War. He was left in command of the city of Contrebia after Sertorius had conquered it.
- Marcus Insteius, elected plebeian tribune in 43 BC, was denounced by Cicero as a supporter of Mark Antony. He came from Pisaurum, where he was a bath attendant. Together with Marcus Octavius, Insteius commanded the center of Antony's fleet at the Battle of Actium in 31.
- Insteia Polla, priestess of Julia Augusta.
- Insteius Capito, a centurion under the general Gnaeus Domitius Corbulo in the east. He received hostages given by Vologases following a defeat. The Insteius Capito whom Corbulo installed as Praefectus castrorum over a number of small fortifications in Armenia is probably the same man.
- Marcus Insteius Bithynicus, consul suffectus in AD 162.
- Lucius Insteius Tertullus, Sodalis Augustalis in AD 214.
- Attius Insteius Tertullus, a statesman of the late third and early fourth centuries. He was consul suffectus in an uncertain year, after which he served as proconsul of Africa. He was praefectus urbi from AD 307 to 308.
- Attius Insteius Tertullus Populonius, governor of the province of Apulia and Calabria.

== See also ==
- List of Roman gentes

== Bibliography ==
- Marcus Tullius Cicero, Philippicae.
- Titus Livius (Livy), Ab Urbe Condita (History of Rome).
- Publius Cornelius Tacitus, Annales.
- Plutarchus, Lives of the Noble Greeks and Romans.
- Dictionary of Greek and Roman Biography and Mythology, William Smith, ed., Little, Brown and Company, Boston (1849).
- A. H. M. Jones & J. R. Martindale, The Prosopography of the Later Roman Empire (PLRE), vol I, AD 260–395 (1971–1980).
- C.B.R. Pelling (editor), Plutarch: Life of Antony, Cambridge University Press (1988), ISBN 0-521-24066-2.
- Laura Van Abbema, The Autonomy and Influence of Roman Women in the Late First/Early Second Century CE: Social History and Gender Discourse, University of Wisconsin, Madison (2008).
