= Temple of Apollo (Syracuse) =

Ancient Greek monument in Syracuse, Sicily, Italy

Coordinates: 37.0639°N 15.2930°E

- Apollonion
- Temple of Apollo at Piazza Pancali
- Interactive map of Temple of Apollo
- Type: Temple, church, mosque
- Periods: 6th century BC – c. 12th century
- Cultures: Greek-Siceliote, Roman, Byzantine, Saracen, Norman
- Location: Ortygia, Syracuse, Italy

UNESCO World Heritage Site
- Type: Cultural
- Criteria: ii, iii
- Designated: 2005
- Part of: Syracuse and the Rocky Necropolis of Pantalica
- Reference no.: 1200
- Region: Europe and North America

The Temple of Apollo (Ancient Greek: Ἀπολλώνιον Apollonion) is one of the most important ancient Greek monuments of Magna Graecia on Ortygia, in front of the Piazza Pancali in Syracuse, Sicily, Italy.

== History ==
Dating to the 6th century B.C., this temple is one of the most ancient Doric temples in Sicily, and among the first with the layout consisting of a peripteros of stone columns. This layout became standard for Greek temples. The temple underwent several transformations: closed during the persecution of pagans in the late Roman Empire, it was a Byzantine church, from which period the front steps and traces of a central door are preserved, and then an Islamic mosque during the Emirate of Sicily. After the Norman defeat of the Saracens, it was reconsecrated at the Church of the Saviour, which was then incorporated into a 16th-century Spanish barracks and into private houses, though some architectural elements remained visible. For instance, in 1778, Dominique Vivant Denon described the temple:

... In order to investigate this famous temple, the first built at Syracuse, it is now necessary to enter the house of a private individual, called Daniel, by paying a pound, where there are two capitals on their drums in the space between his bed and the wall, which are standing intact, augmenting the room. The columns are buried to more than half their height and are so close together that the capitals are not more than a few inches apart. In the process of some repairs and the digging of a cistern, the owner has discovered two other column drums, one in the corner and the other on the western side ...

These successive renovations severely damaged the building, which were rediscovered around 1890 inside the barracks and was brought to light in its entirety thanks to the efficient excavations of Paolo Orsi.

== Description ==
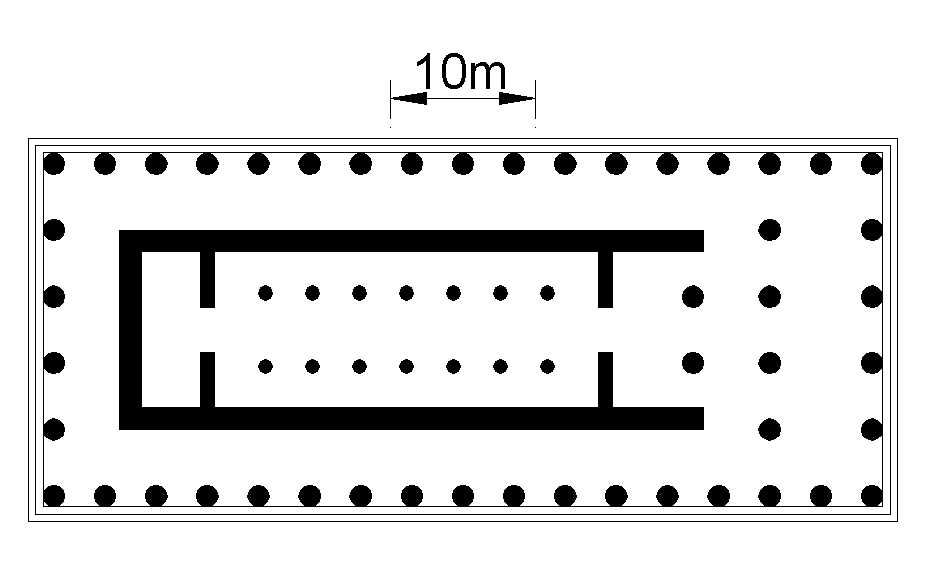
Floor plan

The temple's stylobate measures 55.36 x 21.47 metres, with its very squat columns in a 6 x 17 arrangement. It represents the moment of transition in the Greek west between temples with a wooden structure and those built completely out of stone, with a hexastyle front and a continuous colonnade around the perimeter which surrounds the pronaos and a naos divided into three aisles by two internal colonnades of more slender columns, which supported a wooden roof, which is difficult to reconstruct. At the back of the naos was a closed space, typical of Sicelian temples, called an adyton.

The construction of a building with forty-two monolithic columns, probably transported by sea, must have seemed incredible to its builders, as demonstrated by the unusual inscription on the top step on the eastern face dedicated to Apollo, in which the builder (or the architect) celebrates the construction of the building with an emphasis on the pioneering character of the construction.

The remains permit the reconstruction of the original appearance of the temple, which belongs to the proto-doric period and shows uncertainties in construction and style, such as the extreme closeness of the columns on the sides, the variation of the intercolumniation, the lack of concern for the correspondence of the triglyphs with the columns and archaic aspects the very elongated floor plan. The architrave was unusually high and lightened at the back by an L-shaped cross section.

Some aspects are very experimental, such as the importance given to the eastern face with a double colonnade, wider separation of the central columns and more generally a pursuit of emphasis rather than proportional harmony. The pioneering building was a defining step in the emergence of the peripteral Doric temple in Sicily, representing a sort of local prototype which juxtaposed aspects developed in mainland Greece with an unusual height which was imitated only in Magna Graecia, as well as the presence of the adyton, which was probably the location of the sacred image and formed the centre of the whole building.

Terracotta from the structure is preserved in the Museo Archeologico Regionale Paolo Orsi in Syracuse, along with fragments of the gutter and of the akroteria, and some roof tiles, probably among the first produced in Sicily.

== Gallery ==
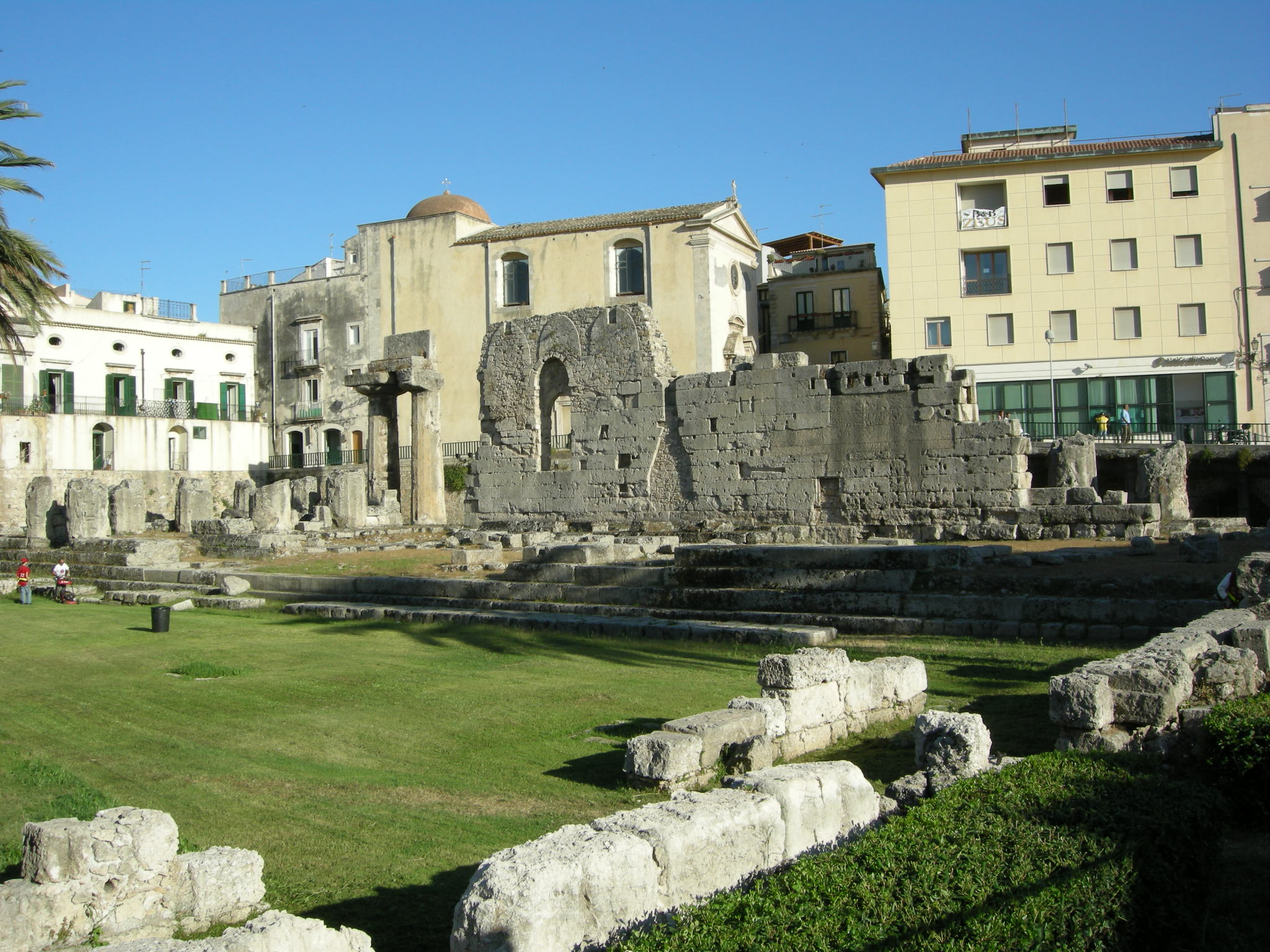
Temple precinct with small church of San Paolo Apostolo in background

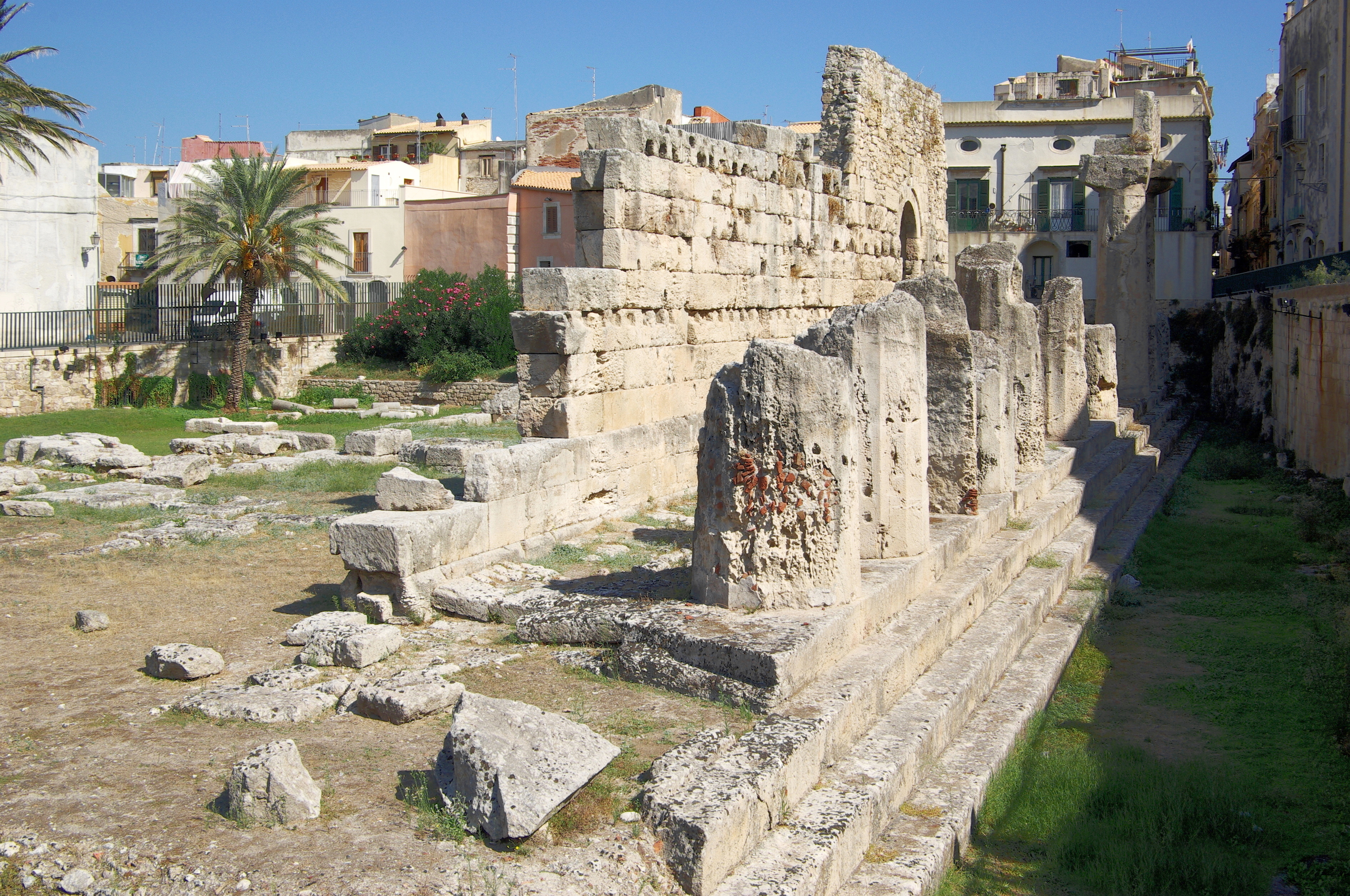
Outer columns of the stylobate with cella wall behind

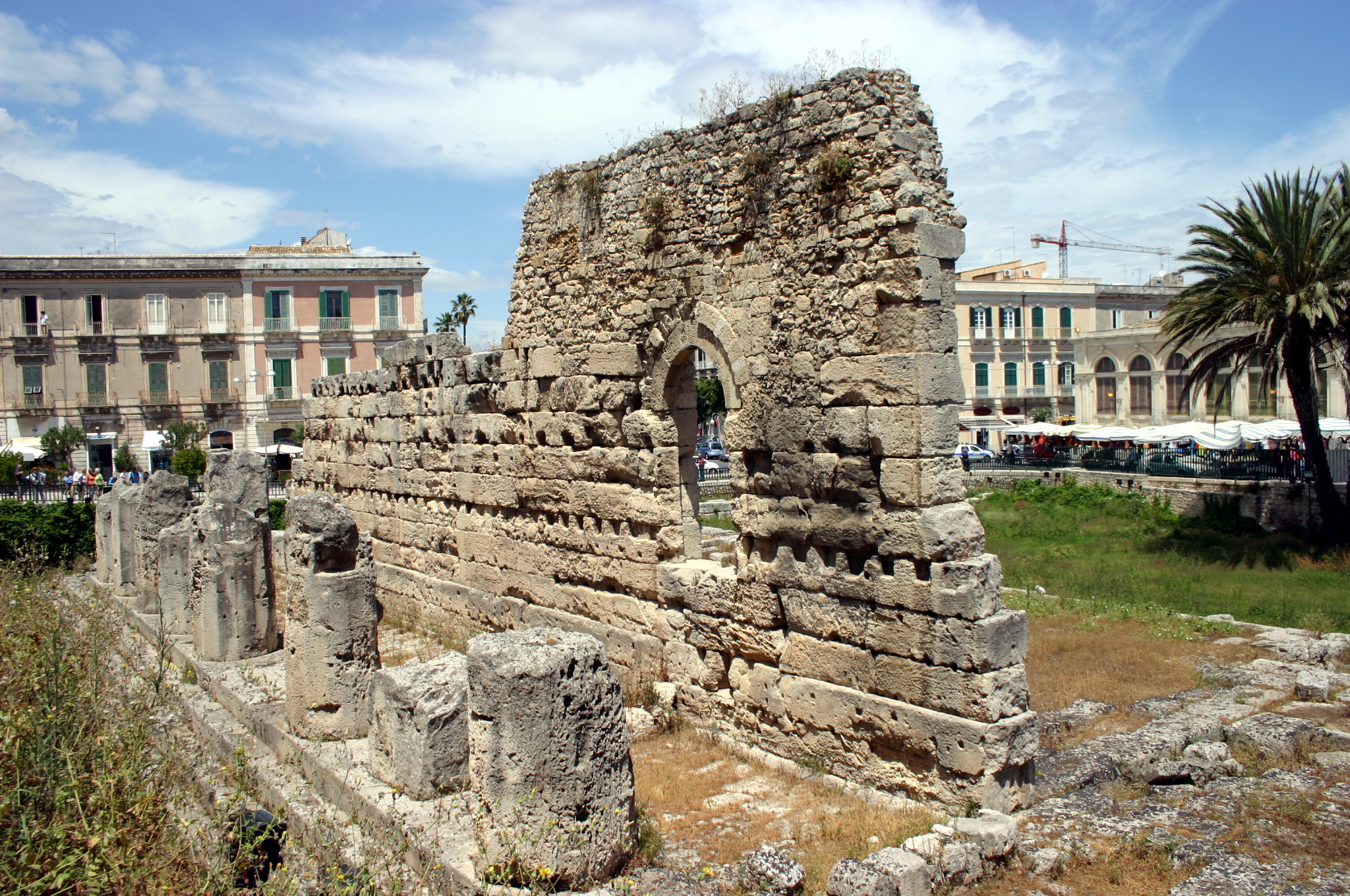
Cella wall, window likely inserted when converted into church

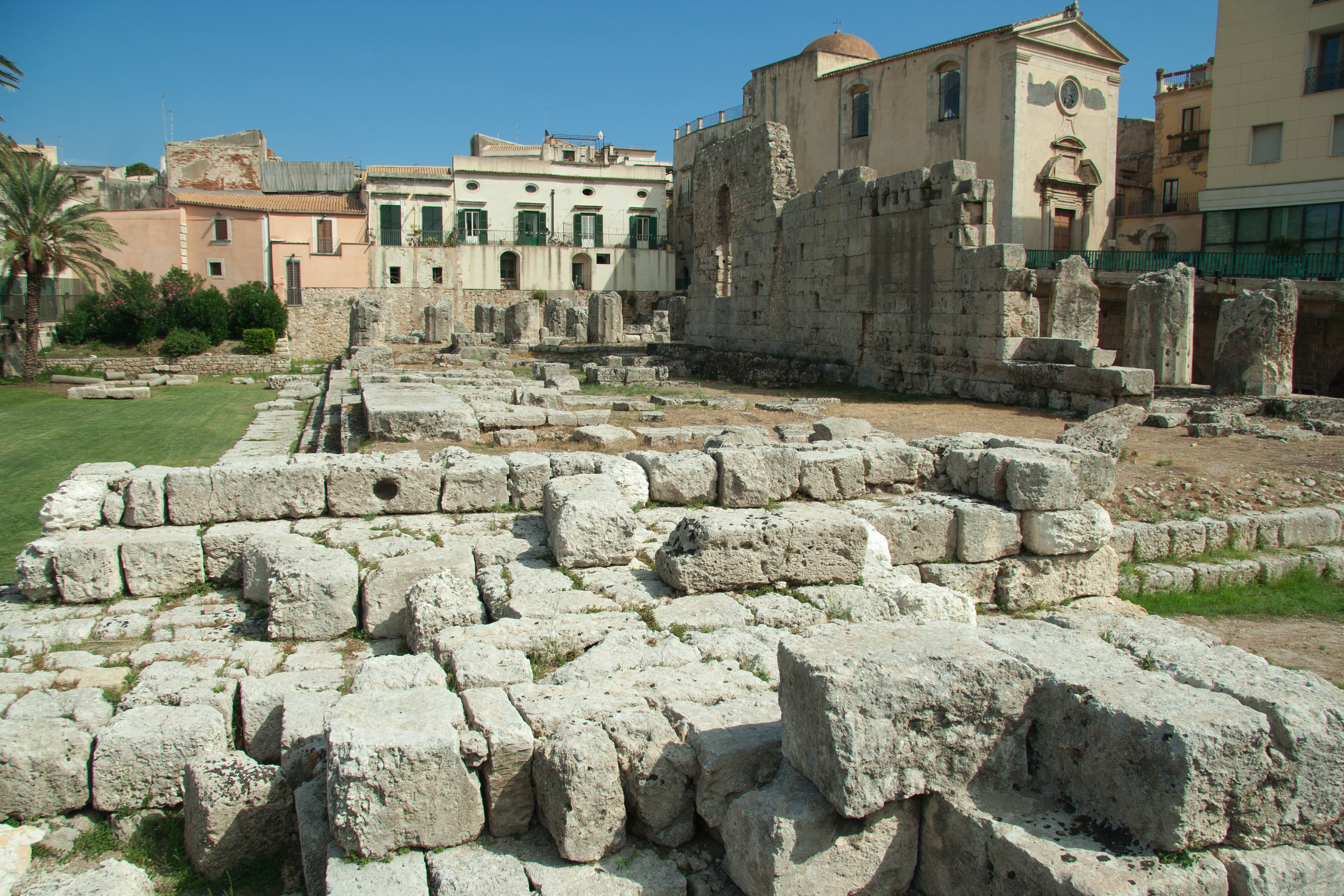
Ruins

== See also ==
- List of Ancient Greek temples
- Ancient Greek temple

== Bibliography ==
- Denon, Dominique Vivant (1993). le Promeneur (ed.). Voyage en Sicile (in French). Paris. ISBN 2-07-073283-5.
- Mertens, Dieter; Schutzenberger, Margareta. Città e monumenti dei Greci d'Occidente: dalla colonizzazione alla crisi di fine V secolo a.C.. Roma L'Erma di Bretschneider, 2006. ISBN 88-8265-367-6.
- Lippolis, Enzo; Rocco, Giorgio; Livadiotti, Monica. Architettura greca : storia e monumenti del mondo della polis dalle origini al V secolo. Milano B. Mondadori, 2007. ISBN 88-424-9220-5.
- Vecco, Marilena. L' evoluzione del concetto di patrimonio culturale, Milano F. Angeli, 2007. ISBN 88-464-8789-3.
