= Quintus Dellius =

1st-century BC Roman commander and politician

Quintus Dellius was a Roman commander and politician in the second half of the 1st century BC. His family was of equestrian rank in the Roman social system of status.

== Life ==
Seneca the Elder wrote that Marcus Valerius Messalla Corvinus called Dellius the desultor bellorum civilium ("circus-rider of civil war"), for allegedly frequently changing sides. He received this name because he deserted from Publius Cornelius Dolabella to Gaius Cassius Longinus in 43 BC, from Cassius to Mark Antony in 42 BC, and finally from Antony to Octavian in 31 BC.

For ten years in the East, Dellius served Antony, who used him mainly for diplomatic missions. In 41 BC, he travelled on Antony's orders to Alexandria to summon the Egyptian queen, Cleopatra VII, to the river Cydnus near Tarsus in Cilicia. There she was to answer for the money that she allegedly had sent to Gaius Cassius for his war against Antony and Octavian. In 40 BC, Antony sent him to Judaea to help Herod the Great with the expulsion of the usurper Antigonus. In 36 BC or 35 BC, Dellius negotiated with Herod to persuade the Jewish king to appoint the young brother of his wife Mariamne, Aristobulus, high priest. Dellius also participated in Antony's campaign against the Parthian Empire in 36 BC. Two years later he was instructed to persuade the Armenian king Artavasdes II to wed his four-year-old daughter to the six-year-old Alexander Helios, the son of Antony and Cleopatra VII. It is doubtful if this diplomatic mission was serious because soon after (34 BC) Antony marched to the Armenian capital Artaxata and arrested the Armenian king and his family.

Dellius liked to make mocking remarks and he was allegedly the matchmaker for Antony to satisfy his erotic passions. Therefore, Cleopatra despised him.

When Antony fought his last war against Octavian (31 BC), Dellius accompanied his superior to Greece, recruiting reinforcements for Antony in Macedonia and Thrace as the situation deteriorated. Just before the Battle of Actium, Dellius changed sides, and betrayed Antony's plans to Octavian. He justified his changeover due to his fear that Cleopatra VII wanted to murder him. He was held in high regard by Octavian. According to the commentator Porphyrio, the poet Horace addressed an ode (2.3) to Dellius.

== Works ==
According to Strabo, Dellius wrote a now-lost historical work (dubbed 'Bellum Parthicum') that dealt with Antony's war against Parthia, in which he had participated. Plutarch called him "Dellius the historian" (Ancient Greek: Δελλιος ὁ ἱστορικος), and cited some text Dellius had written to argue that Cleopatra's behaviour motivated him to defect to Caesar. Therefore, it is often assumed that his book was an important source for Plutarch's biography of Antony, and for the accounts of Strabo and other later historians of the Parthian campaigns of Publius Ventidius and Anthony. Otto Hirschfeld (1903) and later Santo Mazzarino (1966) instead argued that Sallust had written a victory speech for Ventidius, which would have been the main source. Leisner-Jensen (1997) concluded that their interpretation of a passing mention of just six words had been overstretched: '[A]ll these very interesting results of painstaking scholarship unfortunately are unsupported by other evidence.'

== Fictional portrayals ==
Quintus Dellius is portrayed in Colleen McCullough's Antony and Cleopatra and the play Cleopatra: A Life Unparalleled as an unprincipled friend of Mark Antony.
