= Alexander Philadelpheus =

Greek artist and archaeologist (1866–1955)

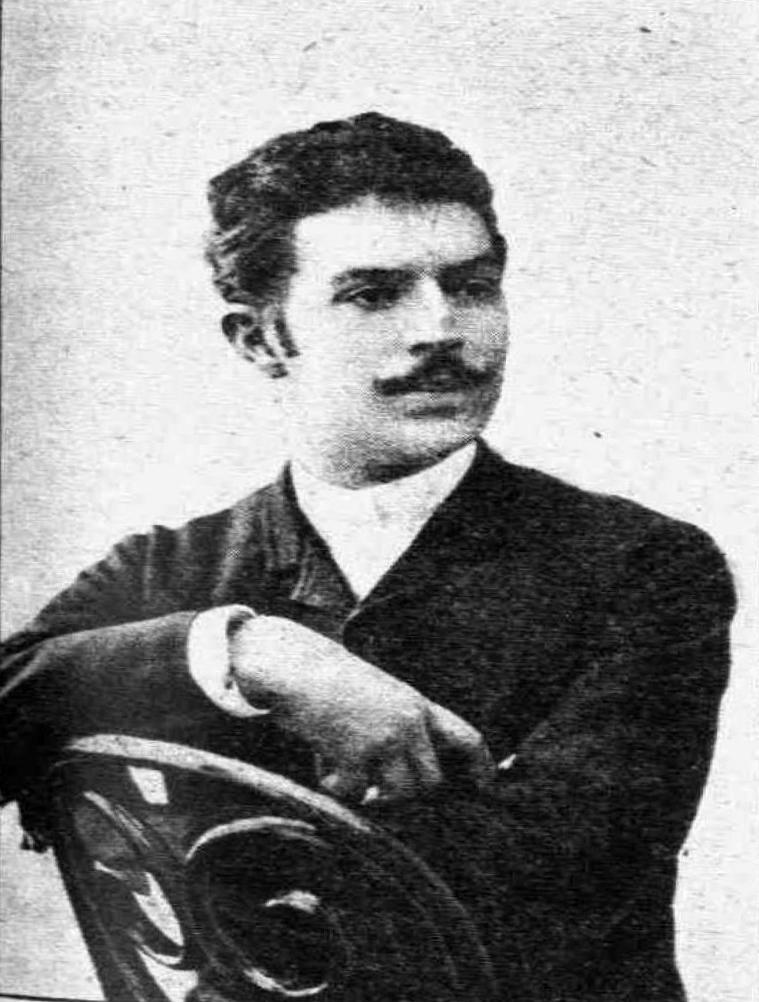
Alexander Philadelpheus, 1890

Alexander Philadelpheus (Greek: Αλέξανδρος Θ. Φιλαδελφεύς; 1866–1955) was a Greek archaeologist, historian, painter, writer and philosopher.

== Life ==
Born in Athens to an old aristocratic family, Alexander Philadelpheus displayed an exceptional interest in the arts and literature from a very young age. He was sent to Munich to study at the Munich Academy of Fine Arts as a pupil of the famous Greek painter Nikolaos Gyzis, and later continued his studies at the University of Athens before proceeding to further studies in the Universities of Paris and Rome.

In 1896 he was appointed associate professor in archaeology at the University of Athens. He was later appointed director of the Acropolis, (Acropolis Museum), Epidaurus and the National Archaeological Museum of Athens. As an Ephor of Antiquities, he directed a number of important excavations in Greece, including Nicopolis, Corinth, Hermione, Mycenae and Athens amongst others.

As an artist, he produced a number of paintings and frescoes, found both in private collections as well as churches all over Greece. As a writer, he produced poetry and literary work contributing greatly to the philosophical and cultural thought of his time. His most renowned works include the book Monuments of Athens (Μνημεία Αθηνών), published in 1924 in Greek, English and French.

He received numerous honors including, being named Knight of the Royal Order of the Saviour and Knight Commander of the Royal Order of George I, Knight Commander of the Bulgarian order of Saint Alexander, Knight Commander of the Order of the Rumanian Crown, Officer of the French Order of the Legion of Honour, Officer of the Dutch Order of Orange-Nassau and Knight of the Spanish Order of Fealty. He also received the Medal of the City of Athens and the German Olympic Decoration for his proposal of lighting the Olympic torch directly from the sun using a refractive medium, thus referring to the symbolic enlightenment of the torch directly from the ancient Greek gods.
