= Anactorium =

Ancient town of Acarnania in present-day Greece

Coordinates: 38°55′21″N 20°50′29″E

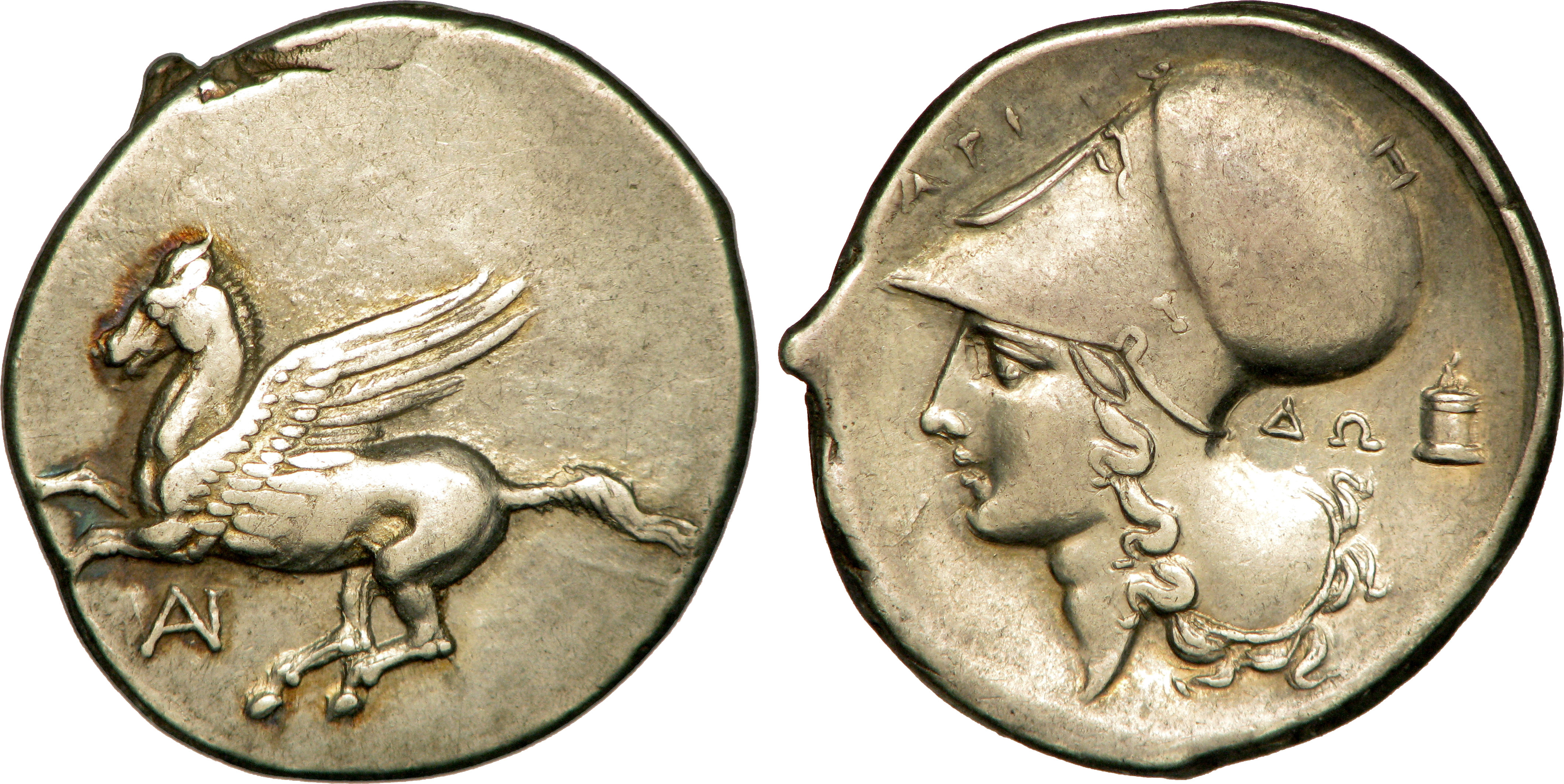
Coin of Anactorium

Anactorium or Anaktorion (Ancient Greek: Ἀνακτόριον) was a town in ancient Acarnania, situated on a promontory on the Ambraciot Gulf. On entering the Ambraciot Gulf from the Ionian Sea it was the first town in Acarnania after Actium, from which it was distant 40 stadia, and which was in the territory of Anactorium. This town was for some time one of the most important places in this part of Greece.

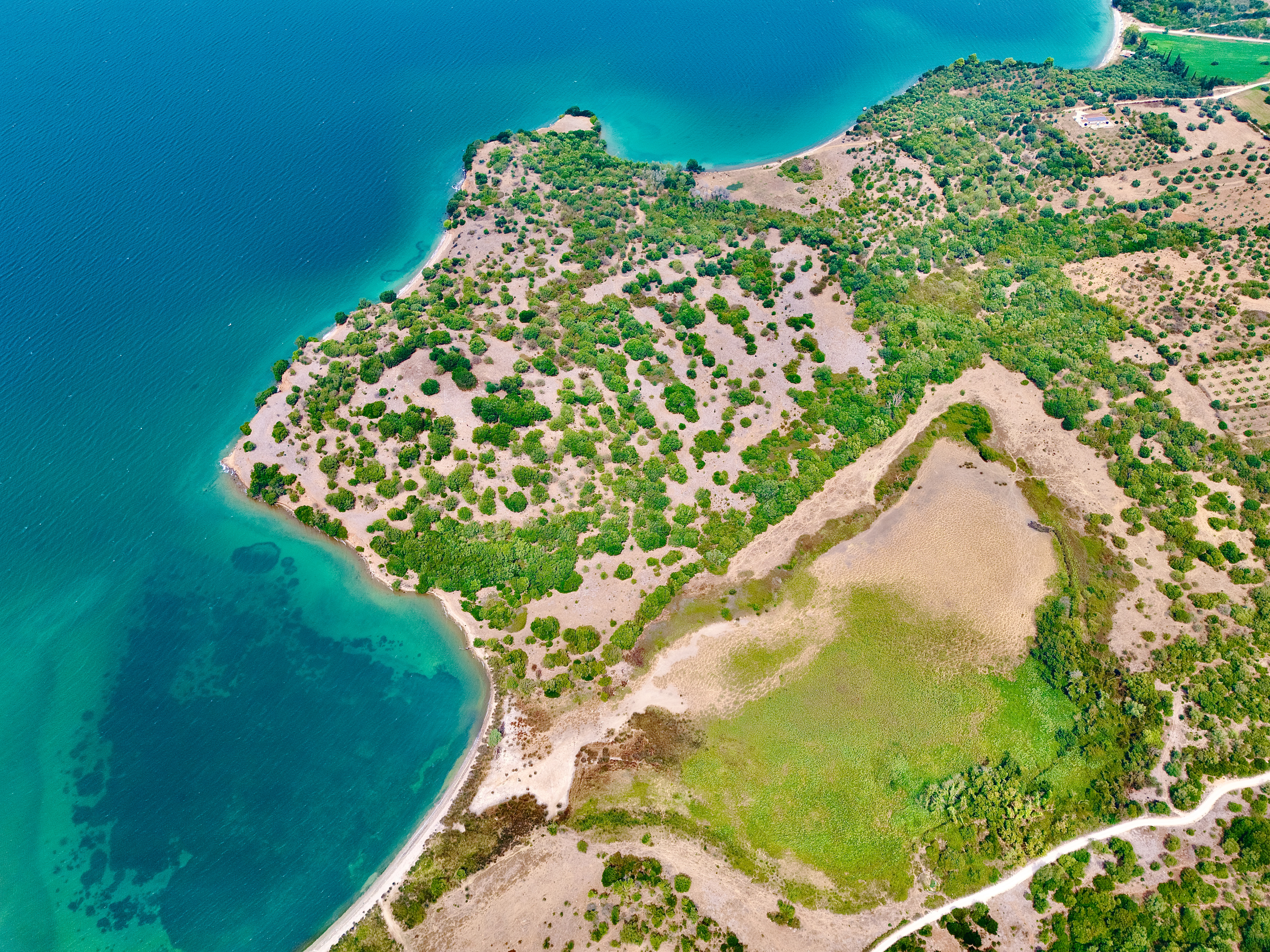
Ancient Anactorium or Anaktorion with its inlet port.

It was colonized jointly by the Corinthians and Corcyraeans; but in the war between these peoples, in 432 BCE, the Corinthians obtained sole possession of the place by fraud. It remained in the hands of the Corinthians till 425 BCE, when it was taken by the Acarnanians with the assistance of the Athenians, and the Corinthian settlers were expelled. Augustus removed its inhabitants to the town of Nicopolis, which he founded on the opposite coast of Epirus, and Strabo describes it as an emporium of the latter city.

Its site is located at Ag. Petros, near the modern Nea Kamarina.
