= Actium =

Peninsula and ancient town in Acarnania, Greece

Coordinates: 38.953°N 20.768°E

A map showing the Battle of Actium.

Actium, also known as Aktion or Aktio (Ancient Greek: Ἄκτιον, Modern Greek: Άκτιο), is a peninsula on the mouth of the Ambracian Gulf in Acarnania, Greece, and the site of an ancient town of the same name. It is most known for the Battle of Actium, in which Octavian gained his celebrated victory over Antony and Cleopatra, on September 2, 31 BC. The peninsula has been connected to Preveza in Epirus since 2002 via the Aktio–Preveza Undersea Tunnel.

== History ==
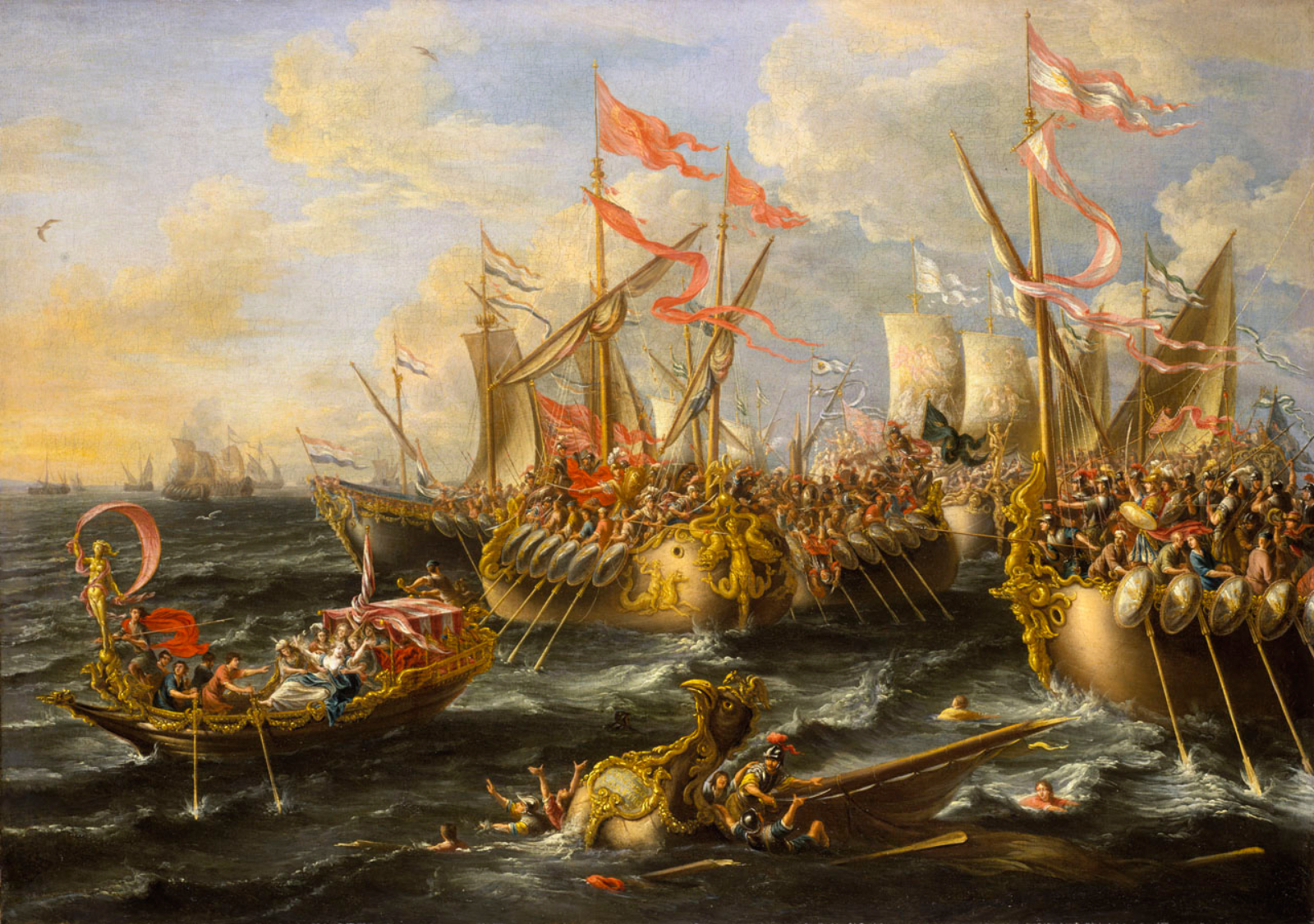
Battle of Actium by Laureys a Castro, 1672. Note anachronisms.

Actium belonged originally to the Corinthian colonists of Anactorium, who probably founded the sanctuary of Apollo Actius. This temple was of great antiquity. In the 3rd century BC it fell to the Acarnanians, who subsequently held their religious summits there.

There was also an ancient festival named Actia, celebrated here in honour of the god. Augustus after his victory enlarged the temple, and revived the ancient festival, which was henceforth celebrated once in five years (πενταετηρίς, ludi quinquennales), with musical and gymnastic contests, and horse races.

We learn from a Greek inscription found on the site of Actium, and which is probably prior to the time of Augustus, that the chief priest of the temple was called Ἱεραπόλος, and that his name was employed in official documents, like that of the first Archon at Athens, to mark the date. Strabo says that the temple was situated on an eminence, and that below was a plain with a grove of trees, and a dock-yard; and in another passage he describes the harbour as situated outside of the gulf.

On the opposite coast of Epirus, Augustus founded the city of Nicopolis in honour of his victory. After the foundation of Nicopolis, a few buildings sprang up around the temple, and it served as a kind of suburb to Nicopolis.

== Archaeology ==
On October 8, 1980, the Greek Ministry of Transport and Communications reported that shipwrecks from the Battle of Actium had been located at Actium near the entrance to the Ambracan Gulf.

In Summer 2009, archaeologists discovered the ruins of the Temple of Apollo and found two statue heads, one of Apollo, one of Artemis (Diana).

== Aktio–Preveza Undersea Tunnel ==
The peninsula is connected via an underwater tunnel to the city of Preveza in Epirus, on the opposite side of the mouth of the Ambracian Gulf. The total length of the tunnel is 1,570 metres (5,150 ft), of which 909 metres (2,982 ft) are located underwater. It was completed in 2002.

== See also ==
- Battle of Actium
- List of ancient Greek cities
- Preveza, the nearest modern town, connected by a 1.5 km long tunnel
