= Lysimachia (disambiguation) =

Lysimachia is a genus of flowering plants.

Lysimachia or Lysimacheia or Lysimachea may also refer to:

- Lysimachia (Aetolia), a town of ancient Aetolia, Greece
- Lysimachia (Mysia), a town of ancient Mysia, now in Turkey
- Lysimachia (Thrace), a town of ancient Thrace, now in Turkey
- Lake Lysimachia, a lake in Aetolia-Acarnania, Greece
