= Acrae (Aetolia) =

Coordinates: 38°30′13″N 21°34′56″E

Acrae or Akrai (Ancient Greek: Ἄκραι) was a town of ancient Aetolia, on the road from Metapa to Conope. Stephanus of Byzantium erroneously calls it an Acarnanian town.

Its site is located the acropolis of modern Pappadates.
