= Nicopolis =

Ancient city founded by Octavian after battle of Actium

- Νικόπολις (Greek)
- Actia Nicopolis
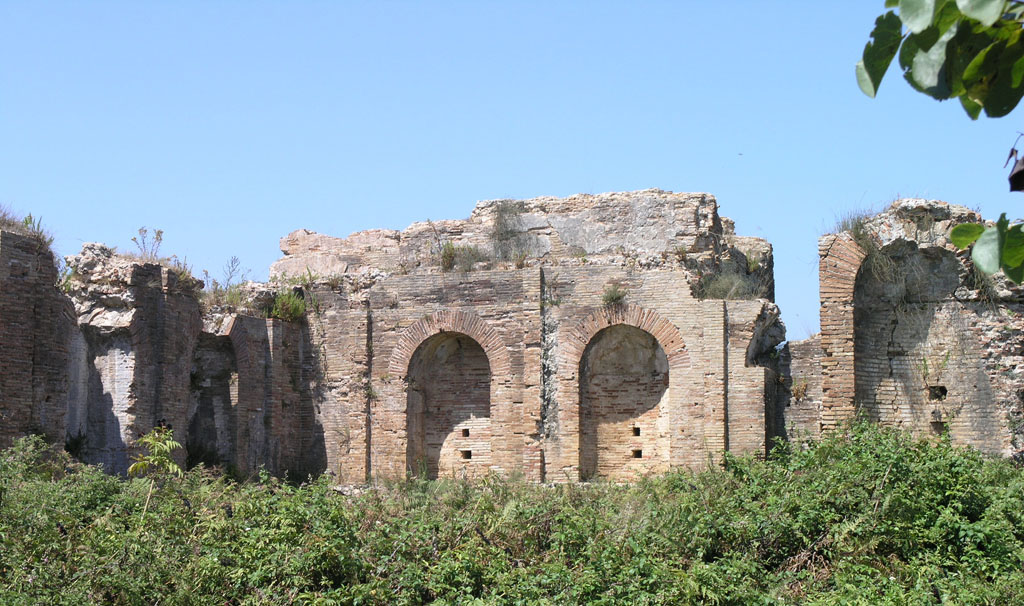
- The Roman nymphaeum of Nicopolis

- Location within Greece
- 39°00′30″N 20°44′01″E
- Type: Settlement
- Location: Preveza, Epirus, Greece
- Region: Epirus

History
- Built: 29 BC
- Built by: Octavian

Site notes
- Condition: Ruined
- Owner: Public
- Management: 33rd Ephorate of Prehistoric and Classical Antiquities
- Public access: Yes
- Website: Hellenic Ministry of Culture and Tourism

Nicopolis (Ancient Greek: Νικόπολις, romanized: Nikópolis, lit. 'City of Victory') or Actia Nicopolis was the capital city of the Roman province of Epirus. Its site, near Preveza, Greece, still contains impressive ruins. The city was founded in 29 BC by Octavian in commemoration of his victory in 31 BC over Antony and Cleopatra at the Battle of Actium nearby. It flourished through commerce and imperial patronage, obtaining its capital status in the early second century AD when Trajan created the province of Epirus. Nicopolis survived the turmoil of the third century and was made capital of a different, smaller province, Epirus Vetus, during the reforms of Diocletian.

Bishops of Nicopolis appear in the historical record as early as the reign of Constantine, but Christianity did not predominate in the region until the late fourth century. A series of basilicas were constructed during the ensuing period. Between the reigns of Zeno and Justinian Nicopolis was repeatedly damaged by warfare, declining in size and receiving new fortifications. The city died out sometime after the eighth century. Its site was first discovered and excavated by Greek archaeologist Alexander Philadelpheus.

== History ==
=== Foundation ===
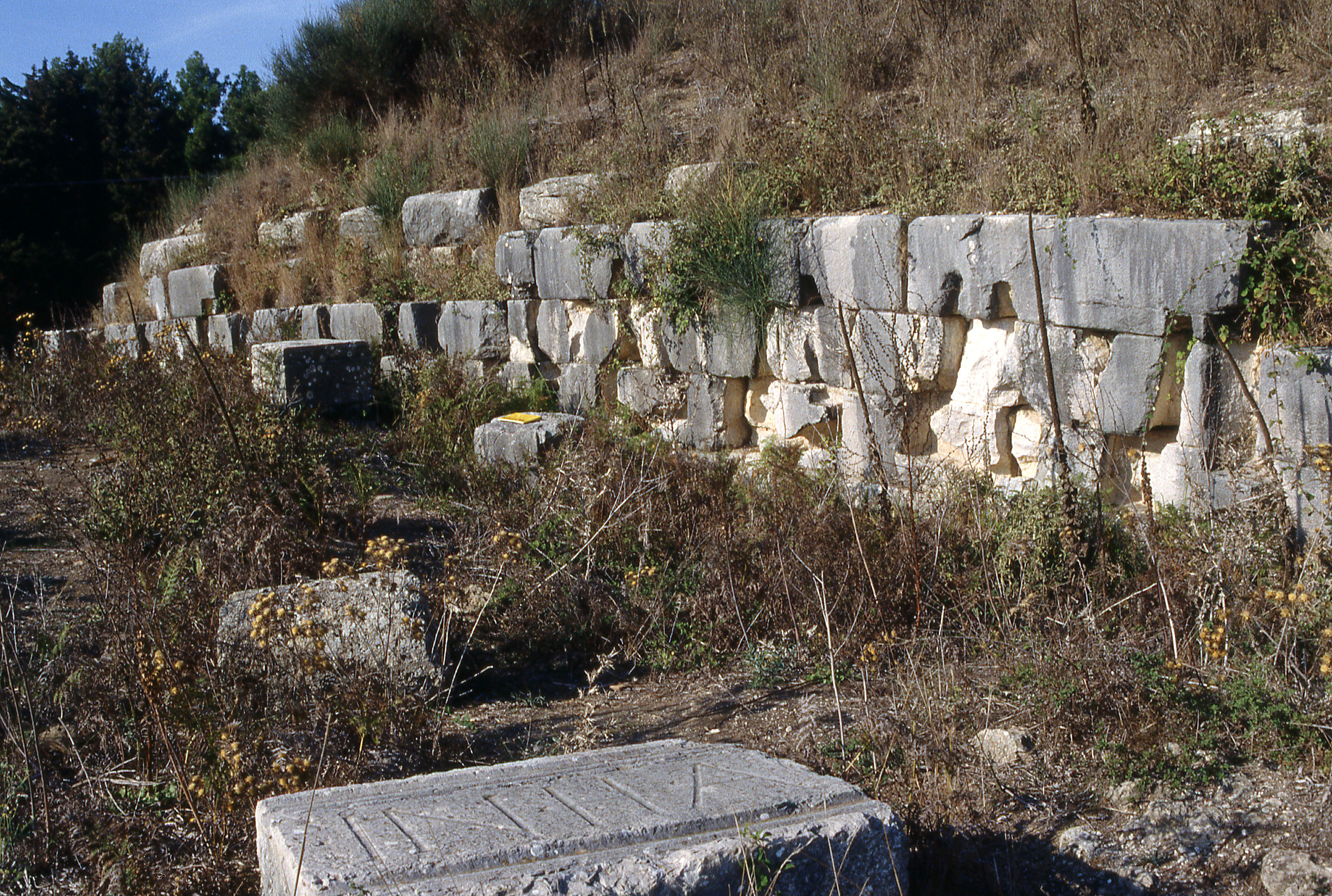
Octavian's campsite memorial at Actium: terrace wall with cuttings for rostra (bronze rams) taken from Antony's warships

Map of Roman cities founded in Greece.

In 29 BC, 2 years after his victory in the naval battle of Actium, Octavian founded a new city which he called Nicopolis (the City of Victory), located on the southernmost promontory of Epirus, and across the mouth of the harbour from the ancient town of Actium. This foundation echoed a tradition dating back to Alexander the Great, and more recently illustrated by Pompey, founder of Nicopolis in Little Armenia (63 BC). Symbolically, the new city represented one example of his successful unification of the Roman Empire under one administration. Geographically, it constituted a major transportation and communications link between the eastern and western halves of the Mediterranean. Economically, it served to reorganise and revitalise the region, which had never recovered from its destruction by Lucius Aemilius Paullus Macedonicus in the Third Macedonian War (171–167 BC), or the further destruction under Sulla in 87–86 BC. It also established an important commercial centre and port at this strategic position on the Mediterranean sea routes.

On a hill north of Nicopolis where his own tent had been pitched, and north of the present village of Nicopolis (also known as Smyrtoula), Octavian also built a monument and sanctuary to Apollo, considered his patron god, and trophies to two other gods, Neptune and Mars for their contribution to its victory. This monument was adorned with the rams of captured galleys. In further celebration of his victory he instituted the quadrennial Actian games in honour of Apollo Actius.

In 27 BC, Octavian implemented an Empire-wide administrative reform. The new polis was considered capital of the territories of southern Epirus including Ambracia, most of Akarnania, and western Aetolia. Many inhabitants of the surrounding areas – Kassopaia, Ambracia, parts of Acarnania (including Leukas, Palairos, Amphilochian Argos, Calydon, and Lysimachia) and western Aetolia – were forced to relocate to the new city. Among other things, it obtained the right to send five representatives to the Amphictyonic Council. As a city in a senatorial province, Nicopolis began minting its own copper coins (until 268).

During the first five years or so of the city's foundation, local authorities supervised the construction of the city walls, the majority of the public buildings, including the theatre, stadium, gymnasium, odeion, and the aqueduct. The city's western gate was connected by a road to the Ionian harbour Komaros. The city eventually occupied a site of around 375 acres.

Although the exact legal status of Nicopolis is the subject of some dispute, unlike other Roman foundations in Greece contemporary with Nicopolis such as Patras, Philippi and, also in Epirus, Buthrotum and Epidamnus, the city was not, or was not only, a Roman colony (implying that Roman military veterans also settled there) but also a free city (civitas libera Nicopolitana) i.e. a polis (Greek city), free and autonomous, having the characteristics of civitas libera and civitas foederata, linked to Rome by a treaty (foedus).

"Location of the Greek cities participating in synoecism of Nicopolis"

=== 1st century ===
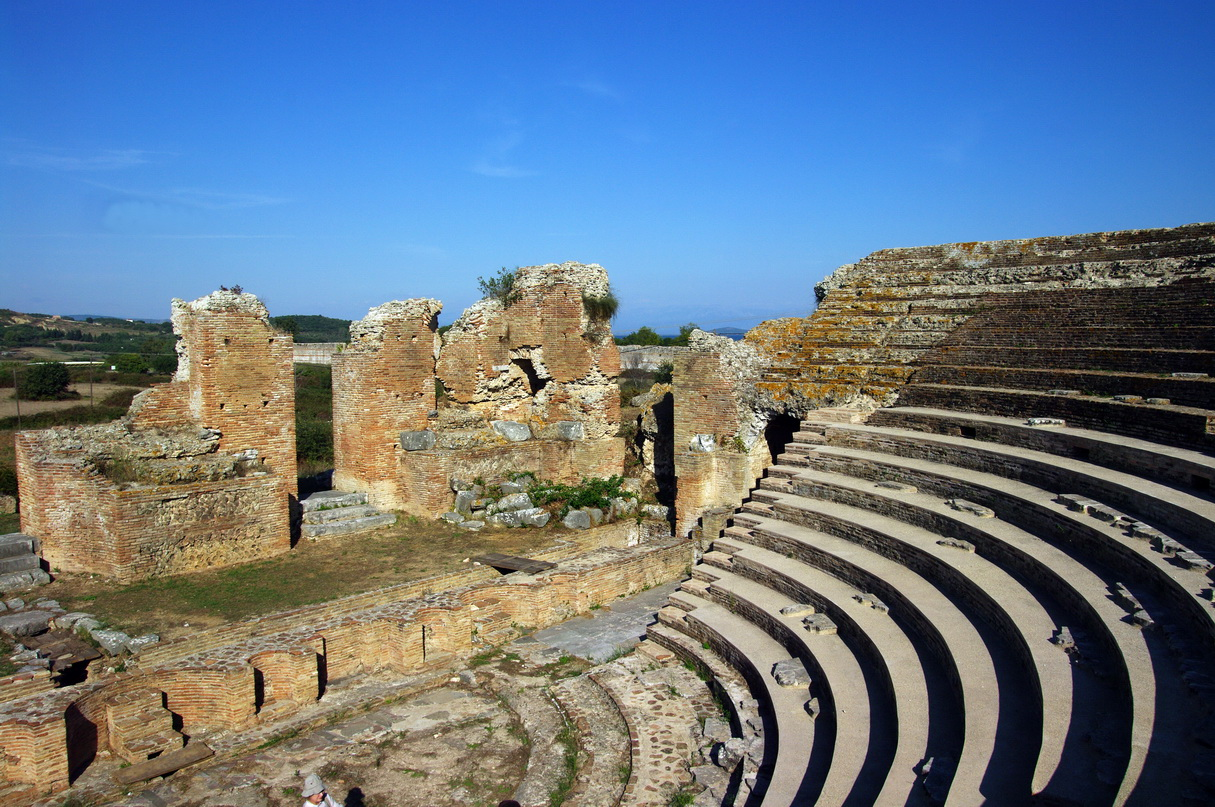
The ancient Odeon.

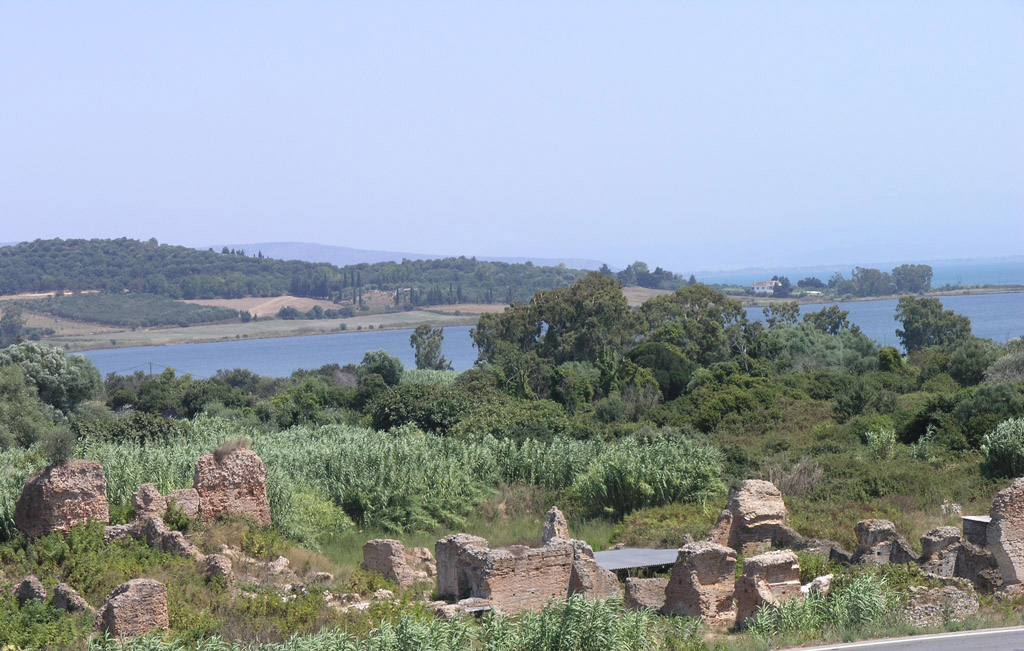
The central thermae of Nicopolis.

Thus provided with considerable assets by its founder, the new city developed rapidly in Roman times; Augustus adorned it with monuments financed by the spoils of war, but it also owes much to the patronage of Herod the Great. The two ports, one on the Amvrakikos Gulf, probably Vathy, modern day Margarona Bay, and one at Komaros on the Ionian Sea (Fig. 4), near modern day Mythikas harbour, ensured the commercial development of the city which was built on the Roman orthogonal grid distinguished by its considerable size (about 180 ha).

Germanicus, nephew and adopted son of Augustus, visited the city en route to Syria and celebrated his second consulship there in 18 AD. In 30–31, the Roman consul Poppaeus Sabinus visited Nicopolis.

In the winter of 65–66, the Apostle Paul decided to spend the winter at Nicopolis and in his Epistle to Titus 3:12 invited his co-worker Titus to join him there from Crete. Apparently a Christian community existed in the city.

In 66, in the wake of a terror campaign and financial constraints in Rome, Emperor Nero made a more modest trip to Greece in lieu of a planned great journey to the east. He visited Nicopolis during his tour of Greece to take part in the Actian games and was crowned winner of the chariot race, as is indicated on coins minted in Nicopolis in his honor.

Around 94 Emperor Domitian expelled philosophers from Rome, including the prominent Stoic philosopher Epictetus of Hierapolis, who went to Nicopolis and founded his own school. In the reign of Trajan the school's students included Arrian, whose notes preserved the teachings of Epictetus into the modern age. Epictetus died in Nicopolis around AD 135.

=== 2nd century ===
Around 110, under Emperor Trajan, the Roman government carved out parts of Macedonia and Achaia to make a separate province of Epirus. It had been decided that the territory needed a stricter government to yield higher revenues. The new province included Acarnania to the south as far as the Achelous, but not Apollonia to the north, plus the Ionian Islands – Corfu, Leukas, Ithaca, Cephalonia, and Zacynthus. It was governed by a procurator Augusti headquartered at Nicopolis, together with other special procuratores, including a procurator of the purple fisheries, whose sphere of office, however, extended to Achaea and Thessaly. This administrative set up appears to have remained intact through the reforms of Emperor Septimius Severus (193–211) and up until Emperor Diocletian (284–305).

In 128, Emperor Hadrian visited Nicopolis with his wife Vibia Sabina during his second voyage to the East (128–134). The imperial couple were received with the highest honours: small altars in the city attest to the worship of Hadrian and Sabina, respectively assimilated to Zeus Dodonaios, the most important deity of Epirus, and Artemis Kelkaia, a manifestation of the goddess unknown outside Nicopolis. Hadrian took advantage of his stay to build a temple to his late protégé, Antinous.

Around this time the city's western gate was constructed, several hundred metres north of the south gate, becoming the main gate of Nicopolis.

Around 180, the next mention of Nicopolis in Church history concerns a bishop of Rome, Pope Eleutherius, who reigned from around 174–189. He was born in Nicopolis, according to the Liber Pontificalis, and served as a deacon in Rome. During his term in office as Bishop of Rome, the Church was involved in the Montanist controversy.

Around 193–198, Emperor Septimius Severus, based in Syria, campaigned in Mesopotamia, with indirect consequences for Achaea and Epirus: to help pay for these campaigns, Severus apparently required several cities to mint special coins, including Nicopolis, Patrae, Epidaurus, Apollonia, Thuria, Plautilla, and the Thessalian koinon.

General plan of Nicopolis.

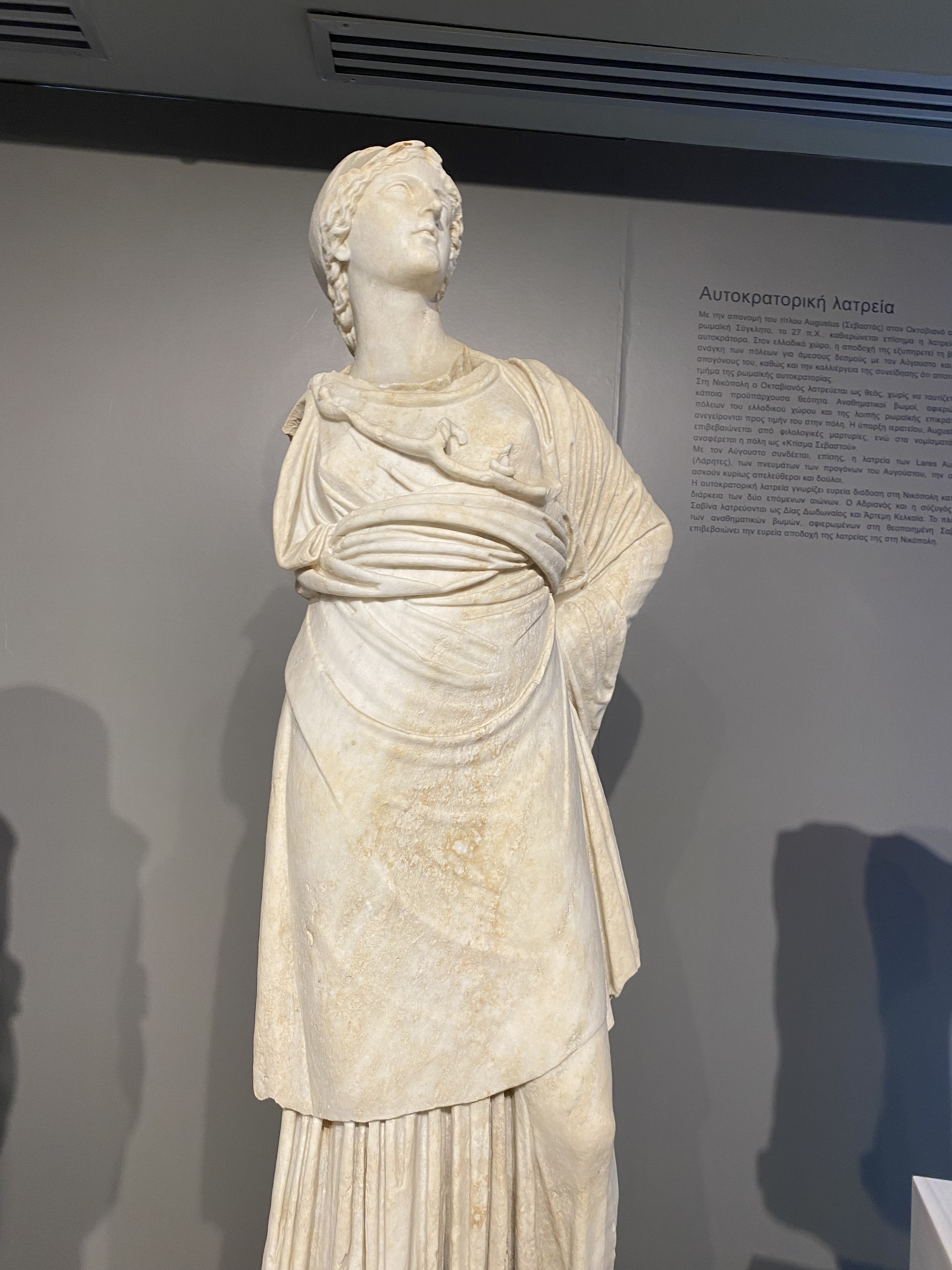
Athena from Nikopolis

=== Later Roman and Byzantine period ===
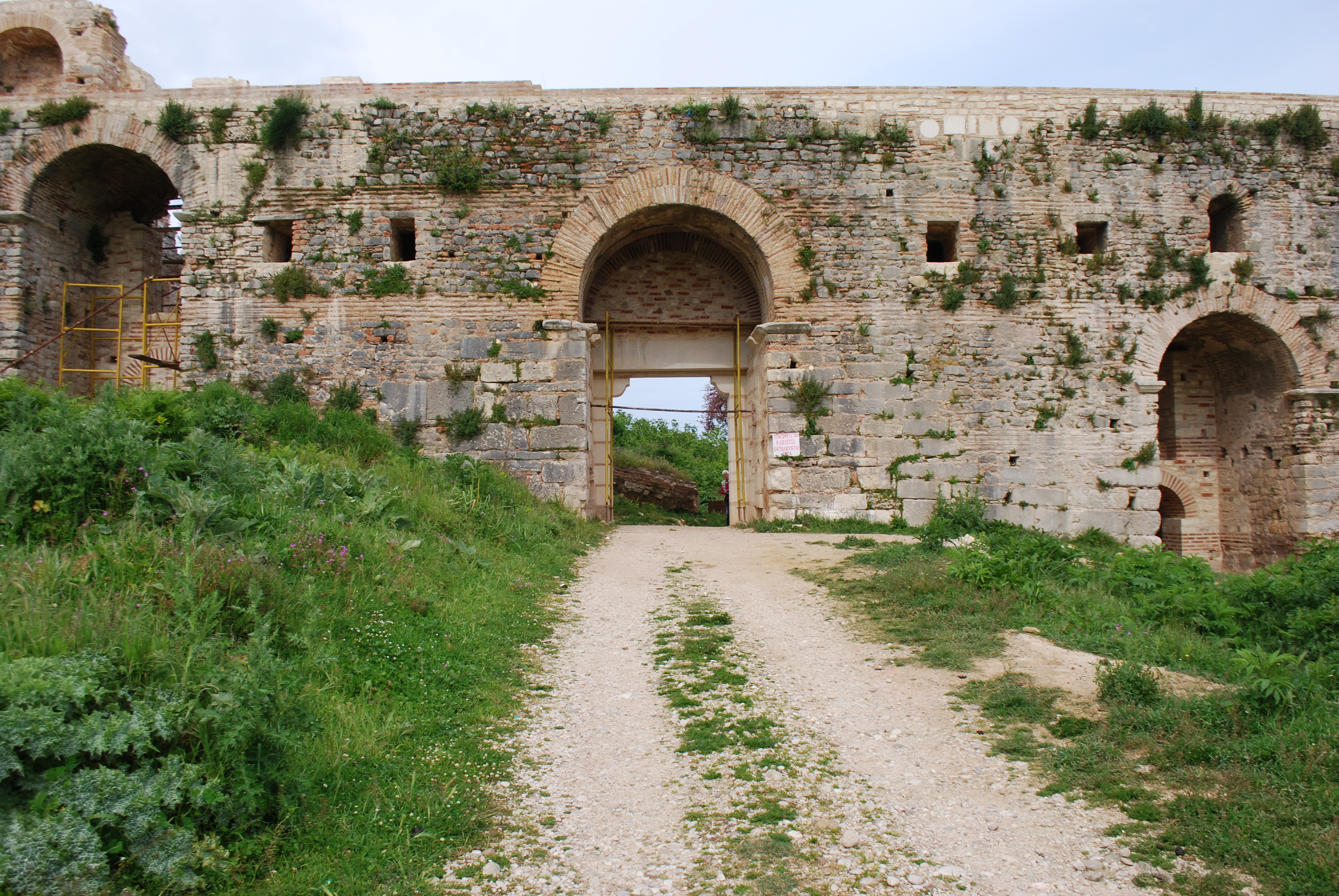
Ancient gates

The late third century was a time of troubles for the whole Empire: the city was attacked by the Goths and Heruli, but managed to avoid looting thanks to makeshift fortifications.

In 268, the Goths launched a combined land-sea invasion against the Roman Empire, assisted by Heruli sailors and other tribesmen. Their naval forces ravaged Byzantium and Chrysopolis, though the imperial fleet successfully counter-attacked on the Propontis. Meanwhile, the land forces overran Thrace and continued into Achaea as far south as Sparta; the invading Goths and Heruli sacked Athens, crossed the isthmus, sacked and burned the lower part of Corinth, and advanced to Argos and Sparta, ravaging the countryside along the way and burning the two cities. Here imperial land and sea forces counter-attacked, and the invaders wandered their way through Boeotia, Acarnania, Epirus, Macedonia, and Thrace on their way back to Moesia.

In Epirus, while the inhabitants of Nicopolis made hasty repairs to fortifications and managed to avert the danger, the leaders of Corfu organised their own army, crossed over into Epirus and defeated the Goths on land.

The Roman army chased the Goths and their allies and defeated them at Naissus. It seems that the city then lost much of its importance and reputation by becoming only a provincial centre. In 293, as part of Diocletian's reforms, the province of Epirus became known as Epirus Vetus (including Adrianopolis, Phoenice, Onchesmos, and Buthrotum as the most northerly major cities, and Acarnania and the islands of Corfu, Ithaca, and probably Leucas to the south). The capital was Nicopolis.

Meanwhile, the territory of northern Epirus (including, Apollonia, Byllis and Amantia on its southern borders) became known as Epirus Nova, with the capital at Dyrrachium. Both provinces, along with Macedonia, Thessaly and Achaea, were included in the diocese of Moesia, which also included four provinces in the northwestern Balkans. The islands of Cephalonia, Zacynthus, and Cythera were included in the province of Achaea.

Both Epirus Vetus and Epirus Nova were governed by a praeses.

Writing around 300, one Arnobius of Numidia mentioned the existence of Christian communities in Achaea, Macedonia, and Epirus.

In about 330, the first great recorded Church historian Eusebius of Caesarea mentions that bishops from Epirus attended the first Ecumenical Council of Nicaea in 325. This implies that bishoprics and an episcopal administrative system had been set up some time before 325. Until the time of Constantine, it is supposed that the bishopric of Nicopolis came under the jurisdiction of the metropolitan of Corinth, but with the administrative reforms under Emperor Diocletian and Constantine (306–337), Nicopolis itself became the metropolitan city of Epirus Vetus. Eusebius also mentions that Origen of Alexandria went to Nicopolis in the first half of the third century and discovered a rare Greek translation of the Old Testament.

In 327, Emperor Constantine split the diocese of Moesia into Dacia and Macedonia. The two provinces of Epirus, along with the provinces of Macedonia, Thessaly, and Achaia, became part of the diocese of Macedonia (capital Thessalonica).

In 343, in the Acts of the Council of Sardica, we have the first mention by name of a bishop of Nicopolis, one Isidoros.

In 361, newly appointed Consul and rhetorician Claudius Mamertinus delivered a panegyric to the young Emperor Julian (360–363), mentioning heavy taxation in Dalmatia and Epirus. He emphasised the destruction of some of the most important monuments while congratulating the Emperor for his restoration work.

=== Christian Nicopolis ===
Based on the record of Julian's close ties with certain leading men from Epirus involved in the Empire-wide cultural circuit led by Libanius and Themistius, it appears that Christianity was not widespread in Epirus in the mid-4th century (and as part of his pagan policy, Julian reactivated support of the Actian games), but after his death it spread far and wide in the region, judging from legislation issued by Valentinian in 371 and 372, trying to offset some negative effects of its rapid spread, and the fact that there is no written record of the bishops of the cities of Epirus until the 5th century, except for the bishop of Nicopolis in 343.

The Acts of the Council of Constantinople in 381, as well as of the Third (431) and Fourth (451) Ecumenical Councils, recognized the see of Thessalonica as holding sixth place in the Church administrative hierarchy, after the five patriarchs. Among the sees of Illyricum, Thessalonica held the first position in the hierarchy, followed by Corinth and Nicopolis.

In 431, the Acts of the Third Ecumenical Council at Ephesus list the bishops of Epirus, including metropolitan Bishop Donatus of Nicopolis (c. 425–432).

Atticus Bishop of Nicopolis was an attendee at Council of Chalcedon.

The majority of the bishops from Epirus and Illyricum and other representatives upheld the Orthodox theological position of the Bishop Celestine I of Rome (422–432) and Bishop Cyril of Alexandria against the Patriarch of Constantinople Nestorius. During this time, Bishop Donatus of Nicopolis maintained a correspondence with Bishop Cyril of Alexandria concerning Nestorianism.

In 451, six Epirote bishops attended the Fourth Ecumenical Council at Chalcedon, including Bishop Atticus of Nicopolis. All these bishops without exception signed the Council's decisions in favor of the Orthodox position of Dyophysitism, also backed by the bishop of Rome.

In 457-458 the bishops of Epirus then held a provincial synod to ratify the validity of the Fourth Ecumenical Council. We have a list of as many as nine bishops signing a letter written by Bishop Eugenius of Nicopolis to Pope Leo I of Rome.

This was also the time of Bishop Diadochos of Photiki (c. 450–458), a saint and Father of the Church. Not only was he the bishop of what was the capital of a wider district called Thesprotia, he was also the author of important theological treatises, three of which are extant.

In combination with the notice of the correspondence between the bishop of Nicopolis and the bishop of Alexandria mentioned previously, from the writings of Diadochos we can infer that learned texts, along with amphorae, traveled between the eastern Mediterranean and Epirus in the 5th century.

Diadochos’ texts also show us that both theoretical and practical ideas about theology and the organization of monastic life also spread from the eastern Mediterranean to Epirus. In fact, a reference in one of Diadochos’ own writings suggests he was also the hegumen of a monastery in Photiki and that Epirus in the 450s at least had both anchoretic and coenobitic monastic communities.

From around 460, a series of six basilicas were built, beginning with the five-aisled metropolitan basilica B. Artisans decorated many of the basilicas with high-quality mosaics, developing their own workshop, and operating until the 550s. Their influence extended to the rest of Epirus and perhaps further afield in eastern Illyricum.

Basilica B was the largest of the Nicopolis basilicas and probably served as the metropolitan bishop's main church. An inscription informs us that Bishop Alcison (491-516) sponsored some additions to the southern annex of Basilica B, possibly around 500.

In 474, Emperor Zeno initiated peace negotiations with the Vandals. But during the negotiations, in order to strengthen their position, the Vandals again devastated the coast of Greece during which they captured Nicopolis and took prisoners who had to be ransomed to secure their release.

Evidently the walls of Nicopolis built in the time of Augustus were not for defensive purposes, or at least were not functioning in 474, since the Vandals took the city apparently without being equipped with siege tools, while they failed to take the walled city of Taenarum. If this is so, the walls of Nicopolis attributed to Justinian, enclosing only one-sixth of the city founded by Augustus, were erected not before 474. In any case, the Nicopolis walls, probably of the 480s-510s period (like those of Dyrrachium), were made of bricks, mortar, and rubble.

This raid and prisoner-taking probably had a devastating effect on the infrastructure of Nicopolis and the mentality of its citizens, affecting the city's social and economic life. It is probably directly related to the reduction of the city's population to one-sixth of what it had been, confining it to the north-east section, the area where the citadel stood, and fortifying it with thick walls to provide better defence.

Around 500, as mentioned, Bishop Alcison (491–516), an opponent of the Monophysite policy of Emperor Anastasius, supervised the addition of annexes to the five-aisled metropolitan basilica B, which has taken his name.

Around 515, the three-aisled basilica Δ, with fragments of floor mosaics, was built.

In 516, all eight bishops of Vetus Epirus held a synod and elected Ioannes as successor to the martyred Bishop Alcison. Bishop Ioannes sent a deacon, Rufinus, with a letter to Pope Hormisdas, reaffirming their steadfastness in the Orthodox faith. The synod appears to be the seventh local episcopal synod for Epirus Vetus.

In 551, King Totila of the Ostrogoths, in response to reports of a Byzantine military build-up in the eastern side of the Adriatic, sent a 300-strong fleet to Corfu. The Ostrogoths sacked it and nearby islands. They also sacked the area around Dodoni inland and Nicopolis, and captured several Byzantine ships on their way to bring supplies to Narses.

Around 555, according to Procopius, Emperor Justinian renovated the fortifications of Nicopolis, as part of his huge program involving the renewal of city fortifications and the erection of new defences.

Construction of the three-aisled Basilica Α, decorated with an extensive series of extant floor mosaics. was begun. Bishop Dumetius I also made some additions (the pastophoria) to Basilica B, and the three-aisled basilica Ε, near the southern harbor Magaronas, was built.

Around 575, the three-aisled basilica Γ was built and Basilica Α was completed under Bishop Dumetius II.

In 587, the Avars allied with Slavic tribes invaded Thrace, Macedonia and Achaua, including Thessaly, Attica, Euboia, and Peloponnesos, as well as Epirus Vetus, where the invasion seems to have reached as far as Euroea, but not Cassope and Nicopolis.

In 625, Pope Honorius I sent a letter to Metropolitan Hypatius of Nicopolis referring to the difficult travel conditions that prevented the bishop from reaching Rome.

=== Middle Ages to present ===
The province of Epirus Vetus, of which Nicopolis was the capital, was part of the western patriarchate as arranged by Justinian I and was directly subject to the jurisdiction of the pope; but, about 732, Leo the Isaurian made it subject to the patriarch of Constantinople because of the pope's resistance to the emperor's iconoclastic policy.

The last known bishop of Nicopolis was Anastasius, who attended the Ecumenical Council of 787. Soon afterwards, owing to the decadence into which Nicopolis fell, the metropolitan see was transferred to Naupactus, which subsequently figured as such in the Notitiae episcopatuum.

In the course of the Middle Ages Nicopolis was supplanted by the town of Preveza.

In 1798 French Revolutionary troops, stationed in Preveza by Napoleon, dug into the graves and ruins of ancient Nicopolis and looted various treasures. These were later taken by the troops of Ali Pasha, who defeated the French and their Greek allies.

Various battles fought in this area, the latest in 1912, when it was captured by the Greek army during the First Balkan War, have been named "Battle of Nicopolis" rather than "Battle of Preveza".

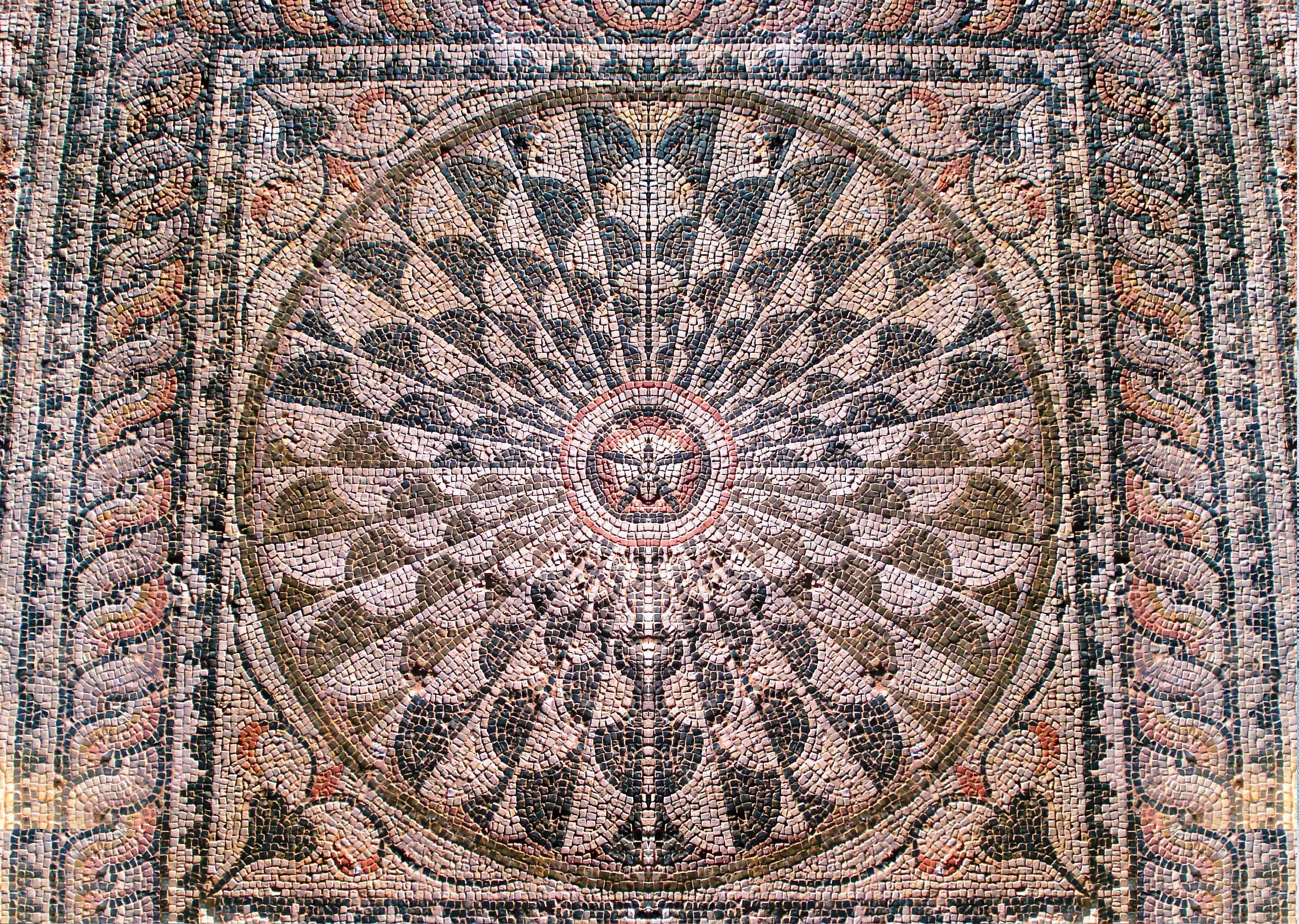
Mosaic from the Roman villa of Manius Antoninus

== Archaeology ==
The ruins of Nicopolis, now known as Palaea Preveza ("Old Preveza"), lie about 5 km north of the town, on a small bay of the Gulf of Arta (Sinus Ambracius) at the narrowest part of the isthmus of the peninsula which separates the Gulf from the Ionian Sea. The site was briefly excavated by John Papadimitriou in 1940. Besides the Acropolis, the most conspicuous features are:

- The Actium monument of Augustus
- a theatre ( with 77 rows of seats)
- an Odeon
- large sections of the original walls

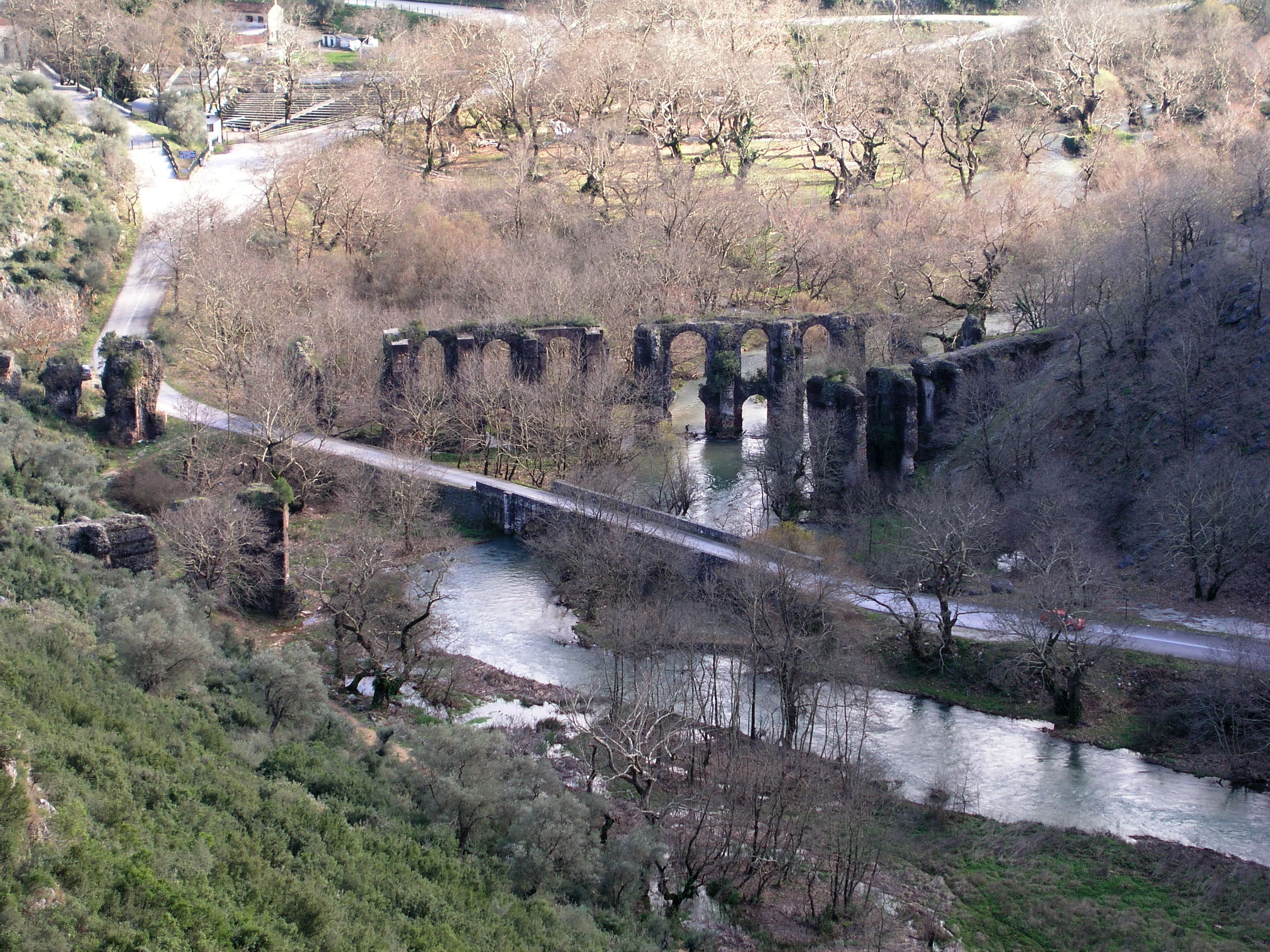
Aqueduct at Agios Georgios

- an aqueduct which brought water to the town from the Louros river over a distance of about 50 km./30 mi. The aqueduct bridge over the river downstream from the source is one of the very few remaining in Greece today. The water was finally brought to the Nymphaeum in the city which also contained a header tank from where it was further distributed. Remains of the aqueduct in several forms of construction are visible in the regions of Thesprotiko, Louros, Stefani-Oropos, Archangelos and Nicopolis. Recent research has assigned its construction to Hadrian's rule, in the 2nd century AD. Ancient sources mention that in the 4th C AD the aqueduct needed several repairs which were undertaken by Emperor Julian. The Aqueduct ceased to operate in the mid 5th century.

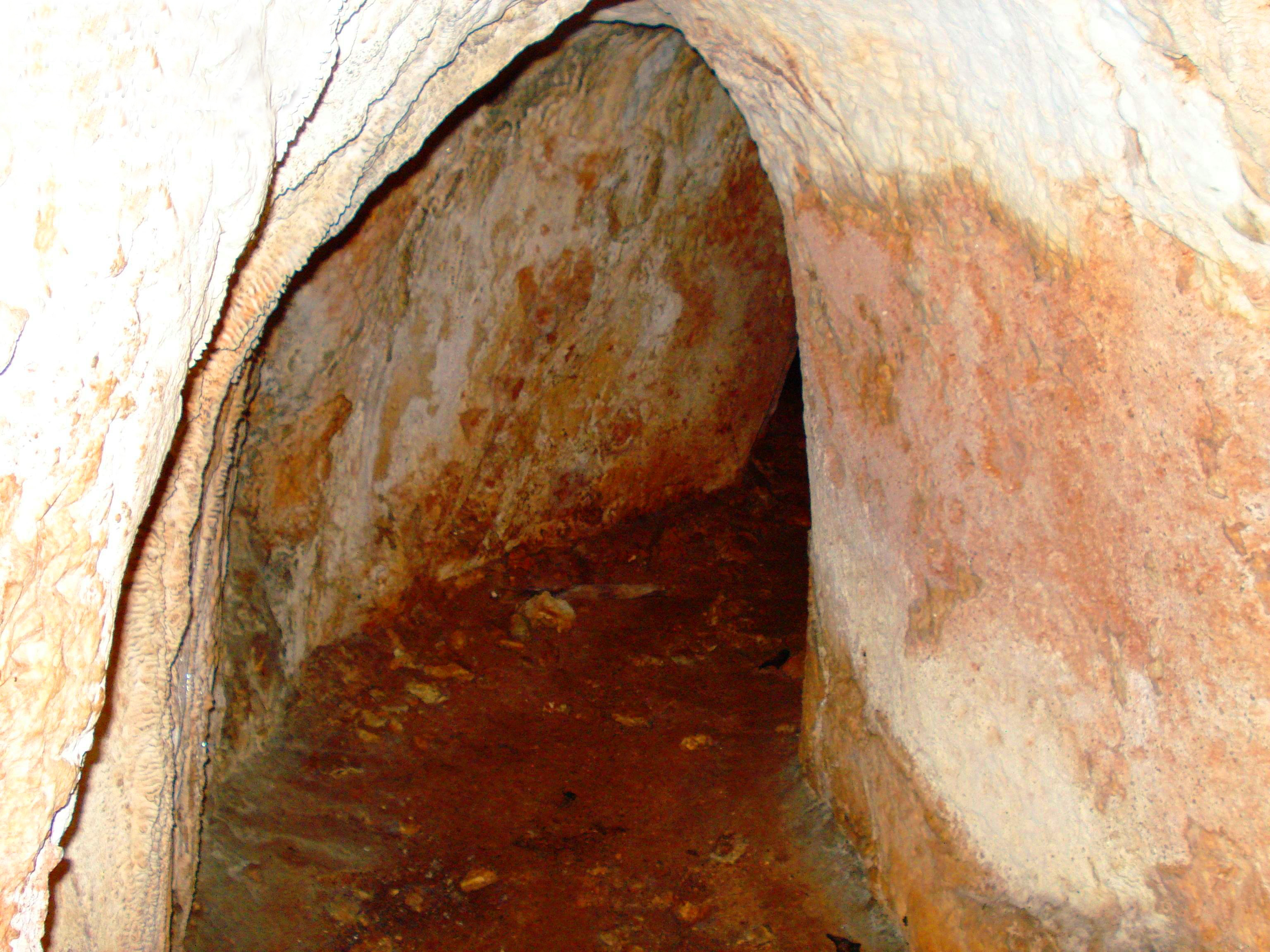
Roman Aqueduct Tunnel of Nicopolis

- the nympheum or great fountain.
- the baths (thermae)
- the Roman villa of Antoninus with beautiful mosaic
- the stadium, was the location of the famous Actian Games, together with the nearby gymnasium, theatre and hippodrome. It was located in the so-called 'Proasteion' (sacred grove) of Nicopolis. Dating from just after the city's foundation, the stadium has two semicircular ends (sphendones), typical of the Roman amphitheatre type. The stadiums of ancient Laodicea (near Pamukkale, Turkey) and Aphrodisias (Geyre, Turkey) have a similar architecture. The north side of the stadium, which must have held a capacity of at least 10,000 spectators, was built on the side of a hill, while artificial deposits were used for the other sides. The walls were made of a rubble core faced with several courses of bricks. On the west side of the stadium were three apsidal entrances leading to the gymnasium, the central one larger than the others. The entrances in the sphendone at the east led to the theatre nearby. On the sphendone at the south side there were residential rooms and facilities for athletes and spectators (inns, shops, lodgings etc.)

The nearby Archaeological Museum of Nikopolis contains many exhibits.

== See also ==
- List of cities in ancient Epirus
- List of traditional Greek place names
- Early centers of Christianity#Greece
- Athena Demegorusa, statue from Nicopolis
