= Metapa =

Metapa may refer to:

- Metapa (Greece), an ancient town of Greece
- Metapa, Chiapas, Mexico
- Metapa, former name of Ciudad Darío, in Matagalpa department, Nicaragua
