= Pamphia =

Coordinates: 38°30′39″N 21°39′39″E

Pamphia (Ancient Greek: Παμφία) was a village of ancient Aetolia, on the road from Metapa to Thermum, and distant 30 stadia from each. It was burnt by Philip V of Macedon in 218 BCE.

Its site is located near the modern Sitaralona.
