= Athena Demegorusa =

Roman statue of Athena

- Ἀθηνᾶ Δημηγοροῦσα (Greek)
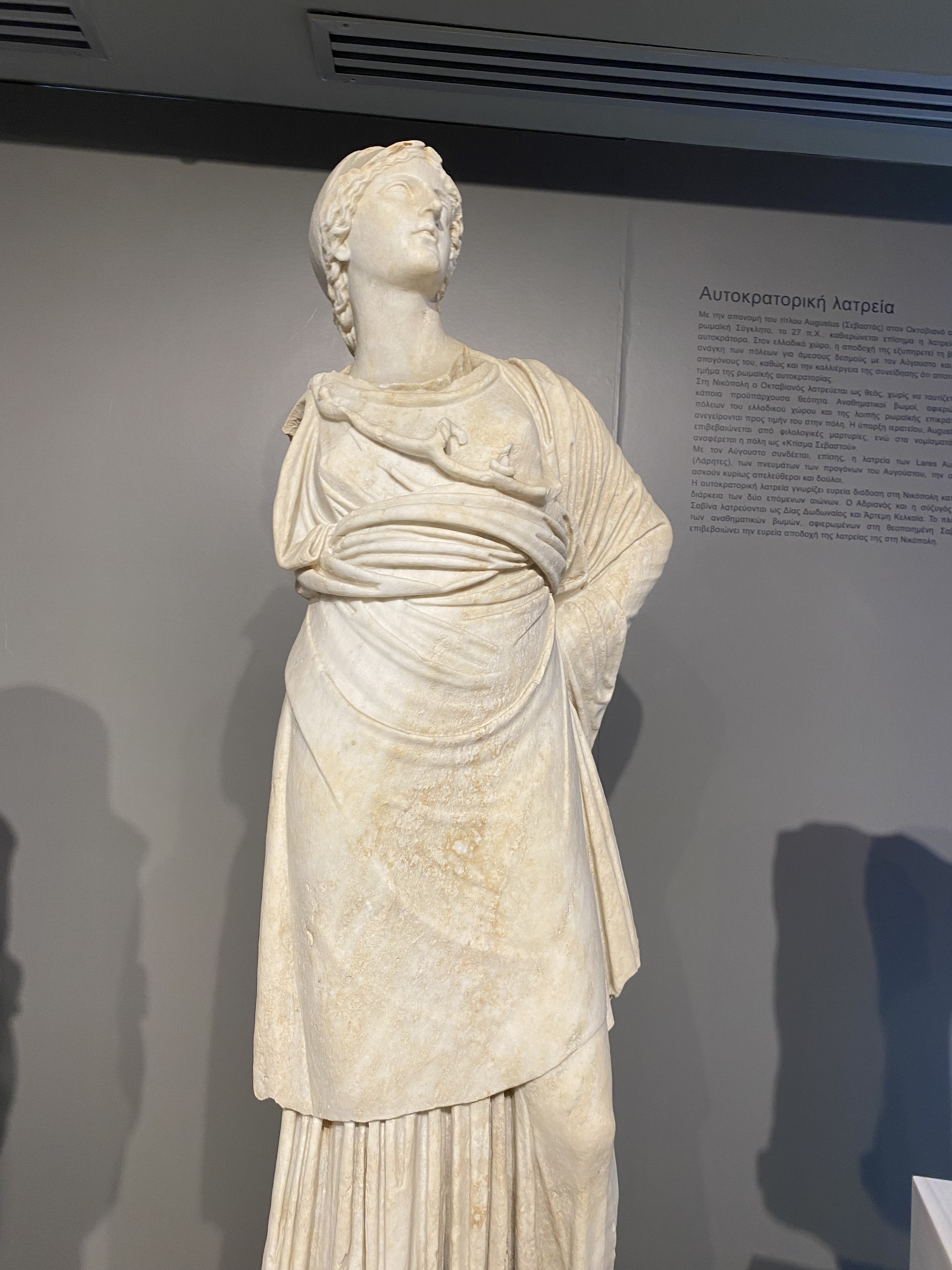
- The statue in the AMN
- Year: 2nd century AD
- Catalogue: No 6
- Medium: White marble
- Movement: Roman
- Subject: The goddess Athena/Minerva
- Dimensions: 153 cm × 57 cm (60 in × 22 in)
- Condition: Nearly intact; right arm missing
- Location: Archaeological Museum of Nicopolis, Preveza
- Owner: Greece
- Website: https://nicopolismuseum.gr/product/athena_statue/

The statue of Athena Demegorusa (Ancient Greek: Ἀθηνᾶ Δημηγοροῦσα, lit. 'Athena Speaking in Public') is a Roman marble lifesize sculpture of Athena, the Greek goddess of war and wisdom (also known among the Romans as Minerva). It was found in the Roman Forum of the ancient city of Nicopolis in the region of Epirus, and now exhibited in the Archaeological Museum of Nicopolis near Preveza, in western Greece.

== History ==
The statue is usually dated to around the time of Emperor Trajan (r. 98–117), though according to others it is from the times of Trajan's successor Emperor Hadrian (r. 117–138) instead, or the early period of the Antonines.

The statue was found in 1960 in the I. Nova plot, where the Roman Forum of Nicopolis was located, in a short distance from the conservatory. The discovery of the statue further attests to the worship of the goddess Athena in Nicopolis, as do other Athena-related archaeological finds from Nicopolis.

Today the statue of Athena Demegorusa is displayed in Room A of the Archaeological Museum of Nicopolis with inventory number 6, in the section dedicated to the Roman era of the city.

== Description ==
The statue is made of white marble, and at 153 cm high it is lifesize.

The goddess is depicted frontal and resting her weight on her right leg (a posture known as contrapposto), while her left leg is relaxed and bent backwards. Athena's left hand rests on her waist, while her head is turned to the left and up. Athena's helmet is of the Corinthian type, and she is wearing a veil and short chiton. Both her head and her now missing right arm were separate pieces and inserted into the main piece afterwards. Between her breasts lies her aegis, decorated with snakes, crossing her chest diagonally.

Her face is oval, thin and ends in a small round chin, which is slightly projected. Her forehead is smooth with broad cheeks, almond-shaped eyes with a wide upper eyelids, while the goddess's straight eyebrows bend slightly towards her temples. Athena's mouth is small, with thin lips that are half-opened; the edges of the oral slit indicate use of a drill.

The Athena Demegorusa belongs to the statuary type known as Vescavali-Arezzo, and is a copy of a fourth-century BC Greek original. That original might had been a work by Praxiteles.

== See also ==
- Piraeus Athena
- Mourning Athena
- Varvakeion Athena
- Terpsichore statuette from Dodona
