= Mourning Athena =

Relief of Athena in Athens, Greece

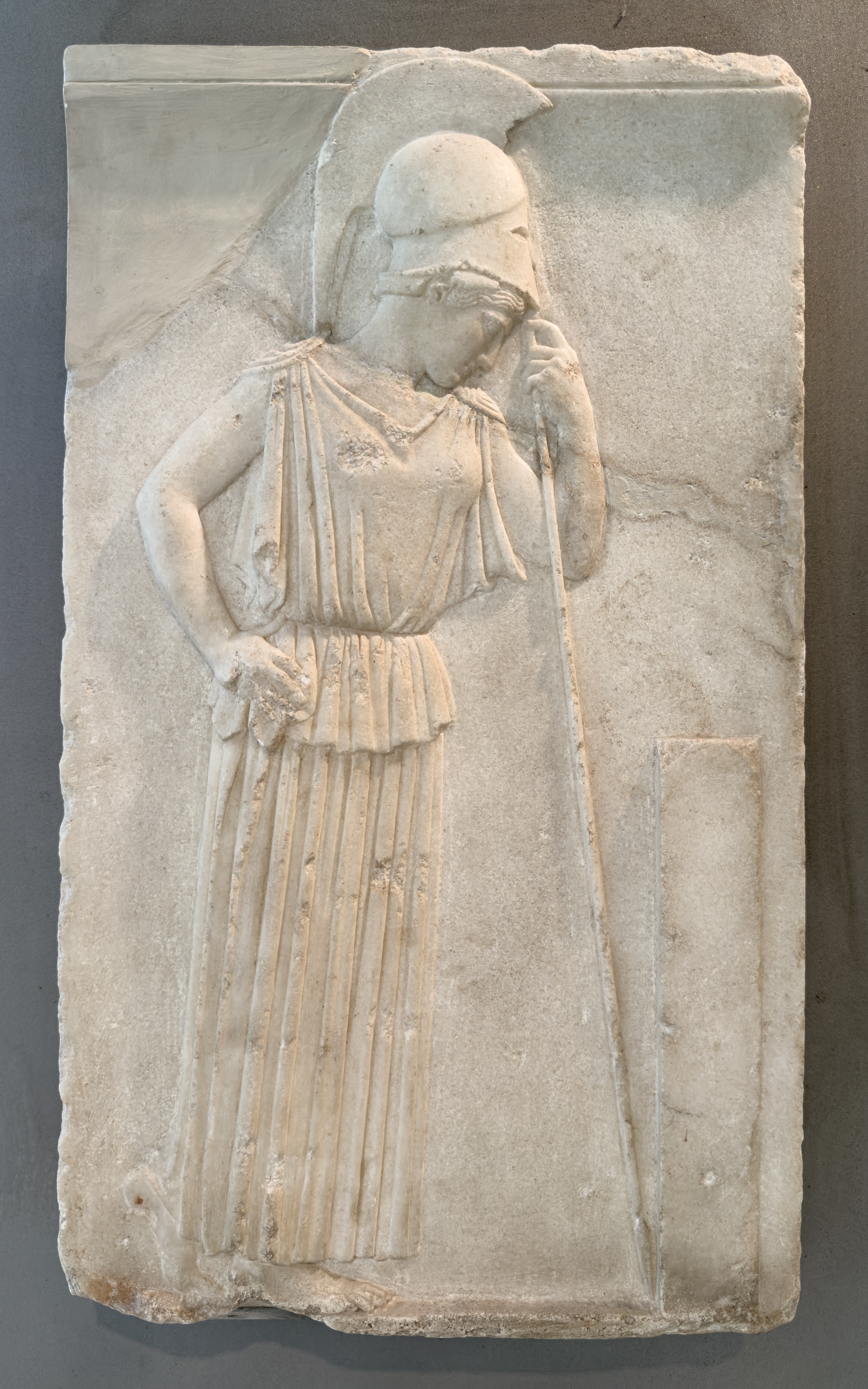
The Mourning Athena

The so-called Mourning Athena (or Greek: Σκεπτομένη Αθηνά "Pensive Athena") is an Athenian marble relief dated circa 460 BC which depicts Athena, the Greek goddess of wisdom and warfare and patron-deity of the city of Athens. The relief is 0.48 m high and made of Parian marble. Today it is displayed at the Acropolis Museum in Athens, with inventory no. 695.

== Description ==
The goddess, Athena, marked by her helmet of the Corinthian type, wears a peplos, clasped at the shoulders and cinched at the waist. She rests her right hand on her hip and crosses her left leg over her right. Her left hand grasps a spear on which she leans, and her head is inclined.

The meaning of her bowed head has been a matter of debate since the relief's excavation from the Acropolis of Athens in 1888. As the conventional name suggests, many have taken the posture to indicate sadness or pensiveness, and thus to interpret the rectangular object on the viewer's right as a stele, a stone slab that serves as a grave marker. Others see an 'exhausted Athena', and others still see no such emotion. The exact nature of the rectangular object, too, is unclear – some suggest that an object was perched atop it (e.g., the infant Erichthonius) – others that it is a marker from a race-course.

== See also ==
- Piraeus Athena
- Lemnian Athena
- Athena Demegorusa
- Athena of Velletri
