= Terpsichore statuette from Dodona =

Statuette of a Greek Muse

Statuette of Terpsichore
- Τερψιχόρη της Δωδώνης (Greek)
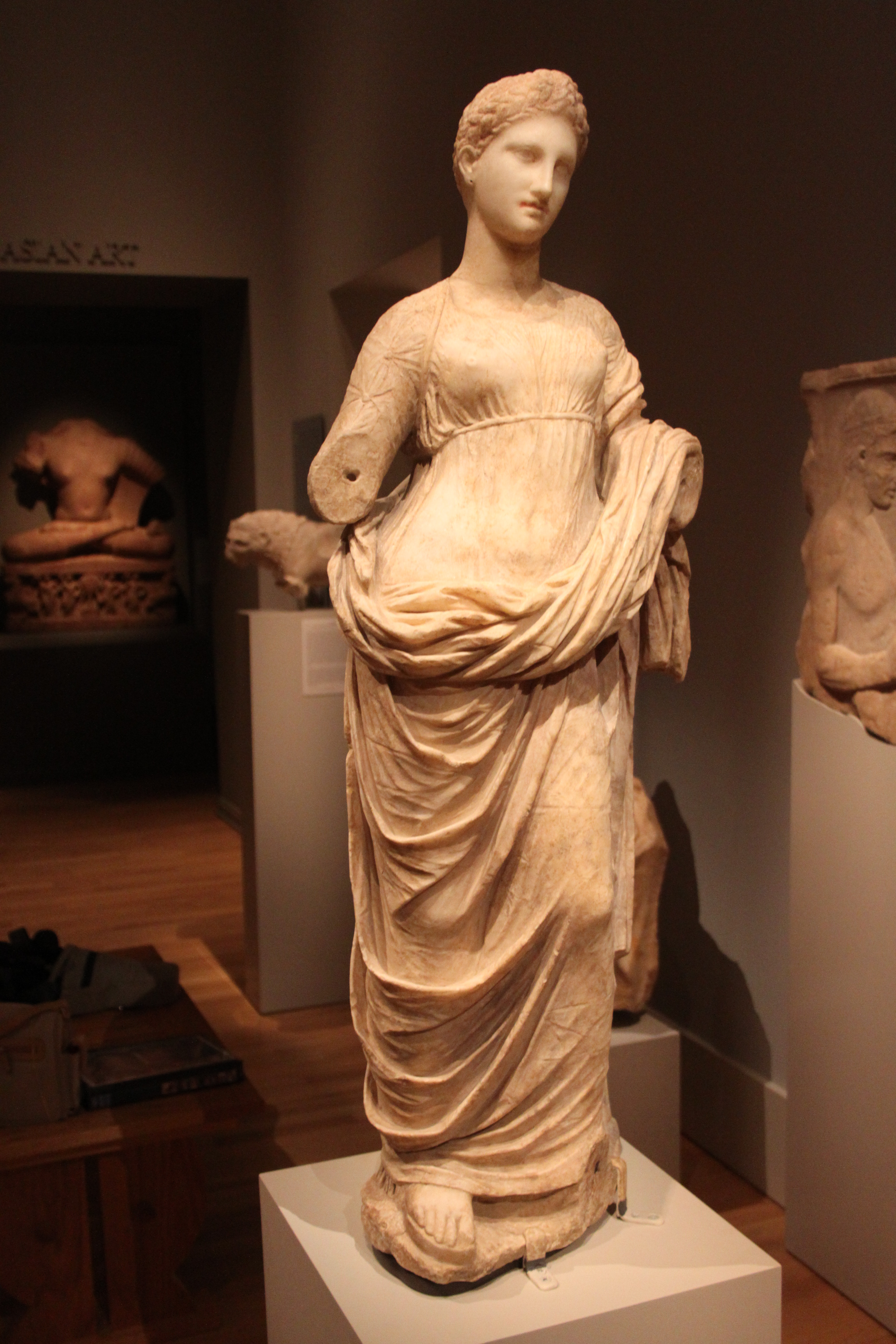
- The statue when exhibited in the Carlos Museum
- Year: 2nd century BC
- Medium: White marble
- Movement: Hellenistic
- Subject: The goddess Terpsichore
- Dimensions: 99.1 cm × 29.2 cm (39.0 in × 11.5 in)
- Condition: Forearms and left foot missing
- Location: Michael C. Carlos Museum (formerly) Fethiye Mosque, Athens (formerly)
- Owner: Greece

The Terpsichore from Dodona (Greek: Τερψιχόρη της Δωδώνης) is an ancient Greek marble statue under lifesize depicting Terpsichore, the Greek goddess of dance, created around the second century BC. The Hellenistic work of art was discovered in Epirus in northwestern Greece and illegally smuggled out of the country in the late nineties. It then became a prized piece of the Ancient Greek and Roman collection of the Michael C. Carlos Museum in Atlanta, Georgia, until it was finally repatriated to Greece in early 2024, after more than sixteen years of negotiations and legal disputes.

At first the sculpture was exhibited in the capital Athens that same year and then in Patras the next for a limited time before it was eventually returned to its native Epirus to be displayed there.

== History ==
=== Excavation and smuggling ===
The statuette was discovered at the site of ancient Dodona (outside Ioannina) in the Greek region of Epirus during illicit excavations in the year 1997; the Greek Ministry of Culture and Sports was alerted by a local man a couple of years later, but they were slow to act as the statuette was erroneously deemed a worthless forgery. News of the statuette's alleged false origins were spread in the black market, with the result that its price and perceived worth plummeted quickly.

Nevertheless, the Terpsichore statuette was acquired by the Michael C. Carlos Museum in Atlanta, United States, in 2002, alongside some other artifacts of dubious provenance and legality. The museum purchased it from a New York-based dealer named Robert Hecht, who claimed at the time that he and his partner George Zakos had owned it legally since 1974; the Carlos is among the several American museums criticised for displaying looted art. Throughout its history of acquiring its antique collection the museum has come under fire several times for "turn[ing] a blind eye" to the doubtful provenance of a number of its acquisitions and failing to exercise the appropriate diligence in favour of speedily enlarging its classical-art collection—considered to be the most prominent one in the southeast US.

=== Negotiations and repatriation ===
Official attempts from the Greek state for the repatriation of the Terpsichore started in 2007, when concerns were raised in Greek press over the manner of the acquisition of the statue and two more objects, a Minoan larnax and a large Rhodian pithos, although until 2020 the informal contacts between the two sides were without any substantial progress. In the early stages, the Carlos Museum showed little urgency to settle the matter. In 2021, the talks were restarted anew. Photographic evidence was used to support the Greek case. The Greek Ministry was criticised over how slow it had been to act.

In April 2022, the file with all the documentation and evidence was submitted to the Greek Embassy in Washington and, with the mediation of the Consul of Greece in Atlanta, a new round of contacts between the representatives began. Finally, in June 2023, the Carlos Museum notified the Ministry of Foreign Affairs of its intention to return the Terpsichore along with two more objects to Greece. The three artifacts were handed to the Greek Minister of Culture and Sports, Dr Lina Mendoni, in late January 2024, after sixteen years of negotiations. Mendoni said that the artifacts would be exhibited in Athens for some time before being returned to their respective regions; the statuette was kept on display at the Fethiye Mosque in the Roman agora of the city until 31 May 2024. On January 12 2025 it was briefly exhibited in the Archaeological Museum of Patras.

The two other items returned are a fourteenth century BC Minoan clay larnax with fish decorations from Crete and a marble fragment of a seated man from an Attic funerary naiskos (tomb relief decoration) of the late fourth century BC.

== Description ==
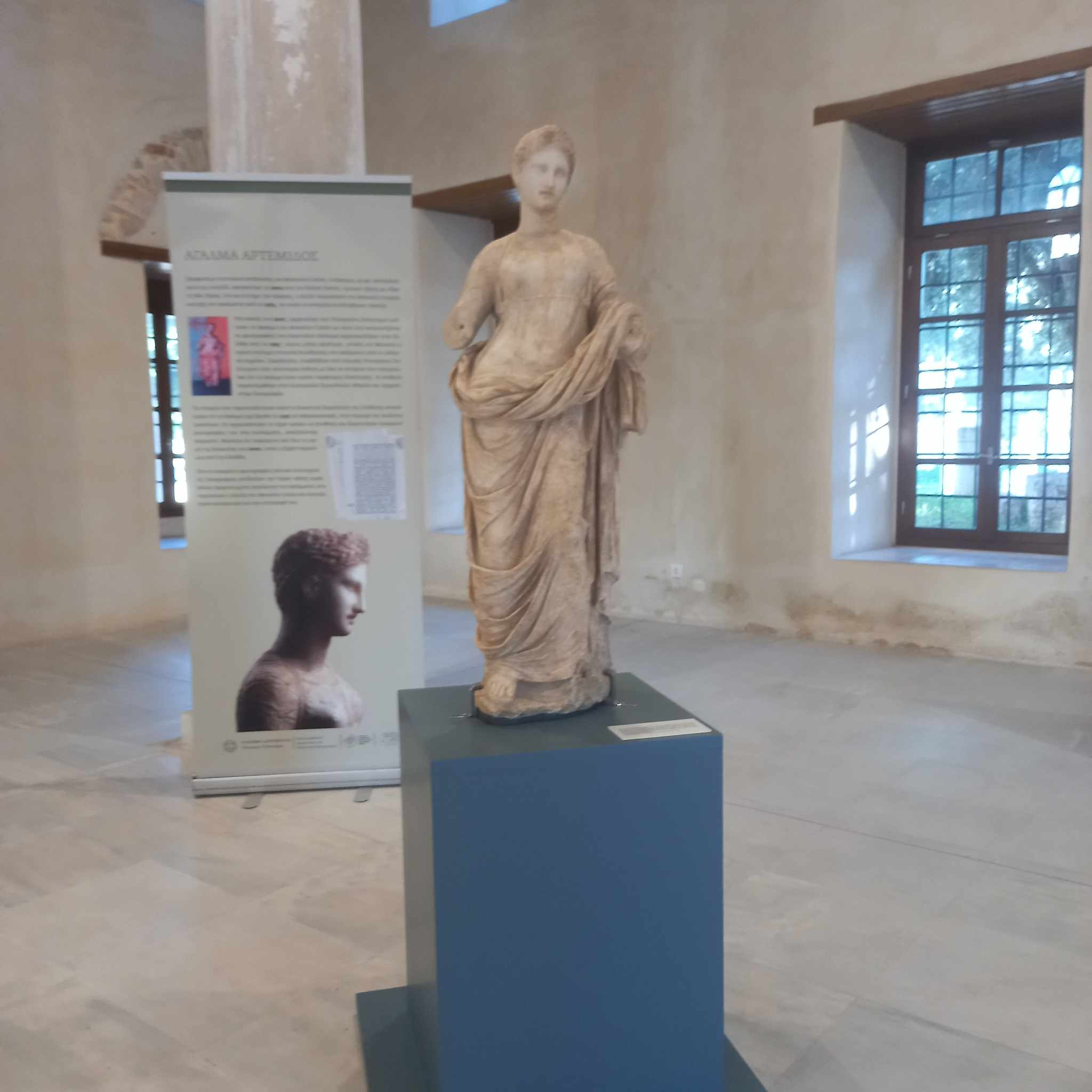
The statuette during its temporal exhibition in the Fethiye Mosque.

The marble statuette, which is smaller than lifesize, depicts a young female figure identified as the goddess Terpsichore resting her weight with her left elbow on a tall tree trunk, and is dated back to the second century BC during the Hellenistic period. It is made from white marble; the head from Parian marble, the body from Pentelic, and measures 99.1 cm in height and 29.2 cm in width.

The goddess stands in contrapposto, her right leg supporting her weight, while she leans on a tree stump with her left elbow; the holes on the tree trunk were probably used for the attachment of a separate piece with an attribute of the goddess, like a kithara. She is wearing a thin, long chiton, which is pinned at her shoulders on both arms. The chiton is held at place with a cord that passes beneath Terpsichore's breasts, then under her shoulders and finally crosses at the back.

On top of the chiton she wears a himation (a type of cloak), wrapped low around her hips and legs. The folds the himation creates as it hangs from her left arm conceals part of the stump. Terpsichore's hair is braided into a coronet that circles her head, and her ears are also pierced so earrings could be attached. Her lips, eyes and hair still bear faint traces of pigment.

Prior to its return to Greece, the statuette had been described as "one of the finest examples of Hellenistic sculpture in the United States".

== See also ==
- Athena Demegorusa, statue of Athena from Epirus
- Las Incantadas, group of sculptures taken from Thessalonica
- Caryatids of Eleusis, sculpture taken from Eleusis
- Elgin Marbles, Parthenon sculptures taken from the Acropolis of Athens

== Bibliography ==
- Gaunt, Jasper (February 2005). "New Galleries of Greek & Roman Art at Emory University: The Michael C. Carlos Museum". Minerva. 16. USA.
- Gill, David W. J. (October 1, 2024). Artwashing the Past: Context Matters. Maryland, US: Rowman & Littlefield. ISBN 9798881803278.
