= Archaeological Museum of Nicopolis =

Archaeological museum in Preveza, Greece

- Αρχαιολογικό Μουσείο Νικόπολης
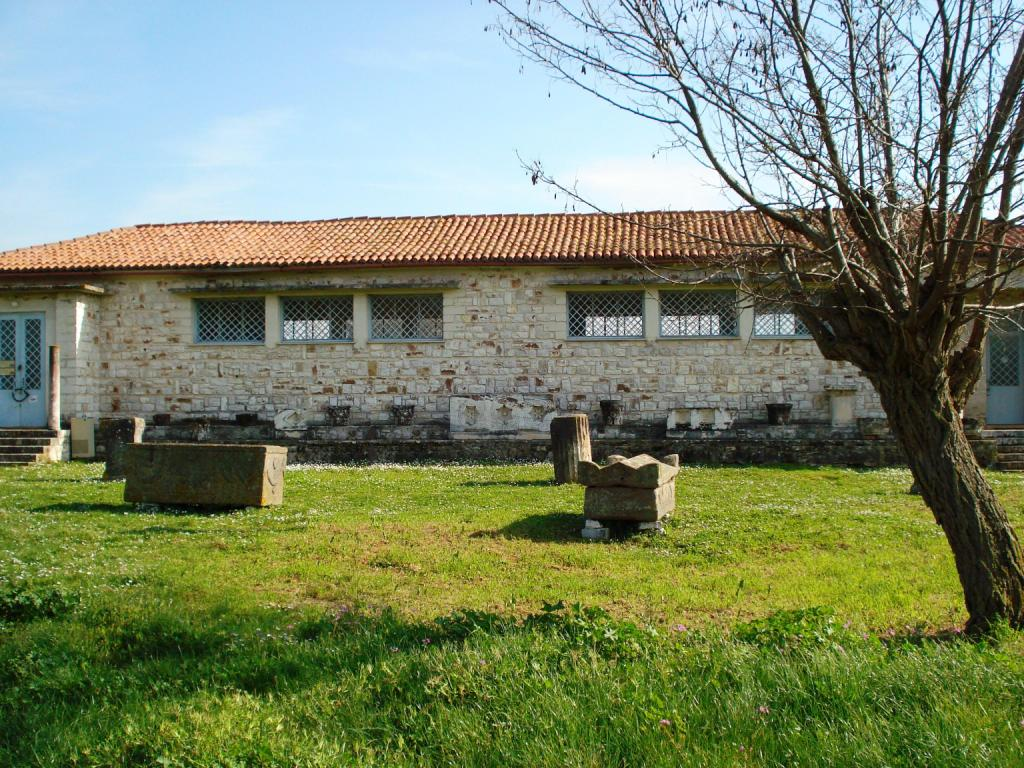
- The Old Archaeological Museum
- Interactive fullscreen map
- Established: 2009 (third and current one)
- Location: Preveza
- Coordinates: 39°00′29″N 20°44′07″E
- Type: Archaeological Museum
- Collection size: More than 10,000 objects (1100 in display)
- Owner: Hellenic Ministry of Culture and Tourism
- Website: https://nicopolismuseum.gr

The Archaeological Museum of Nicopolis is a museum in Nicopolis, in the Preveza regional unit in northwestern Greece.

== History ==
Until 1940, the "Archaeological Museum of Preveza – Nicopolis" was located in an Ottoman mosque, in the city of Preveza, Greece. In 1940, the mosque was bombed by Italian aircraft and wa partially destroyed. Some of the exhibits were stolen. After the Second World War, the mosque was demolished by the Greek state. In 1965 the state built a small Archaeological Museum inside the Byzantine walls of ancient Nicopolis: 39°0′29″N 20°44′7″E. From 1998 to 2006 a new archaeological museum was built 5 km North of Preveza. In July 2009, the new Archaeological museum of Nicopolis was opened to the public. The Nicopolis Museum is open every day from 8 am to 8pm, including Saturday and Sunday (more information on the official website).

== Exhibits ==
- Marble tomb sculpture, with the name of the deceased, his father, his profession, his age.
- Marble oblation altar, dedicated to Empress Sabine, wife of Emperor Hadrian.
- Marble sarcophagus, with lions, flowers, etc.
- Marble sitting lion of the 4th century BC
- Marble statue of goddess Minerva - a Roman copy of 4th century BC
- Marble statue of a muse called the "small Heracliotis"
- Broken marble head of General Agrippa, reconstructed.
- Marble head of Faustina, wife of Emperor Marcus Aurelius, who appears to suffer from strabismus.
- Marble Cylindrical base of a statue, with a relief the Battle of the Amazons (Amazonomachia). It has been partially reused as a Christian mosaic, from the Alkysson Basilica.
- Marble plaque with an ancient symposium (a postcital man and a woman)
- Glass urn, coins, and hair pins from Odeum.
- New exhibits: Many important new exhibits are being prepared for the new museum, and will go on display in 2010. Many of them were found at the site of the Monument of Augustus between the years 1995–2005.

== Gallery ==
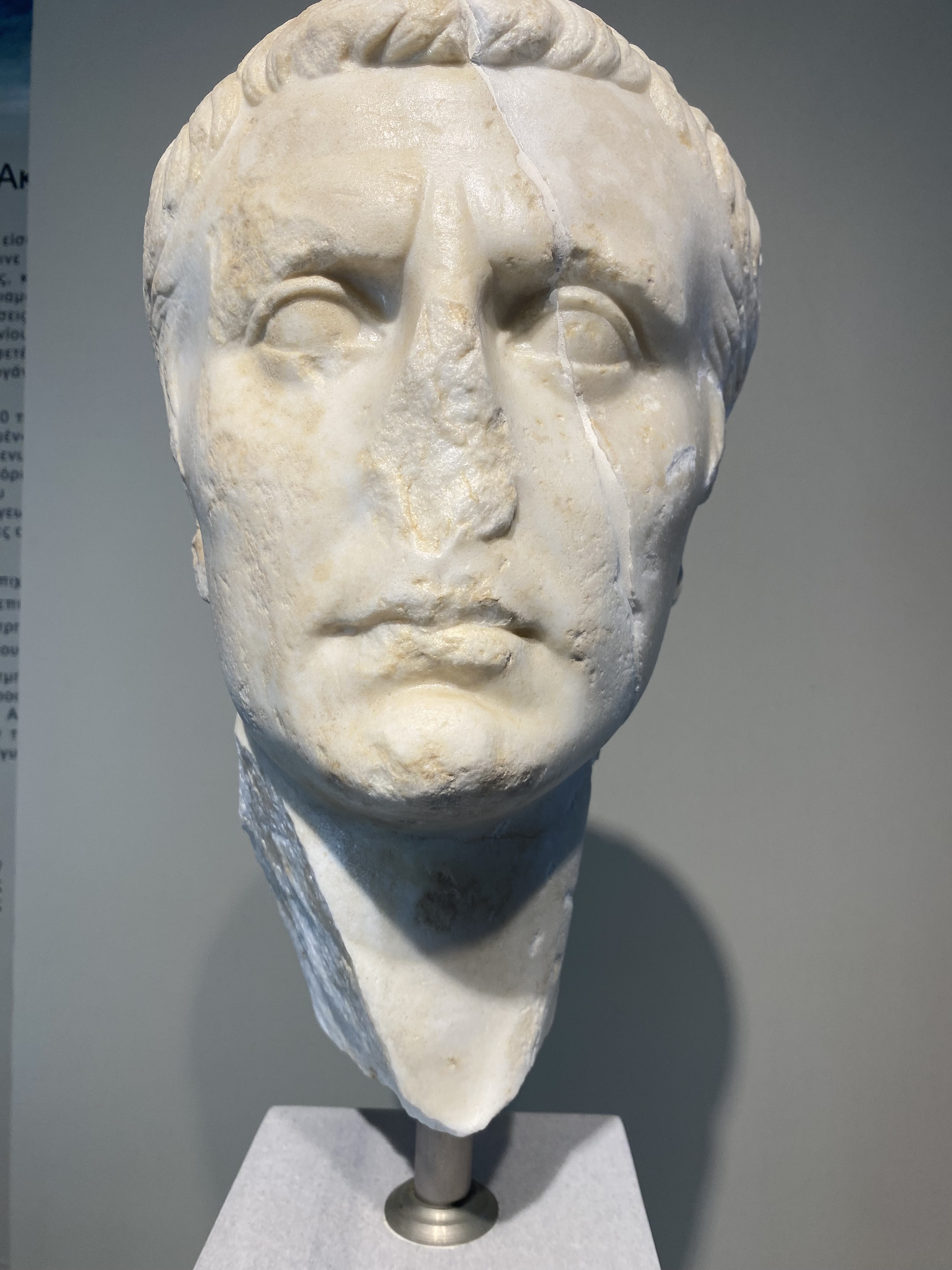
Marble bust of General Agrippa, dating from the second half of the 1st century BC.

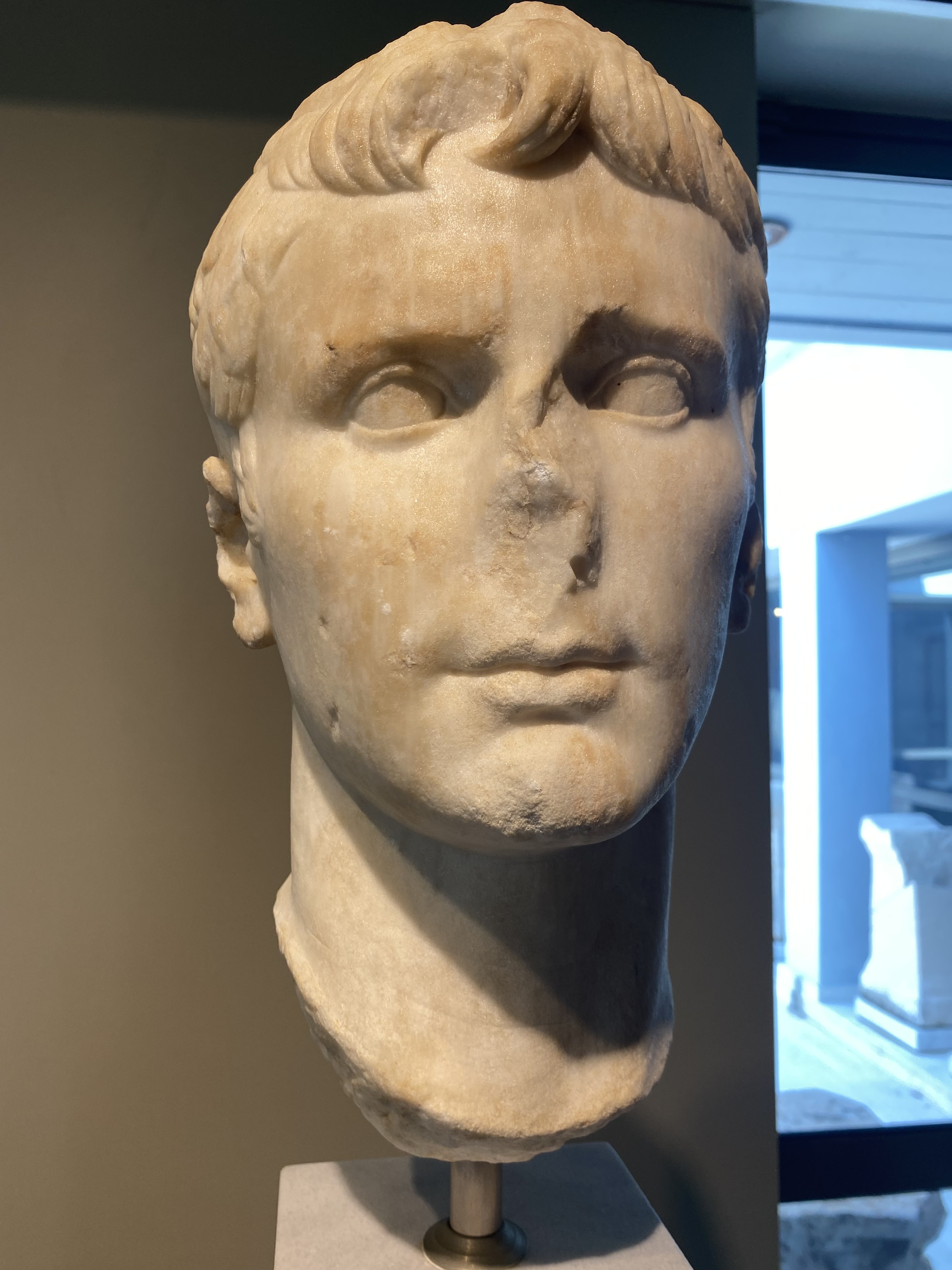
Marble bust of Augustus, dating from either the second half of the 1st century BC, or the 1st century AD.

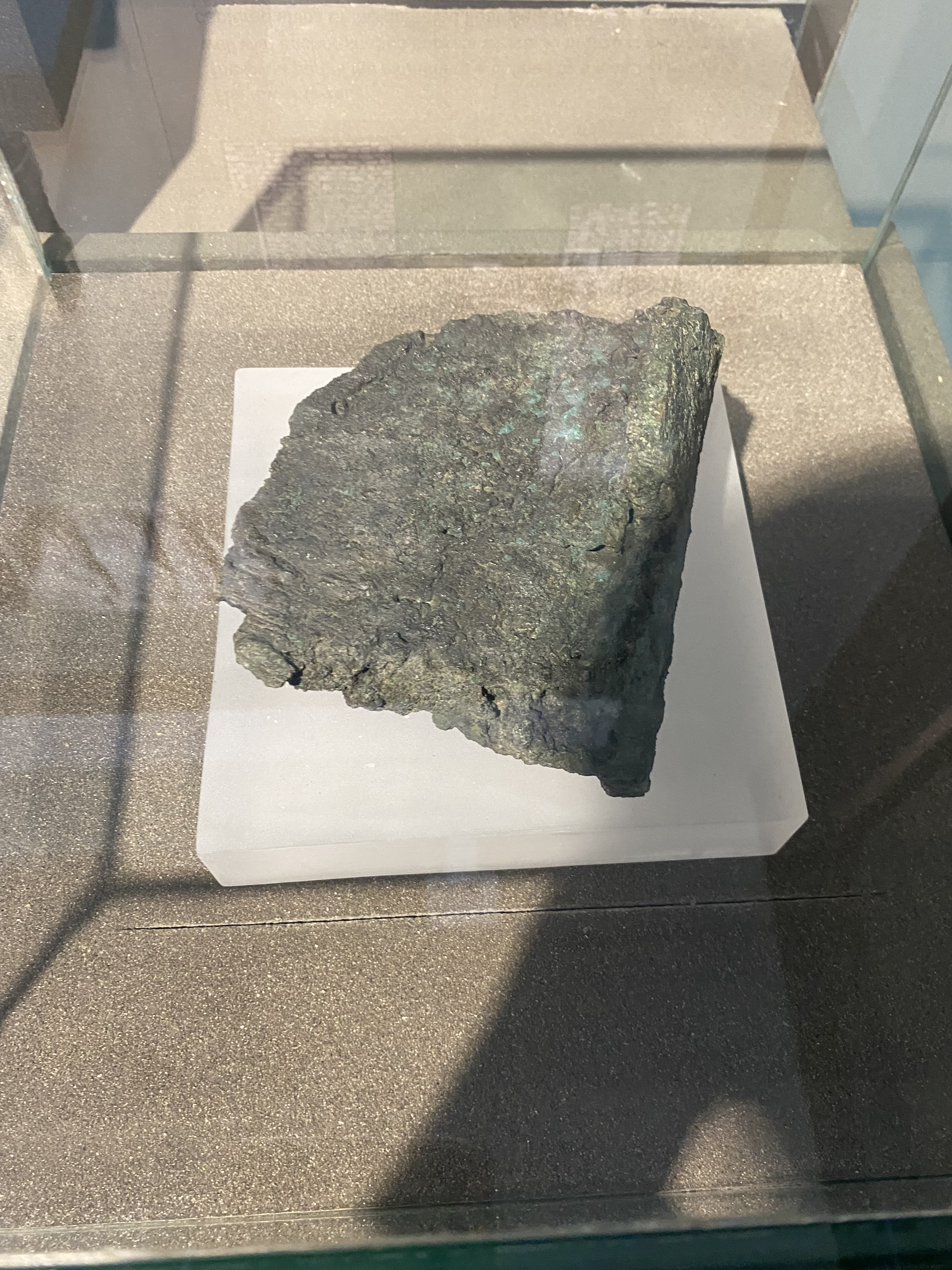
The last surviving bronze ship ram taken from the fleet of Marc Antony and Cleopatra, originally 36 ship rams would have been set up on display at the Monument of Augustus (the Victory Monument of Actium).

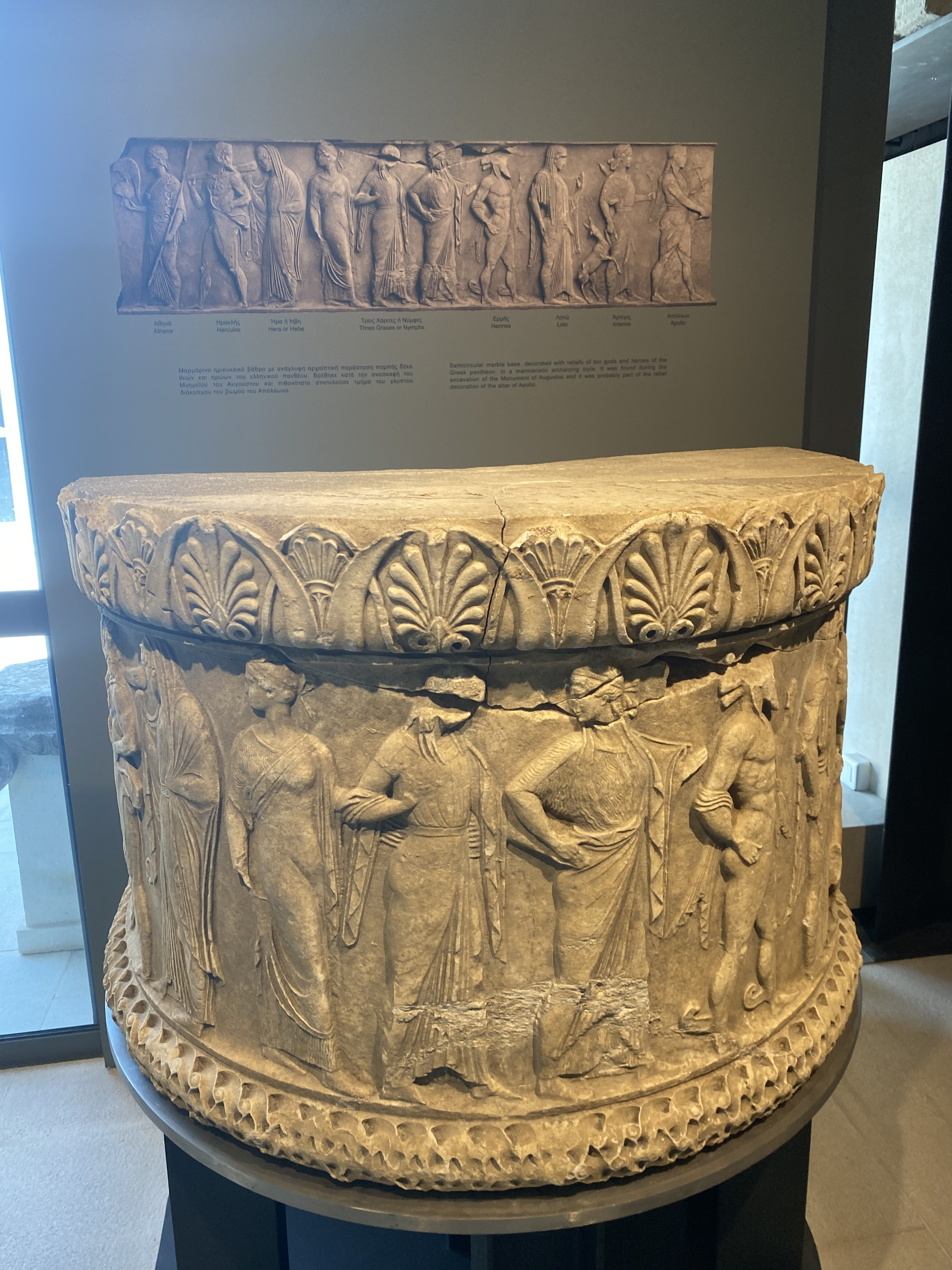
Semicircular marble base, likely a decorative aspect of the altar of Apollo at the Monument of Augustus. Depicted are various gods and heroes of the Greek Pantheon, note the archaistic style.

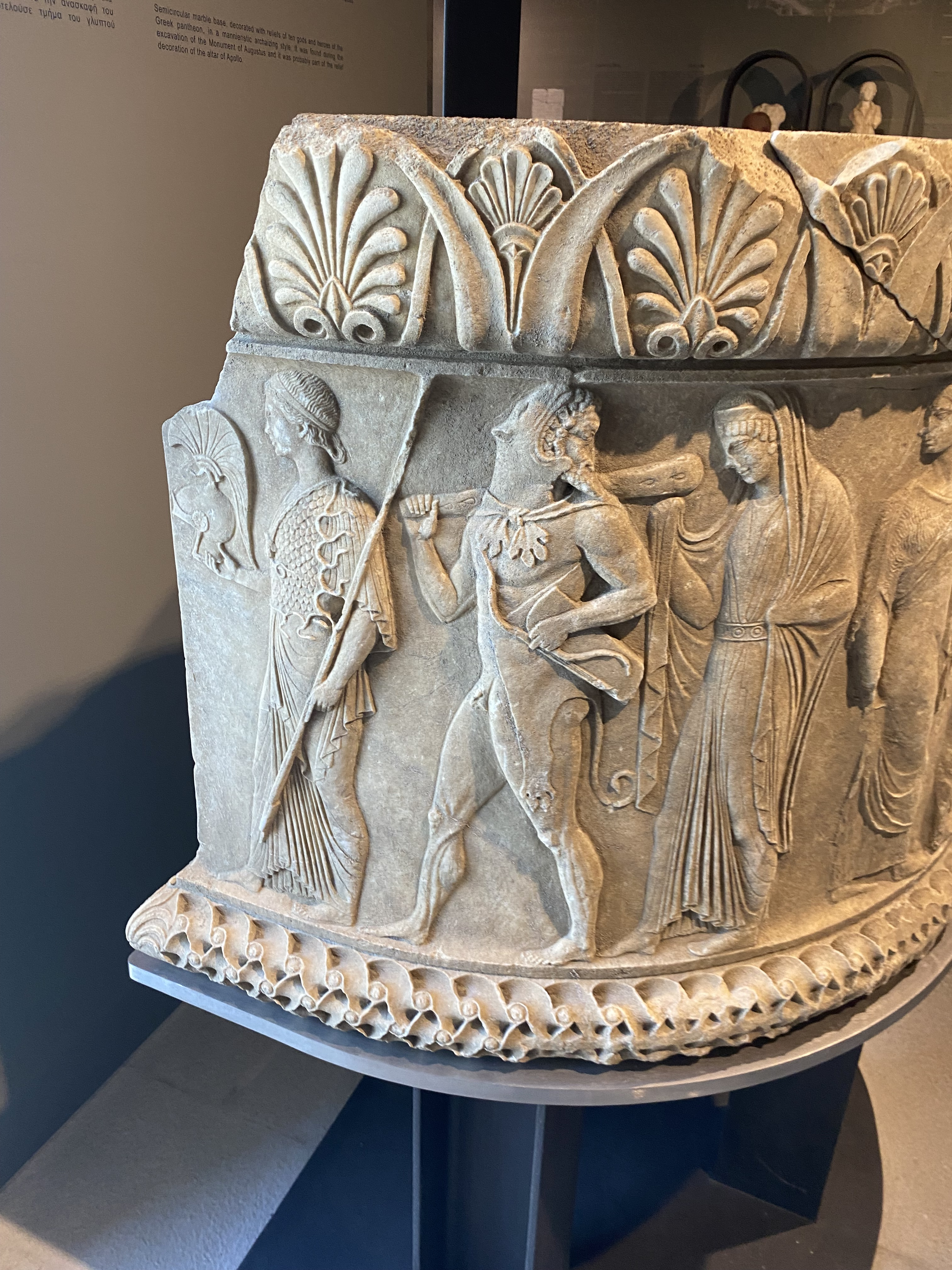
Detail of the semicircular marble base.

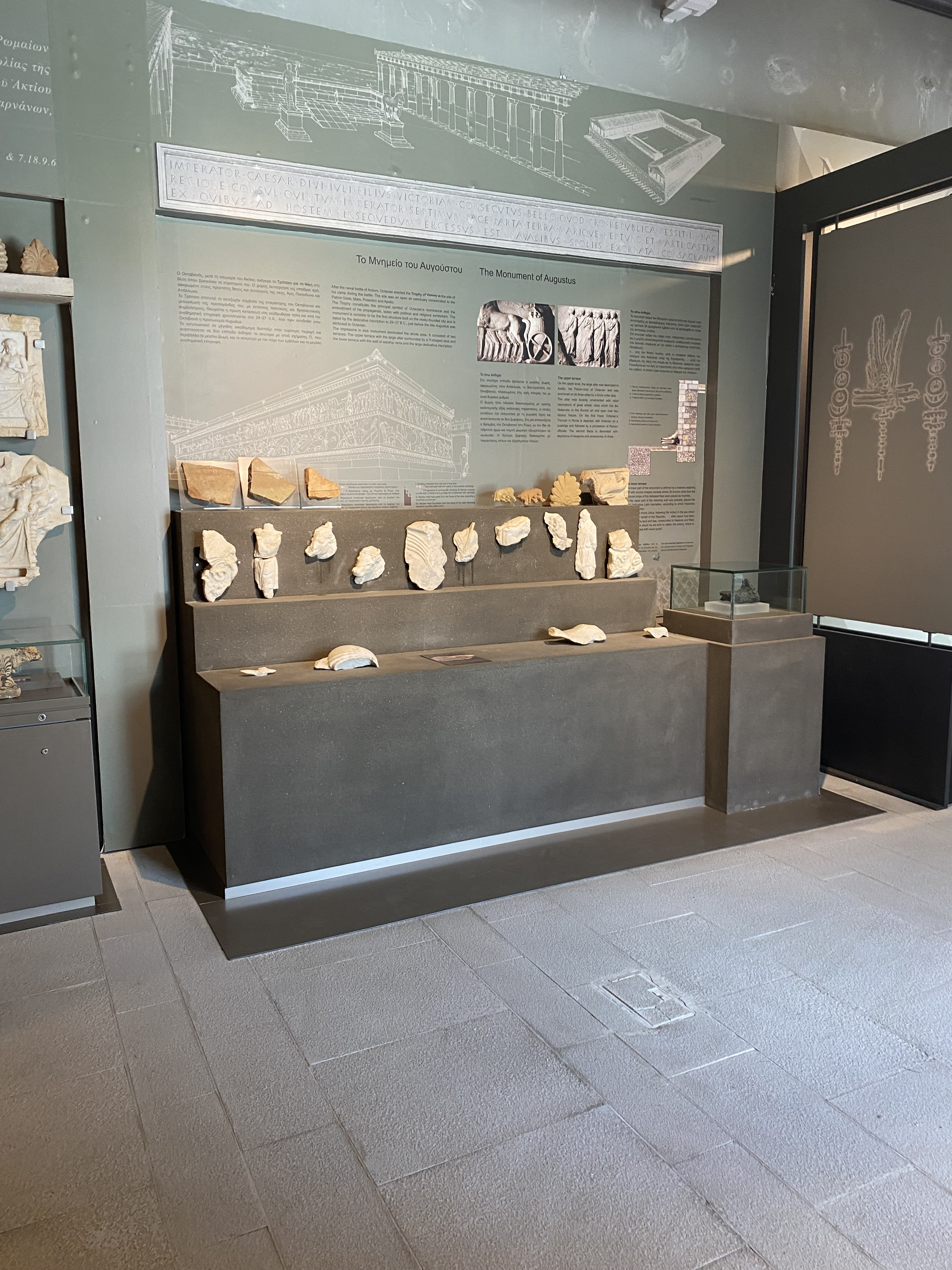
Decorative fragments from the Monument of Augustus.

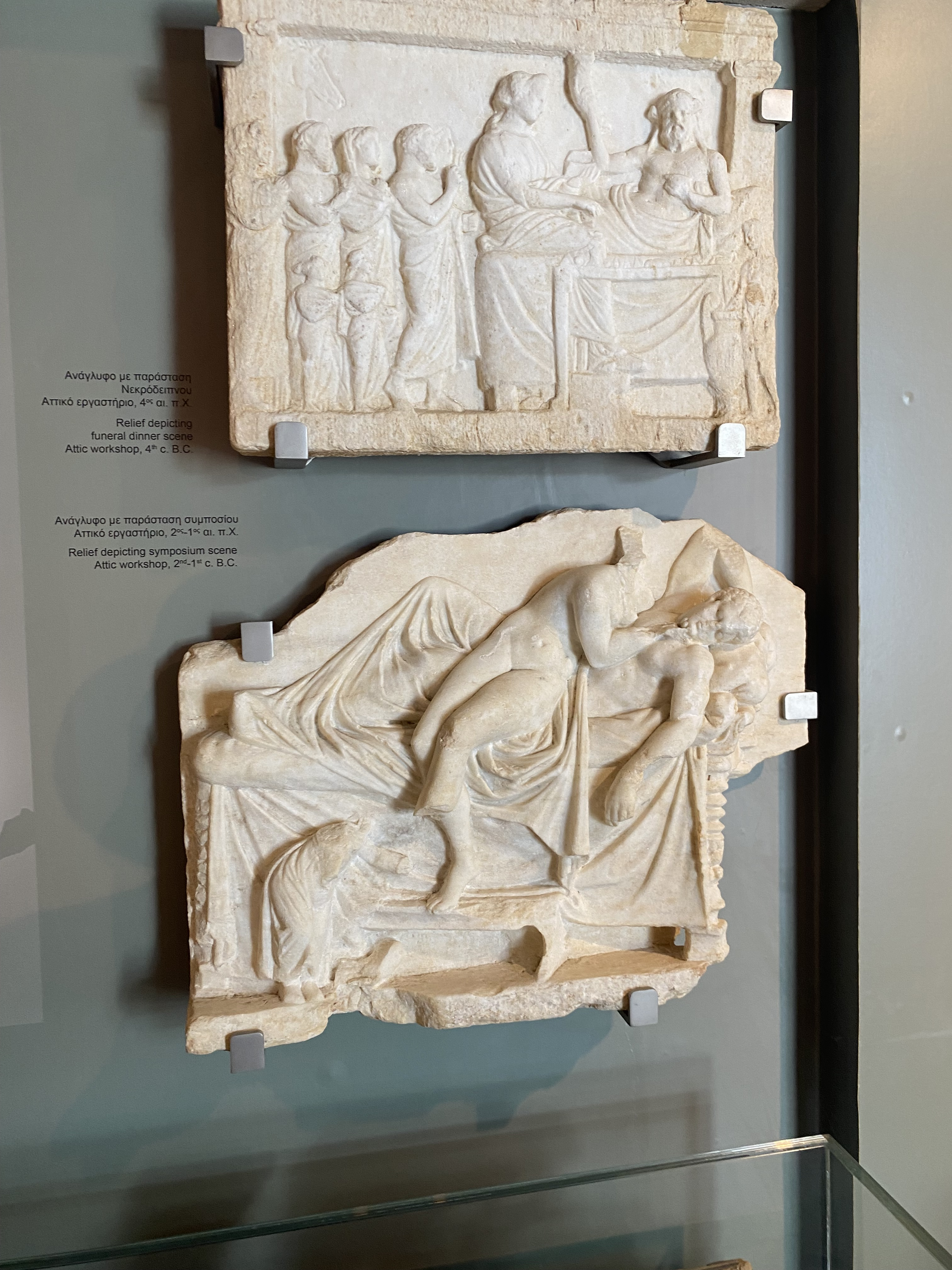
Two Attic reliefs, one is from the 4th century BC while the other is between the 2nd century BC to the 1st century BC.

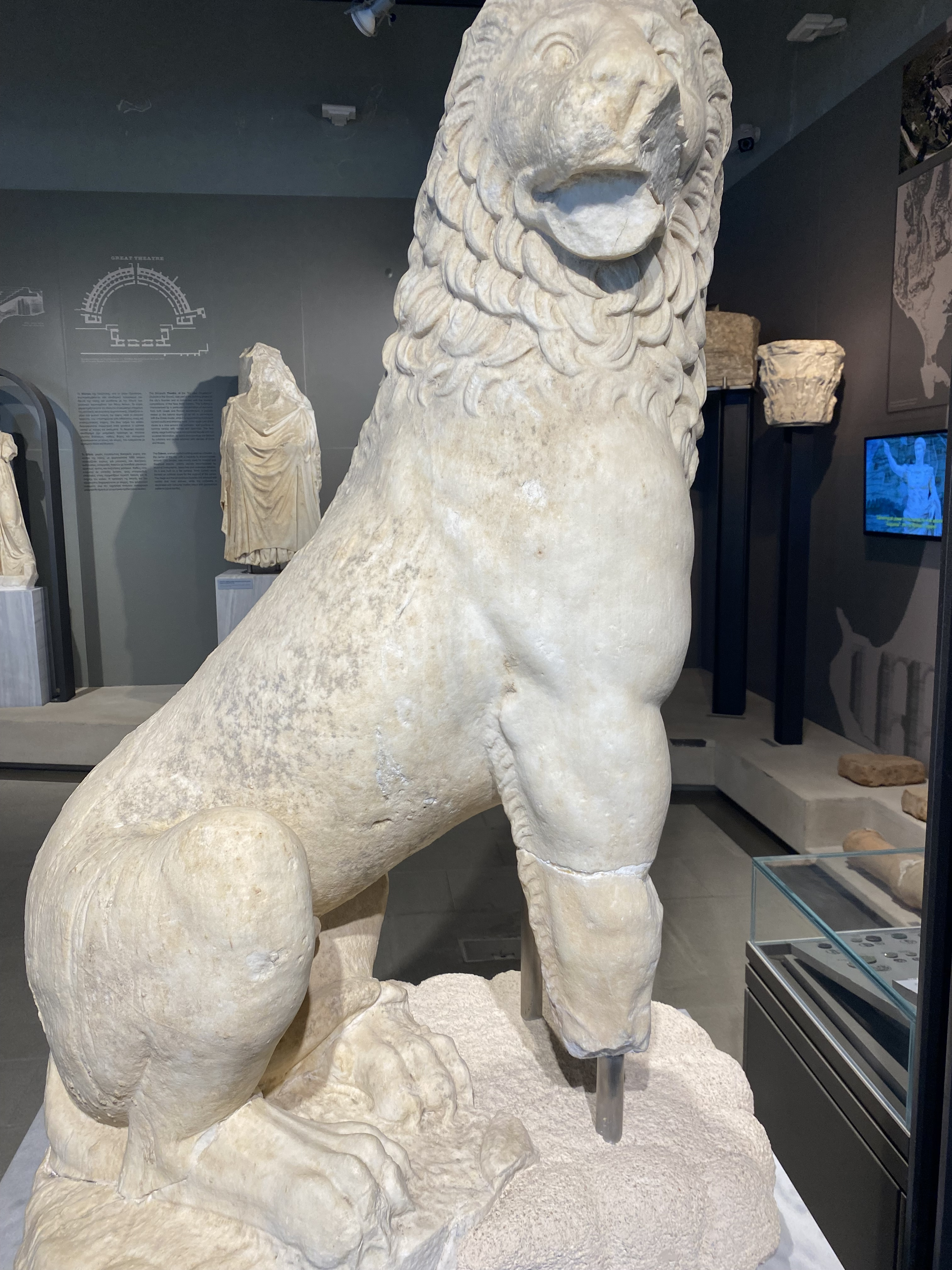
A Greek marble lion, from the 4th century BC.

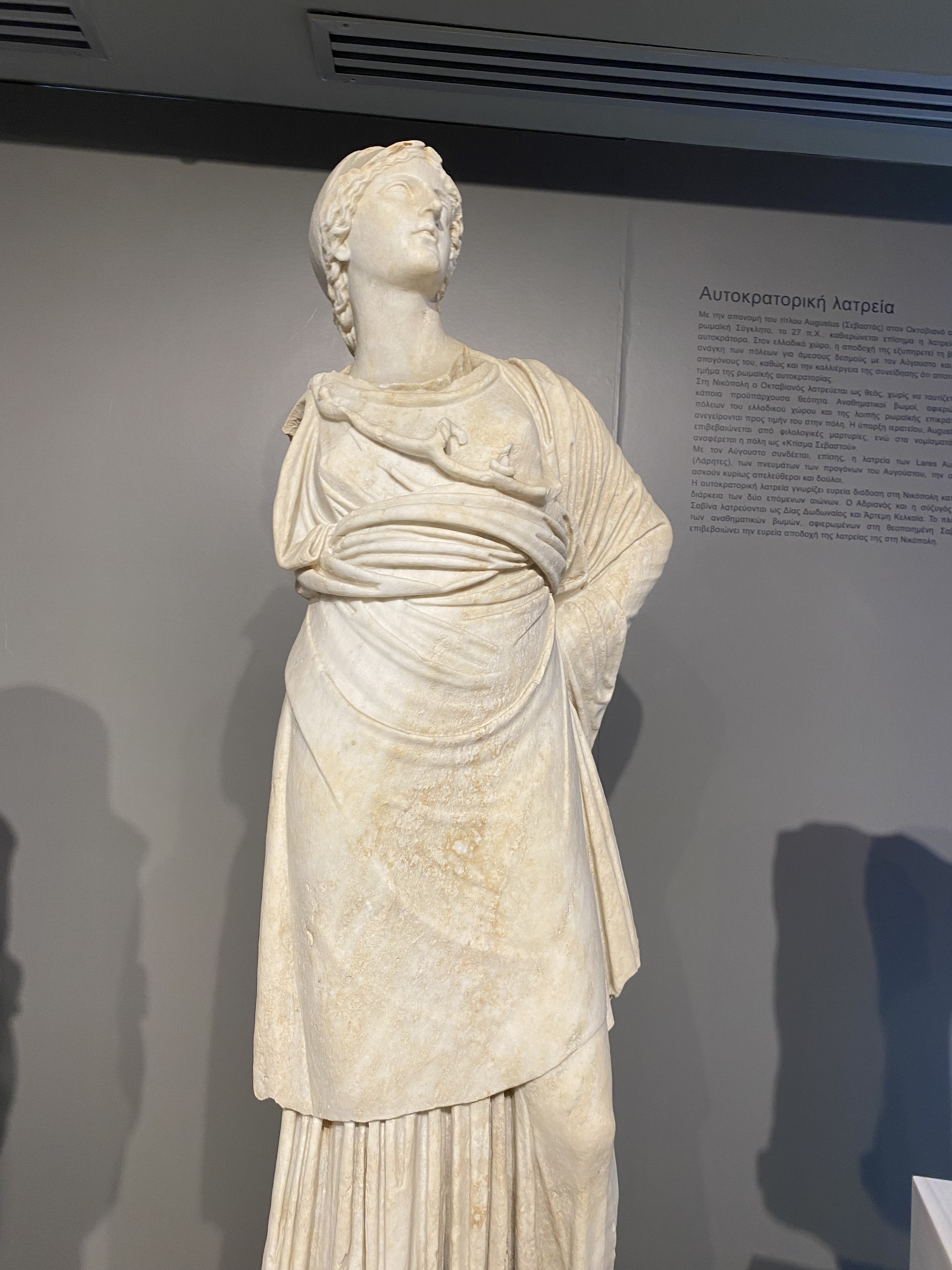
A Roman marble statue of Minerva/Athena Demegorusa.
