= Lysimachia (Aetolia) =

Coordinates: 38°32′48″N 21°20′18″E

Lysimachia (Ancient Greek: Λυσιμαχία) or Lysimacheia (Λυσιμάχεια) was a town of ancient Aetolia, situated upon the southern shore of the lake formerly called Hyria or Hydra, and subsequently Lake Lysimachia, after this town. The town was probably founded by Arsinoë, and named after her first husband Lysimachus, since we know that she enlarged the neighbouring town of Conope, and called it Arsinoë after herself. The position of the town is determined by the statement of Strabo that it lay between Pleuron and Conope, and by that of Livy, who places it on the line of march from Naupactus and Calydon to Stratus. It was deserted in Strabo's time.

Its site is tentatively located near the modern Mourstianou.
