= Conope =

Coordinates: 38°34′19″N 21°17′56″E

Conope or Konope (Ancient Greek: Κωνώπη) and later, Arsinoe (Ἀρσινόη) or Arsinoia (Ἀρσινοΐα), was a city of ancient Aetolia, in Greece, near the eastern bank of the Achelous River, and 20 stadia from the ford of this river (approximately 1.9 to 2.6 miles (3.1 to 4.2 km)). It was only a village until it was enlarged by Arsinoe, the wife and sister of Ptolemy Philadelphus. Polybius, in his history of the Social War (220-217 BCE), calls it Conope, although elsewhere he refers to it as Arsinoe or Arsinoia. It is mentioned by Cicero under the name of Arsinoe. Near this town the river Cyathus flowed into the Achelous from the lake Hyria, which is also called Conope by Antoninus Liberalis.

Its site is located near the modern village of Angelokastro (Angelókastro, Anghelokastro) in Aetolia-Acarnania, Greece.
