= Lysimachia (Mysia) =

Town

Coordinates: 38°59′50″N 26°50′01″E

Lysimachia or Lysimachea (Ancient Greek: Λυσιμαχία) or Lysimacheia (Λυσιμάχεια) was a small town in ancient Mysia, mentioned only by Pliny the Elder, in whose time it no longer existed.

Its site is tentatively located near the modern Hatıplar in İzmir Province, Turkey.
