= Lake Lysimachia =

- Λίμνη Λυσιμαχία (Greek)
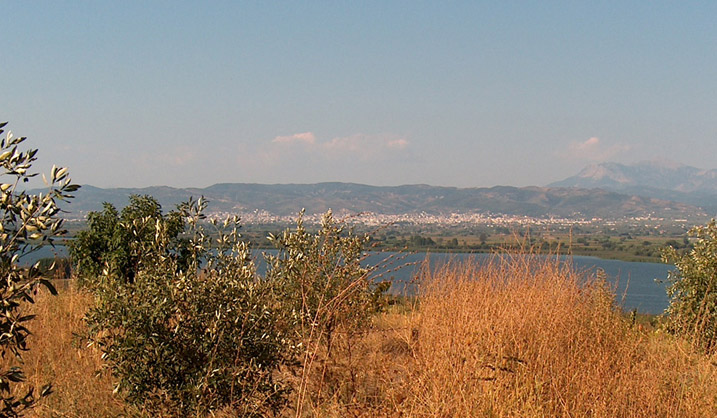

- Location within Greece
- Location: Aetolia-Acarnania
- Coordinates: 38°33′40″N 21°22′10″E
- Type: Natural Lake
- Primary inflows: Ermitsa, canal from Lake Trichonida
- Primary outflows: Dimikos
- Basin countries: Greece
- Max. length: 5.5 km (3.4 mi)
- Max. width: 2.5 km (1.6 mi)
- Surface area: 13.2 km^{2} (5.1 sq mi)
- Max. depth: 9 m (30 ft)
- Settlements: Agrinio

Lysimachia (Greek: Λυσιμαχία) is a lake in Aetolia-Acarnania, western Greece. Its area is 13.2 km^{2}, its depth is around 9 m. It is fed by the small river Ermitsa, and by a canal that connects the lake with the larger Lake Trichonida to its east. Its outflow is the river Dimikos, which drains into the river Acheloos. The city of Agrinio lies 6 km to the northeast.

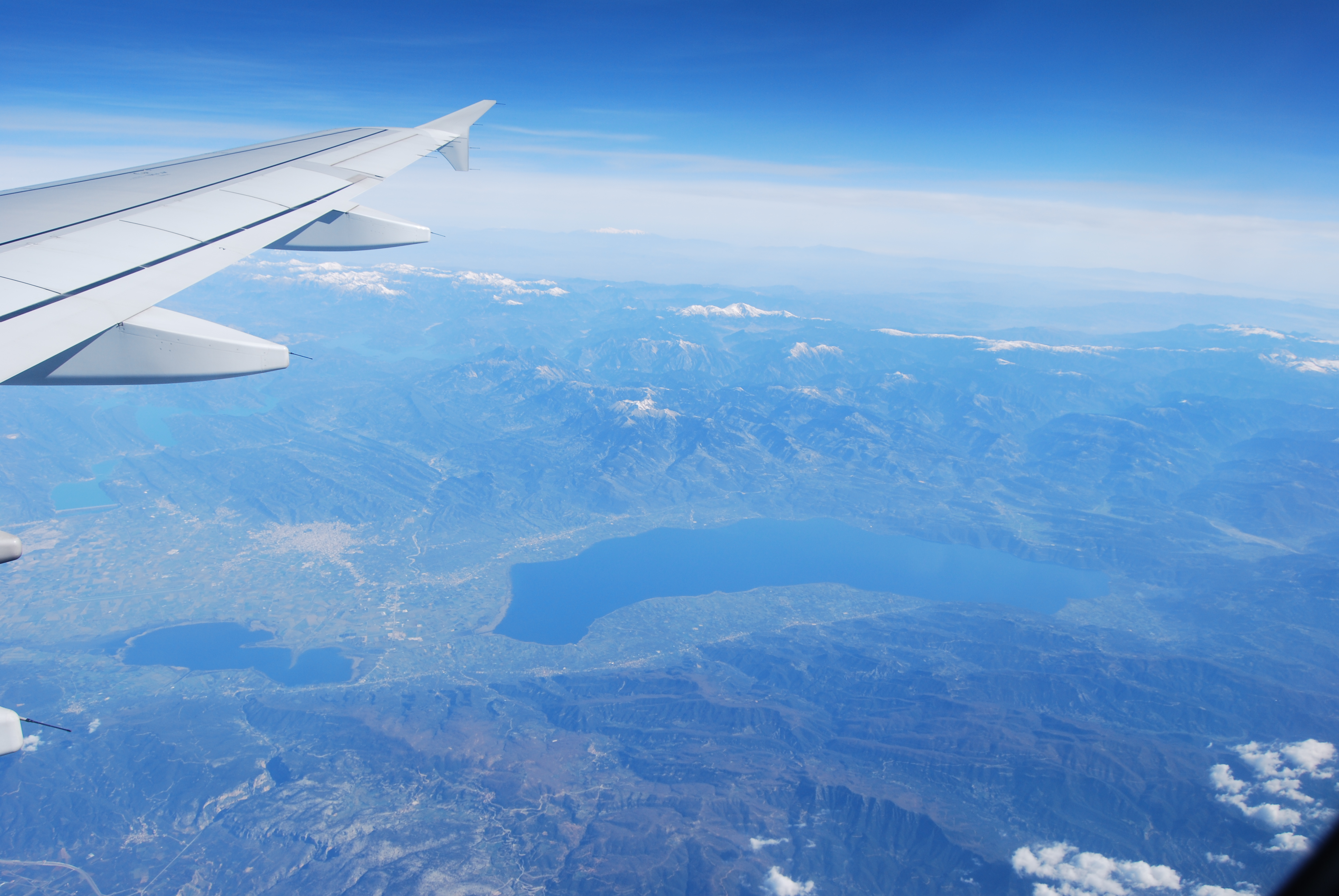
Lakes Lysimachia and Trichonida from the air

== See also ==
- Lysimachia (Aetolia)
- Lysimachus
