= Metapa (Greece) =

Town in ancient Aetolia

Coordinates: 38°31′27″N 21°34′55″E

Metapa (Ancient Greek: ἡ Μέταπα) was a town in ancient Aetolia, situated on the northern shore of Lake Trichonis, at the entrance of a narrow defile, and 59stadia from Thermum. It was burnt by Philip V of Macedon, on his invasion of Aetolia, in 218 BC, as he returned from the capture of Thermum.

Its site is located near the modern Analipsis.
