= List of settlements in the Euboea regional unit =

This is a list of settlements in the Euboea regional unit, Greece.

- Achladeri
- Achladi
- Aetos
- Afrati
- Agdines
- Agia Anna
- Agia Sofia
- Agios Athanasios
- Agios Dimitrios
- Agios Georgios
- Agios Ioannis
- Agios Loukas
- Agios Nikolaos
- Agios Vlasios
- Agios
- Agriovotano
- Aktaio
- Aliveri
- Almyropotamos
- Amarynthos
- Amelantes
- Amfithea
- Amygdalia
- Andronianoi
- Ano Kourouni
- Ano Potamia
- Ano Vatheia
- Argyro
- Artemisio
- Asmini
- Attali
- Avgaria
- Avlonari
- Chalcis
- Dafnoussa
- Drosia
- Dystos
- Ellinika
- Enoria
- Eretria
- Farakla
- Faros
- Fylla
- Galatsades
- Galatsona
- Gavalas
- Gerakiou
- Gialtra
- Giannitsi
- Glyfada
- Grampia
- Gymno
- Istiaia
- Kadi
- Kalimerianoi
- Kallianos
- Kallithea
- Kalochori-Panteichi
- Kalyvia
- Kamaria
- Kamaritsa
- Kampia
- Karystos
- Kastaniotissa
- Kastella
- Kathenoi
- Kato Kourouni
- Katsaroni
- Kechries
- Kerameia
- Kerasia
- Kipoi
- Kirinthos
- Kokkinomilea
- Komito
- Konistres
- Kontodespoti
- Koskina
- Kotsikia
- Kourkouloi
- Kremastos
- Krieza
- Kryoneritis
- Kymi
- Kyparissi
- Lepoura
- Lichada
- Limni
- Loukisia
- Loutra Aidipsou
- Loutsa
- Makrychori
- Makrykapa
- Maletianoi
- Manikia
- Mantoudi
- Marmari
- Melissonas
- Mesochoria
- Metochi Dirfyon
- Metochi
- Milies
- Mistros
- Monodryo
- Monokarya
- Myloi
- Mytikas
- Nea Artaki
- Nea Lampsakos
- Nea Styra
- Neochori
- Neos Pyrgos
- Nerotrivia
- Oktonia
- Oreoi
- Orio
- Orologi
- Oxylithos
- Pagontas
- Paliouras
- Pappades
- Paradeisi
- Paralia Avlidas
- Partheni
- Petries
- Pilio
- Pissonas
- Platana
- Platanistos
- Politika
- Polypotamos
- Pournos
- Prasino
- Prokopi
- Psachna
- Pyrgi
- Pyrgos
- Rovies
- Seta
- Skepasti
- Skyros
- Spathari
- Stavros
- Steni Dirfyos
- Stouppaioi
- Strofylia
- Stropones
- Styra
- Taxiarches
- Taxiarchis
- Tharounia
- Theologos
- Trachili
- Triada
- Vasilika
- Vasiliko
- Vathy
- Velos
- Vitala
- Vlachia
- Vounoi
- Voutas
- Vrysi
- Zarakes

== By municipality ==
Skyros (no subdivisions)

== See also ==
- List of towns and villages in Greece
