= Cnemis =

Mountain in Greece

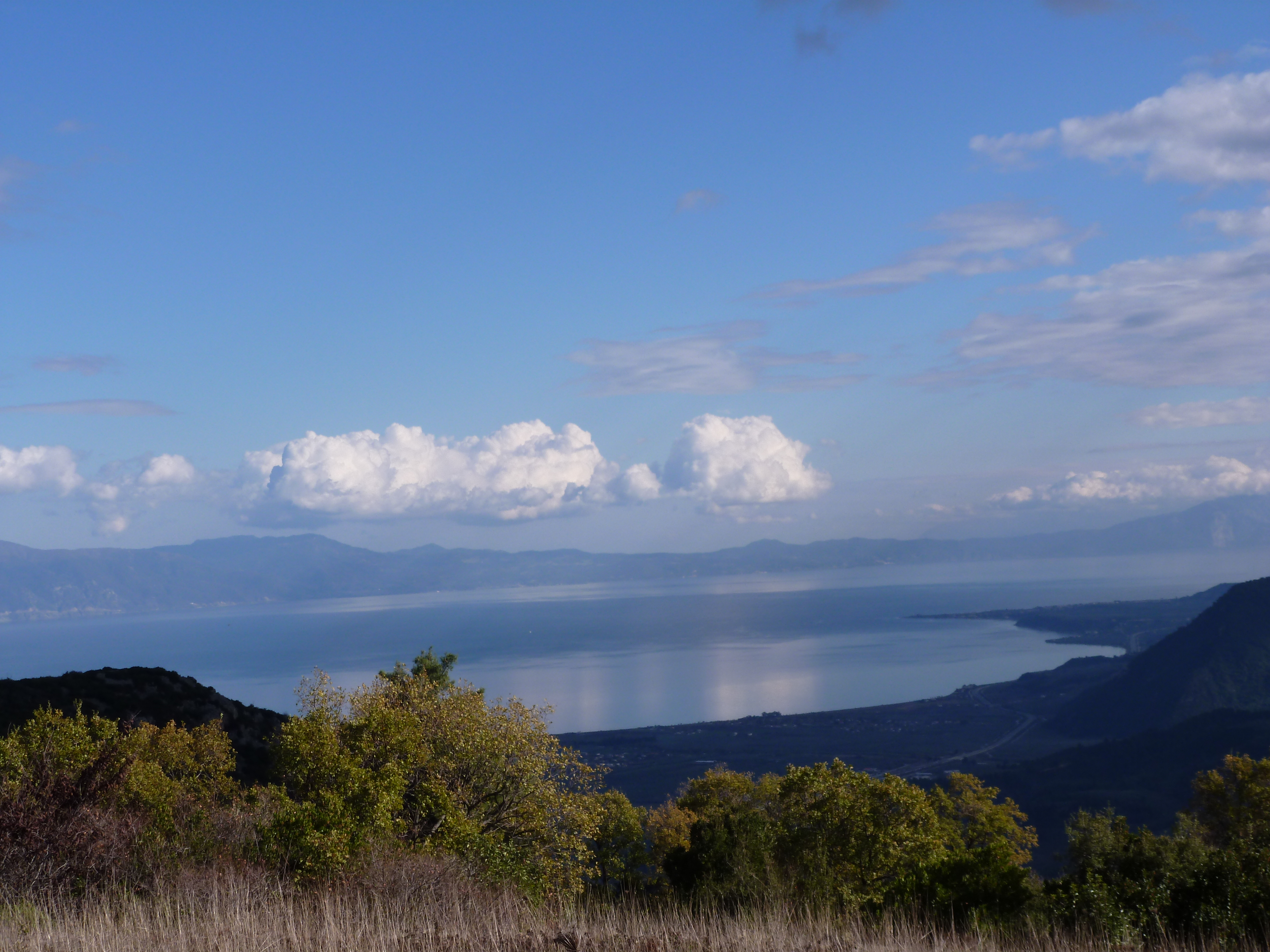
- View from the Callidromus protected reserve, some of which is on Cnemis. Visible are its north slopes, home of the Epicnemidian Locrians. The Gulf of Euboea is in the background.

Highest point
- Elevation: 945 m (3,100 ft)
- Coordinates: 38°44′53″N 22°48′21″E

Naming
- Native name: Κνῆμις (Ancient Greek)

Geography
- Location within Greece

Cnemis or Knemis (Ancient Greek: Κνῆμις; Greek: Κνημίς) was either a range of mountains between the Cephissus Valley and the Gulf of Euboea combined with the Malian Gulf, or was a single mountain located in the northwest of that range. The valley formed the heartland of Phocis, where the river originated, before entering Boeotia north of Orchomenos. The uncertainty of what terrain was meant by "Cnemis" derives from the varying accounts of the many sources.

The narrower meaning is based on the home territory of the Epicnemidian Locrians, who received their distinguishing name from this mountain, on the northern slopes of which they made their homes. Mount Cnemis was a continuation of Callidromus, with which it was connected by a ridge, at the foot of which is the modern village of Mendenitsa. Callidromus is the mountain that overhangs Thermopylae. It is usually not counted as part of Cnemis, which is the next mountain east.

The account of Cnemis in Smith, based on some of the ancient sources, seems to pinpoint the location of the populated mountain. A spur of this mountain, Smith says, running out into the sea, formed the promontory Cape Cnemides (Κνημῖδες), opposite the islands called Lichades and the Euboean promontory Cenaeum. Upon Cape Cnemides stood a fortress, also called Cnemides (or Cnemis), distant 20 stadia from Thronium.
