= Nea Sinasos =

Village in Euboea, Greece

Nea Sinasos Νέα Σινασός
- Settlement
- Location within Greece
- Coordinates: 38°58′N 23°10′E
- Country: Greece
- Administrative region: Central Greece
- Regional unit: Euboea
- Municipality: Istiaia-Aidipsos
- Municipal unit: Istiaia
- Community: Istiaia

Population (2021)
  - Total: 465
- Time zone: UTC+2 (EET)
  - Summer (DST): UTC+3 (EEST)
- Vehicle registration: ΧΑ

Nea Sinasos (Greek: Νέα Σινασός) is a village in the northern part of the island of Euboea in Greece. It is situated northeast of the town of Istiaia, on the road to Artemisio. It was founded in the mid-1920s by refugees originating from Sinasos (present Mustafapaşa near Ürgüp) in Cappadocia.

== Historical population ==
Year	Population
1991	620
2001	596
2011	565
2021	465

== See also ==
- List of settlements in the Euboea regional unit
