= Saint George Monastery, Aidipsos =

Saint George Monastery
- Μονή Αγίου Γεωργίου

Monastery information
- Established: 1670
- Dedicated to: Saint George
- Celebration date: April 23; November 3
- Diocese: Metropolis of Chalcis

Site
- Location: Ilia, Istiaia-Aidipsos, Euboea
- Country: Greece
- Coordinates: 38°51′58″N 23°6′51″E

The Saint George Monastery (Greek: Μονή Αγίου Γεωργίου) is located in northern Euboea, northwest and near the village of Ilia, on a slope of Mount Valanti with an altitude of 386 meters.

It is 13 km E.-SE. from Edipsos and 25 km. S.-SW. from Istiaea (municipality seat). It is a nunnery that was founded in 1670, but according to tradition it is older, from the 13th century. The katholikon of the monastery is cruciform and its iconostasis was built in the 17th century. During the Turkish occupation, the monastery was destroyed three times.

In the monastery there are relics of Saints George, Marina, Mamas and Kyriaki. As a separate settlement, it has been registered since 1835 under the name Moni Ilias or Saint George, which from 1912 with the Official Gazette 245A - 16/08/1912 was corrected to Moni Saint George.

According to the Kallikratis plan, it belongs to the municipal community of Loutron Edipsos of the municipal unit of Aidipsos, of the Municipality of Istiaia-Aidipsos and according to the 2011 census, 7 nuns were enumerated.
