= Paralia =

Paralia (Greek: Παραλία, Paralía) is a Greek term meaning "beach" or "coastline".

== Towns ==
- Paralia, Achaea
- Paralia, Pieria
- Paralia Distomou
- Paralia Lygias
- Paralia Skotinas
- Paralia Avdira
- Paralia Panteleimonos
- Paralios Kaisareia, the Greek name for Caesarea Maritima

== Beaches ==
- Paralia Chiladou
- Paralia Koulouras
- Paralia Sergoula
- Paralia Platanos

== Historical places ==
- Paralia (Attica), region of Attica
- Paralia (Seleucid eparchy)
- Phoenice Paralia

== Animals ==
- Agdistis paralia
