= Zarakes =

Zarakes Ζάρακες
- Community
- Location within Greece
- Coordinates: 38°18′04″N 24°11′31″E
- Country: Greece
- Administrative region: Central Greece
- Regional unit: Euboea
- Municipality: Kymi-Aliveri
- Municipal unit: Dystos

Population (2021)
  - Community: 632
- Time zone: UTC+2 (EET)
  - Summer (DST): UTC+3 (EEST)

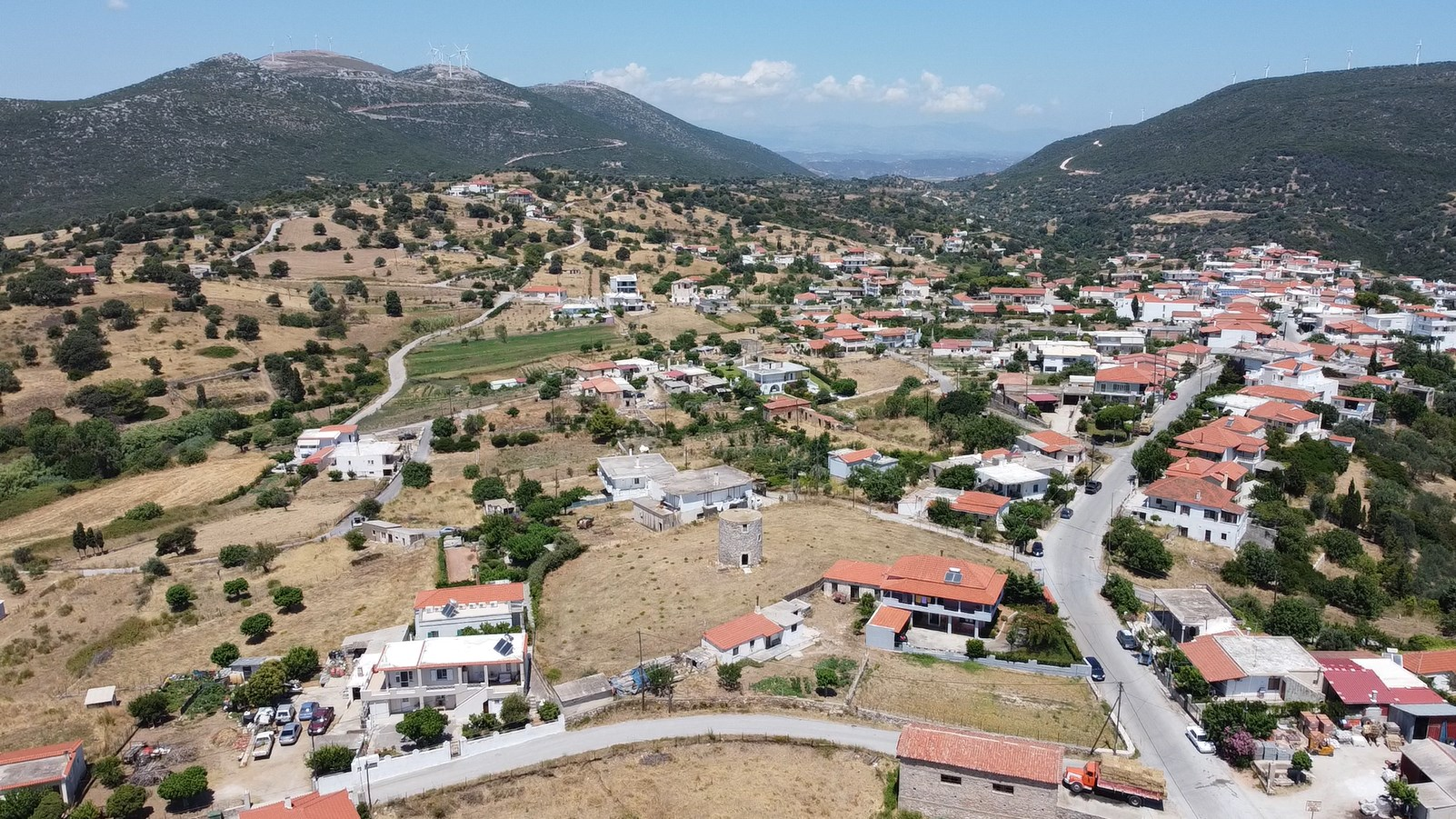
An aerial view of Zarakes and surrounding area

Zarakes (Greek: Ζάρακες, before 1953: Ζάρκα - Zarka) is a village and a community in the Dystos municipal unit of Euboea, Greece. Its population was 632 according to the latest census (2021). The village has historically been Arvanitika speaking.

The community of the same name (Δημοτική Κοινότητα Ζαράκων) comprises Zarakes proper and Paralia Zarakon (Zarakes Beach).

An ancient fortress near Zarakes has been identified with the Eretrian fort of Zaretra (Ancient Greek: Ζάρητρα) mentioned by Plutarch.

Attractions in Zarakes include:

- Old village of Zarakes, also known as Μαχαλάς (Mahalas)
- Old mills
- archaeological site of Zarakes near Zoodochos Pigi church
- Old church of Saint Charalampus in old village

== Notable people ==
- Nikos Tranos, sculptor
- Thanasis Bourandas, politician
