= Church of the Nativity of the Theotokos, Limni =

Nativity of the Theotokos Church
- Ιερός Ναός Γεννήσεως Θεοτόκου
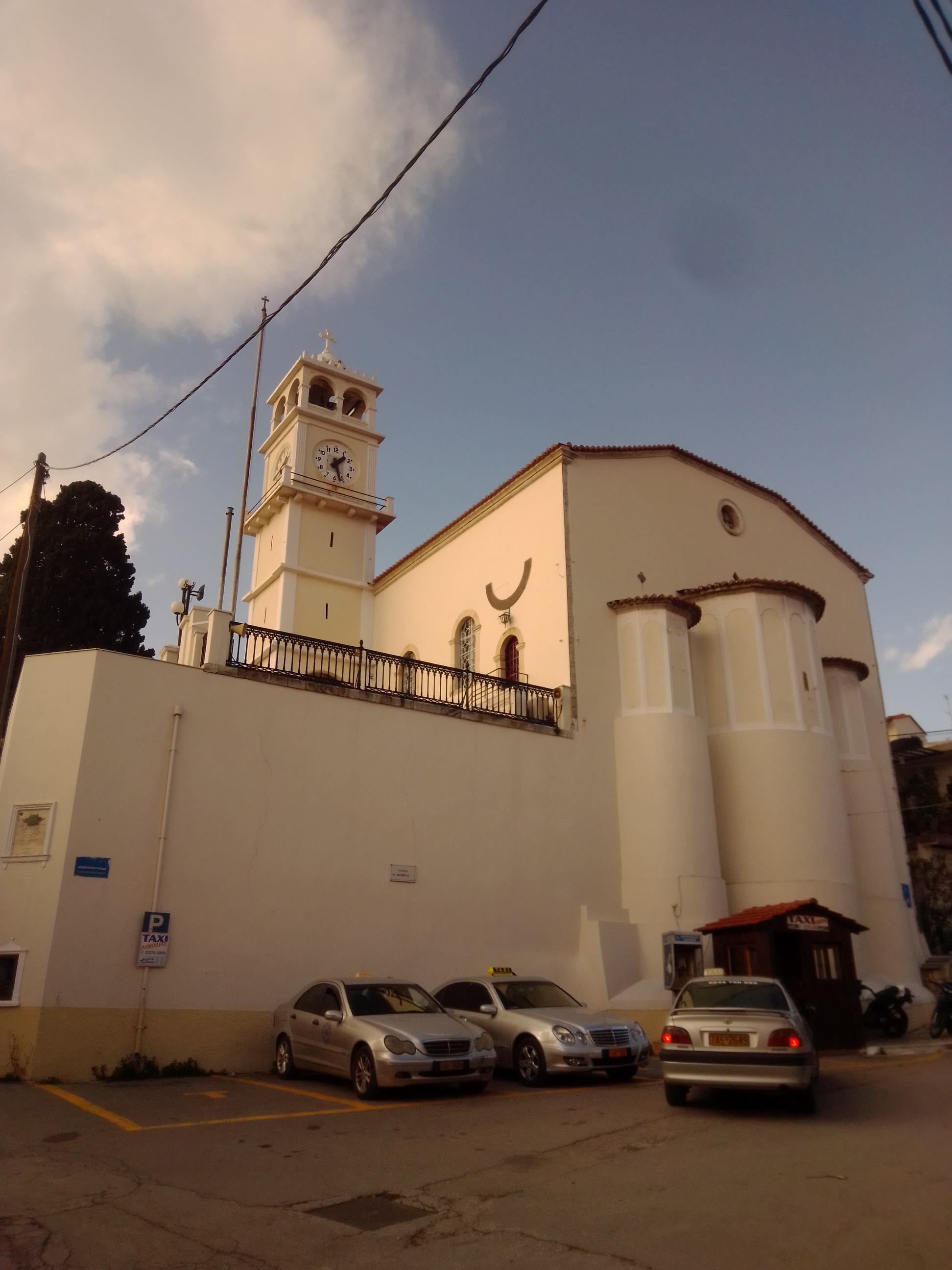

- Location within Greece
- 38°45′54″N 23°19′1″E
- Location: Limni, Euboea
- Country: Greece
- Language: Greek
- Denomination: Greek Orthodox

History
- Status: Open

Architecture
- Completed: 1841

Administration
- Metropolis: Metropolis of Chalcis, Istiaia and Northern Sporades

The Nativity of the Theotokos Church (Greek: Ιερός Ναός Γεννήσεως Θεοτόκου) is located in Limni, Euboea. It was built in the period 1837-1841 and is a representative monument of modern Greek ecclesiastical architecture.

It functions as a parish church, which belongs to the Metropolis of Chalcis, Istiaia and Northern Sporades. It is of particular interest at the level of architecture, painting, sculpture and miniature art.

== Location ==
The Church of the Nativity of the Theotokos is located in the center of the town of Limni, which belongs to the municipality of Mantoudi-Limni-Agia Anna in the prefecture of Euboea. It has been designated as a building in need of special state protection, as stated in a relevant marble inscription. The surface of the building is 295 square meters and it is built on a rock, as a result of which it is visible from most parts of the town. On the south and west sides of the temple there is a courtyard area of two levels, which communicate with each other by a stone staircase. The clock tower adjoins the southern wall. The bell tower is built in the northern part of the church, as well as the parish center.

== Holy relics ==
In a silver reliquary there are pieces of relics of Saint Nicholas, Saint Barbara and Saint Mama. In another silver case is kept one of the pillows placed on the chariot of Saint Christodoulos in Patmos. There is also a reliquary in the shape of a hand where parts of the hand of Saint Minas are kept. Important relics and old books are kept in two wooden showcases, located respectively in the north and south aisles of the church. For example, a cloth antimensium of the Archbishop of Chalcis, Kallinikos Kampanis (dated 1871), a Russian epitaph from the end of the 19th century, a handwritten leather-bound music book from 1746, Theo and Holy Gospel from 1754, etc.

== History of the temple ==
The traces of the parish church of Limni follow those of the movements of its inhabitants both during the Byzantine period and during the Turkish occupation. On the hill "Panagia", which is located north of today's Limni, the inhabitants of Elymnion built, between the 9th and 10th centuries, their first parish church and dedicated it to the Nativity of the Virgin. This temple was used until the first quarter of the 16th century.

At that time, the Ottoman conquerors began to allow the movement of populations to places where they could live better. The same thing happened with the inhabitants of Elymnios, who left the hills "Kastrias" and "Panagia" to settle, now permanently, on the coastal part where the Limni is today. There they built their new parish church, on the spot where the present church of the Nativity of the Theotokos is located. The inhabitants built their first houses around it. During the years of the Turkish occupation, the people of Limnia will develop special ties with their parish church. This temple will cover the needs of the inhabitants until July 1823, when it is destroyed by the Turks, while the Limni itself suffered general destruction from the troops of Yusuf Berkoftsali Pasha, who invaded Northern Euboea.

In 1830, with the London protocol, the first independent Greek state was established, which included the island of Euboea. As for the town of Limni, this event resulted in the gradual return of its inhabitants to their homes. Between 1832 and 1833 they roughly built a small temple on the ruins of the one destroyed by the Turks. In 1837, however, he will be characterized as unfit and unfit. At the same time, the Limni will increase in population due to its maritime development and agricultural exploitation, which it experienced, as a result of which the urgent need to build a new and larger parish church will appear, in order to serve the needs of its flock.

On March 31, 1837, the Municipal Council of the Aegean Municipality, in its meeting, decided to build a church in Limni, on the foundations of the already existing one, the capacity of which should be proportional to its population. In fact, the financing of the project would be ensured exclusively by the contributions of its residents. For this purpose, a six-member committee was set up from reputable citizens of Limni.

Among the first to rush to contribute financially to the construction of the church were the captains and ship owners of the town, making their first appearance in the social life of Limni as an organized professional class. In 1840, they were dealt with by renting pastures, granting plots, as well as renting the community house. The income from all of the above would be used for the completion of the temple. The project was finally completed at the end of 1841.

== Sources ==
- Ιερά Μητρόπολη Χαλκίδος, Ιστιαίας και Βορείων Σποράδων
- ΔΙΟΝΥΣΙΑΤΟΥ, ΘΕΟΚΛΗΤΟΥ (2019). ΠΑΝΑΓΙΑ Η ΛΙΜΝΙΑ. ΛΙΜΝΗ ΕΥΒΟΙΑΣ: ΙΕΡΟΣ ΝΑΟΣ Η ΓΕΝΝΗΣΙΣ ΤΗΣ ΘΕΟΤΟΚΟΥ ΛΙΜΝΗΣ ΕΥΒΟΙΑΣ.
- ΔΟΥΚΟΥΡΗΣ, ΒΑΣΙΛΗΣ (2003). Ο ΕΝΟΡΙΑΚΟΣ ΝΑΟΣ ΤΗΣ ΓΕΝΝΗΣΕΩΣ ΤΗΣ ΘΕΟΤΟΚΟΥ ΣΤΗ ΛΙΜΝΗ Β.ΕΥΒΟΙΑΣ. ΛΙΜΝΗ: ΕΝΟΡΙΑΚΟΣ ΝΑΟΣ ΛΙΜΝΗΣ. ISBN 960-7103-28-9.
- ΙΩΑΝΝΟΥ, ΝΑΘΑΝΑΗΛ (1857). ΕΥΒΟΪΚΑ ΗΤΟΙ ΙΣΤΟΡΙΑ ΠΕΡΙΕΟΥΣΑ ΤΕΣΣΑΡΩΝ ΕΤΩΝ ΠΟΛΕΜΟΥΣ ΤΗΣ ΝΗΣΟΥ ΕΥΒΟΙΑΣ. ΕΡΜΟΥΠΟΛΗ: ΤΥΠΟΓΡΑΦΙΑ Ν. ΒΑΡΒΑΡΕΣΟΥ.
- "Σύναξη της Παναγίας της Λιμνιάς στη Λίμνη Ευβοίας". Ορθόδοξος Συναξαριστής. 12 December 2014.
