= Cape Cnemides =

Cape Cnemides or Knemides (Ancient Greek: Κνημῖδες; Greek: Κνημίς, romanized: Knemis or Knimis or Κνημίδος) in ancient times was a spur of Mount Cnemis, running out into the sea, opposite the islands called Lichades and the Euboean promontory Cenaeum. Upon Cape Cnemides stood a fortress, also called Cnemides (or Cnemis), distant 20 stadia from Thronium.

Apart from some ambiguity about the extent of Cnemis, whether it was the entire range along the Gulf of Euboea or just one mountain in it, Smith's description certainly applies to the modern Cnemis. The Lichades bear the same name as they did in ancient times, identifying the promontory of Euboea.
