= Oreoi =

Oreoi Ωρεοί
- Municipal unit
- Location within the regional unit

- Location within Greece
- Coordinates: 38°57′N 23°06′E
- Country: Greece
- Administrative region: Central Greece
- Regional unit: Euboea
- Municipality: Istiaia-Aidipsos

Area
  - Municipal unit: 49.9 km^{2} (19.3 sq mi)

Population (2021)
  - Municipal unit: 2,827
  - Municipal unit density: 56.7/km^{2} (147/sq mi)
  - Community: 1,136
- Time zone: UTC+2 (EET)
  - Summer (DST): UTC+3 (EEST)
- Vehicle registration: ΧΑ

Oreoi (Greek: Ωρεοί) is a village and a former municipality in Euboea, Greece. It was named after the ancient town of Oreus. Since the 2011 local government reform, it is part of the municipality Istiaia-Aidipsos, of which it is a municipal unit. The municipal unit has an area of 49.913 km^{2} and population of 2,827 (2021). It is situated on the northwest coast of the island Euboea, by the Oreoi Strait that connects the Aegean Sea with the North Euboean Gulf. The small port Agiokampos, 5 km west of Oreoi, is served by ferries to Glyfa on the mainland.

A large marble statue of a bull from a funerary monument of the 4th century B.C. was raised from the harbour of Oreoi in 1965, and is exhibited in the town.

== Subdivisions ==
The municipal unit Oreoi is subdivided into the following communities (2021 census population in square brackets):

- Oreoi [1,136]
- Kastaniotissa [214]
- Neos Pyrgos [783]
- Taxiarchis [694]

== History ==
Oreoi was named after the ancient town Oreus, that was also known as Histiaea. Oreus was situated at the eastern edge of the present village Oreoi. Oreoi was part of the municipality of Istiaia until 1912, when it became a separate community. It was elevated to municipality status in 1997. The last mayor of Oreoi, before it was merged into the new municipality Istiaia-Aidipsos, was Ioannis Stamatiou, elected in 2006.
