= Limni =

Limni may refer to:

- Lemnos (Limni in Turkish), a Greek island
- Limni, Euboea, a village in Euboea, Greece
