= Limni, Euboea =

Limni Λίμνη
- Community
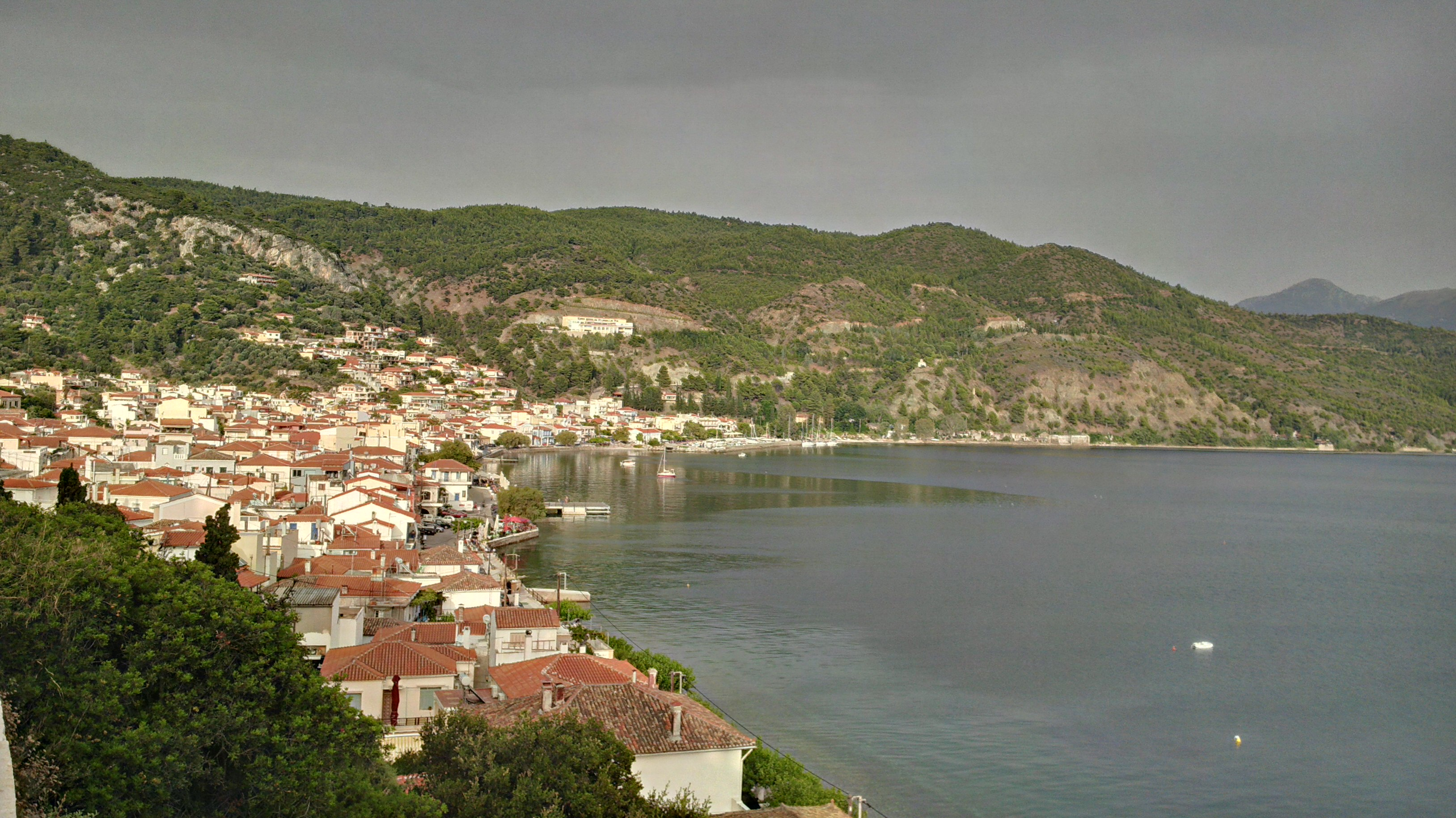

- Location within Greece
- Coordinates: 38°46′N 23°19′E
- Country: Greece
- Administrative region: Central Greece
- Regional unit: Euboea
- Municipality: Mantoudi-Limni-Agia Anna
- Municipal unit: Elymnioi

Population (2021)
  - Community: 1,961
- Time zone: UTC+2 (EET)
  - Summer (DST): UTC+3 (EEST)
- Postal code: 34005
- Vehicle registration: XA

Limni (Greek: Λίμνη meaning "lake") is a town and a community in the northwestern part of the island of Euboea, Greece. It is located northwest of Chalkida, the main city of Euboea, and southeast of the town of Istiaia. Limni is part of the municipal unit of Elymnioi, and it was the seat of the municipality Elymnioi. It is built at the foot of a mountain slope, on a bay of the North Euboean Gulf. It has been suggested as the site of the ancient city of Elymnion.

== Subdivisions ==
The community Limni consists of the following settlements:

- Limni
- Chronia
- Katounia
- Myrtias
- Retsinolakkos
- Sipias

== Population ==
Year	Village population	Community population
1981	2,896	-
1991	2,129	-
2001	2,083	2,673
2011	1,642	2,046
2021	1,565	1,961

== People ==
Limni was the home of the independence fighter Angelis Govios, Greek resistance activist Lela Karagianni and the film director and screenwriter Nikos Tsiforos. In 1959 the English writer Philip Sherrard bought part of disused magnesite mine near Limni, planted trees and plants where the former mine installations had been, and restored the abandoned homes of the former directors who had lived there before the Second World War. From 1977 until his death in 1995 it was his permanent home. Greek-American real estate magnate George M. Marcus was born in Limni in 1941.

== See also ==
- List of settlements in the Euboea regional unit
- Nativity of the Theotokos Church, Limni
