= Milies, Euboea =

Milies Μηλιές
- Community
- Location within Greece
- Coordinates: 38°57′N 23°16′E
- Country: Greece
- Administrative region: Central Greece
- Regional unit: Euboea
- Municipality: Istiaia-Aidipsos
- Municipal unit: Istiaia

Population (2021)
  - Community: 123
- Time zone: UTC+2 (EET)
  - Summer (DST): UTC+3 (EEST)
- Vehicle registration: ΧΑ

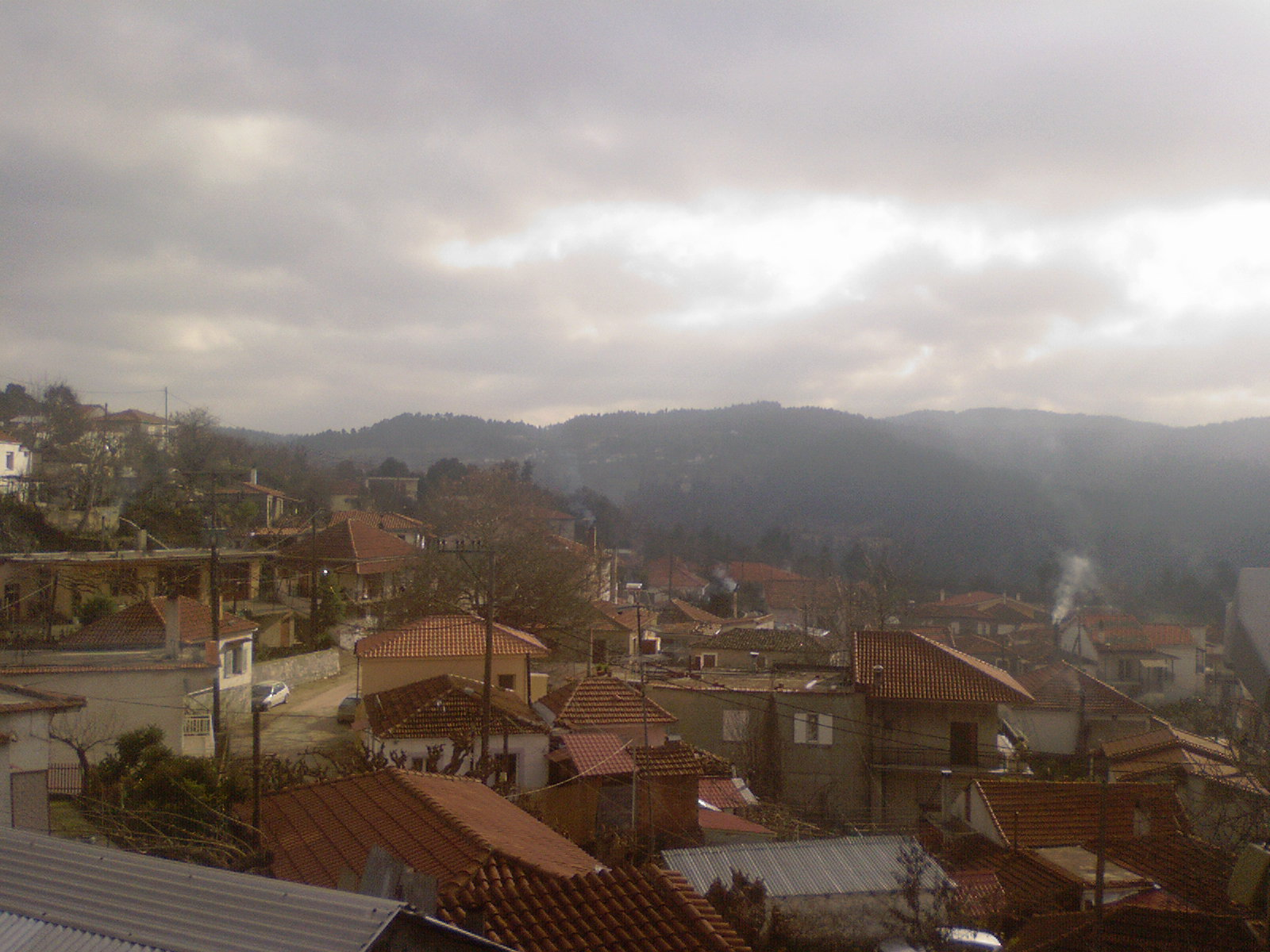
Milies, Euboea

Milies (Greek: Μηλιές) is a village in the municipal unit of Istiaia on Euboea island, Greece. Milies is located 15 km (9.3 mi) east of the town Istiaia, northwest of Chalkida and about 3 hours from the Greek capital city of Athens. Its elevation is 460 m (1,510 ft). It was an independent community until 1997 when it became a part of the municipality of Istiaia.

== Population ==
Year	Population
1981	323
1991	273
2001	213
2011	169
2021	123

== History ==
The modern village resulted from the merger of two previous settlements, Palaiovrysi (Παλαιόβρυση) and Karytsa (Καρύτσα), around the time of the Fall of Constantinople in 1453. Local tradition has it that some inhabitants later left to escape pirate attacks, and founded the village of Milies on Mount Pelion. Archaeological excavations in the nearby Lavrentis hill have shown the site to have been inhabited since Antiquity, with remains from the Classical and the Hellenistic periods discovered.

== See also ==
- List of settlements in the Euboea regional unit
