= Melies (disambiguation) =

Georges Méliès (1861–1938) was a French pioneering filmmaker.

Melies may also refer to:

- Gaston Méliès (1852–1915), French film director, brother of Georges Méliès
- Méliès d'Or, an award for European horror movies

== See also ==
- Milies (disambiguation)
