= Elymnion =

Ancient town in Greece

Elymnion (Ancient Greek: Ἐλύμνιον, Latin: Elymnium) was an ancient town of Euboea, Greece. It is mentioned in the play Peace by Aristophanes. The exact location is unknown, and several possible locations have been suggested, including the present town Limni on the coast of the North Euboean Gulf. The modern municipal unit Elymnioi took its name from ancient Elymnion.
