= Seta, Greece =

Seta Σέτα
- Community
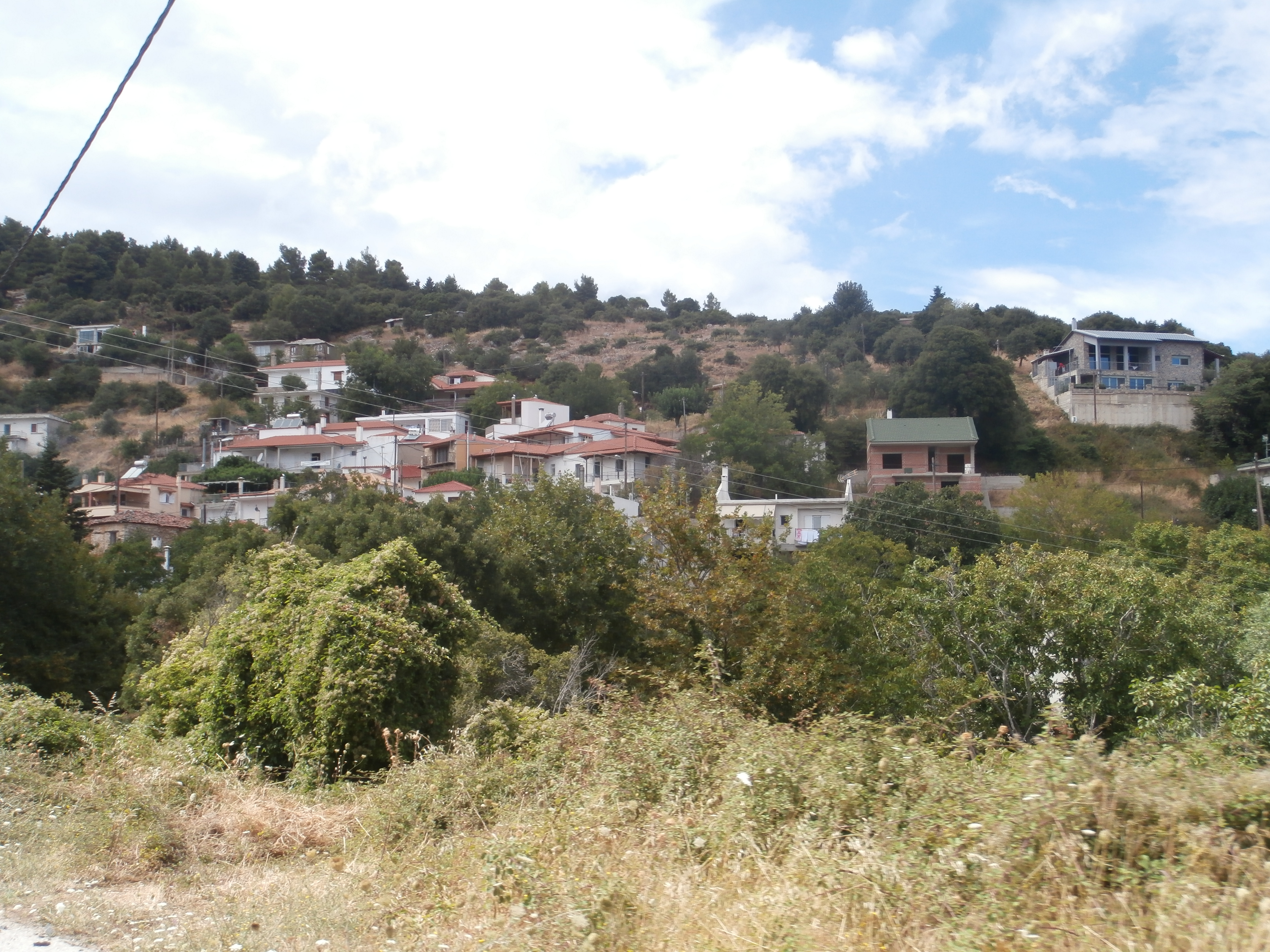
- View of Seta

- Location within Greece
- Coordinates: 38°32′N 23°55′E
- Country: Greece
- Administrative region: Central Greece
- Regional unit: Euboea
- Municipality: Eretria
- Municipal unit: Amarynthos

Population (2021)
  - Community: 151
- Time zone: UTC+2 (EET)
  - Summer (DST): UTC+3 (EEST)

Seta (Greek: Σέτα, also Σέττα - Setta) is a mountain village and a community in the northern part of the municipal unit of Amarynthos, on the island of Euboea, Greece. The community includes the village Kato Seta. It is situated in the mountainous interior of Euboea, northeast of the mountain Olympus and southeast of Dirfi, the highest mountain of the island. It is 10 km south of Stropones, 16 km north of Amarynthos and 30 km east of Chalcis. Seta suffered damage from the 2007 Greek forest fires.

== Population ==
Year	Village population	Community population
1981	-	266
1991	166	-
2001	147	201
2011	60	92
2021	93	151

== See also ==
- List of settlements in the Euboea regional unit
