= Cnemides =

Coordinates: 38°47′06″N 22°49′26″E

Cnemides or Knemides (Ancient Greek: Κνημῖδες), also Cnemis or Knemis (Κνῆμις), is the name of a fortress, and probably of a town, in ancient Phocis. Strabo places Cnemides on Cape Cnemides opposite the islands called Lichades and the Euboean promontory Cenaeum, distant 20 stadia from Thronium and from Daphnus. The Periplus of Pseudo-Scylax, successively describing towns along the Phocian coast, places Cnemides after Thronium and before Elateia and Panopeus.

The site of Cnemides is near the modern Gouvali.
