= Lichada =

Lichada Λιχάδα
- Municipal unit
- Location within the regional unit

- Location within Greece
- Coordinates: 38°51′N 22°52′E
- Country: Greece
- Administrative region: Central Greece
- Regional unit: Euboea
- Municipality: Istiaia-Aidipsos

Area
  - Municipal unit: 39.891 km^{2} (15.402 sq mi)
- Elevation: 37 m (121 ft)

Population (2021)
  - Municipal unit: 936
  - Municipal unit density: 23.5/km^{2} (60.8/sq mi)
- Time zone: UTC+2 (EET)
  - Summer (DST): UTC+3 (EEST)
- Postal code: 343 00
- Vehicle registration: ΧΑ

Lichada (Greek: Λιχάδα, Licháda) is a village in Euboea, in central Greece. Since the 2011 local government reform it is part of the municipality Istiaia-Aidipsos, of which it is a municipal unit. The municipal unit has an area of 39.891 km^{2}. The community includes the villages Agios Georgios, Vasilina, Gregolimano, Kavos, Kokkinias and the uninhabited islands Monolia and Strongyli. Lichada is located at the western tip of Euboea. It is 10 km north of Agios Konstantinos, 16 km west of Aidipsos, 37 km east of Lamia and 75 km northwest of Chalcis. Lichada suffered damage in the 2007 Greek forest fires.

== Population ==
Year	Settlement population	Community population
1981	-	1,016
1991	275	1,153
2001	240	1,140
2011	181	1,122
2021	123	936

== See also ==
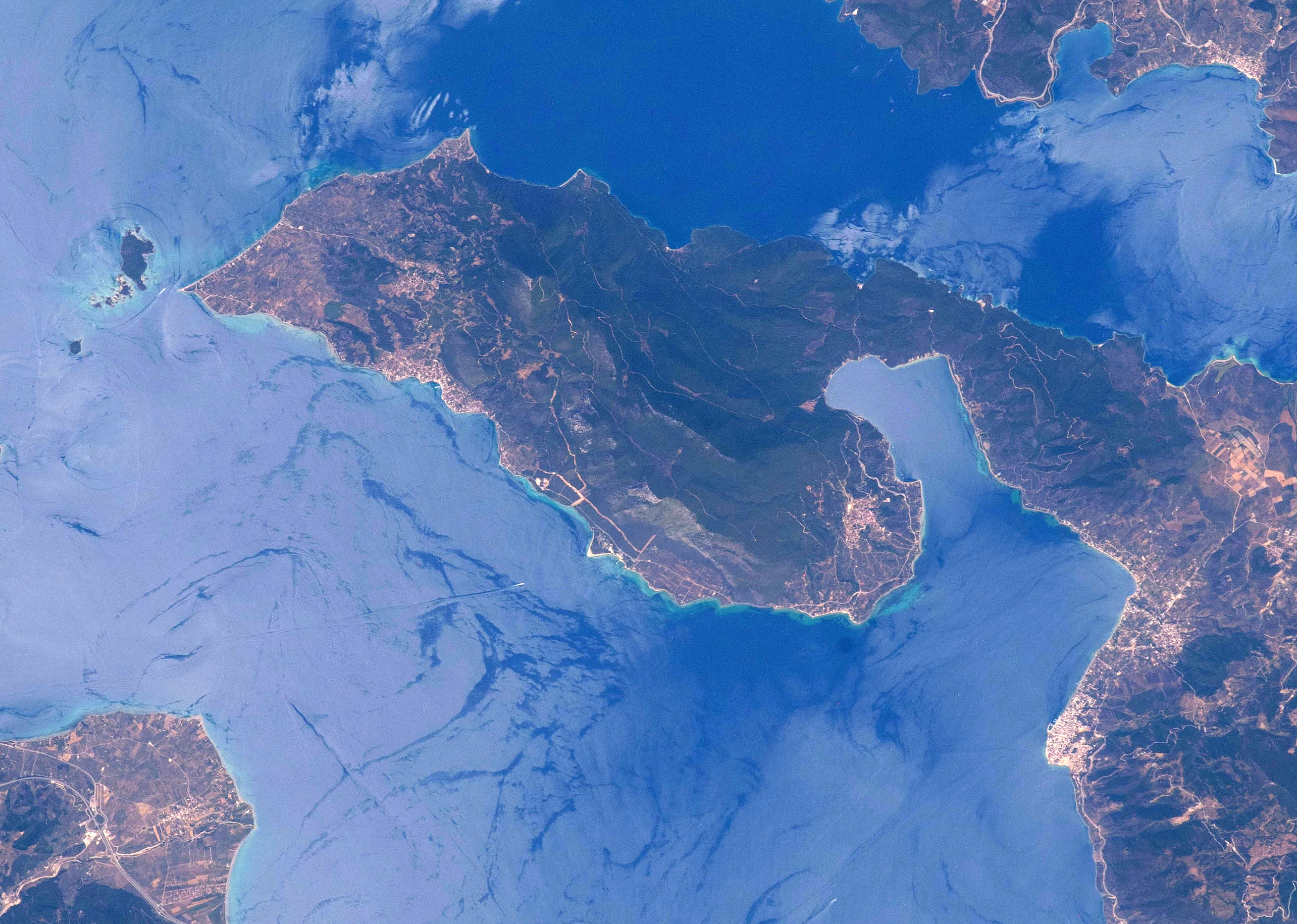
Cape Lichada, Lichades island group, Lichada peninsula of Euboea, villages, forested mountain Xerosouvala near of Gialtra

- List of settlements in the Euboea regional unit
