= Cumae (disambiguation) =

Cumae may refer to any of several ancient Greek cities (Greek Κύμη, also spelled Kymē, Cyme, or Cuma:

- Cumae (Italy), an ancient Greek colony near Naples
- Cumae (Euboea), modern Kymi
- Cumae (Aeolis)
