= Thanasis Bourandas =

Greek politician

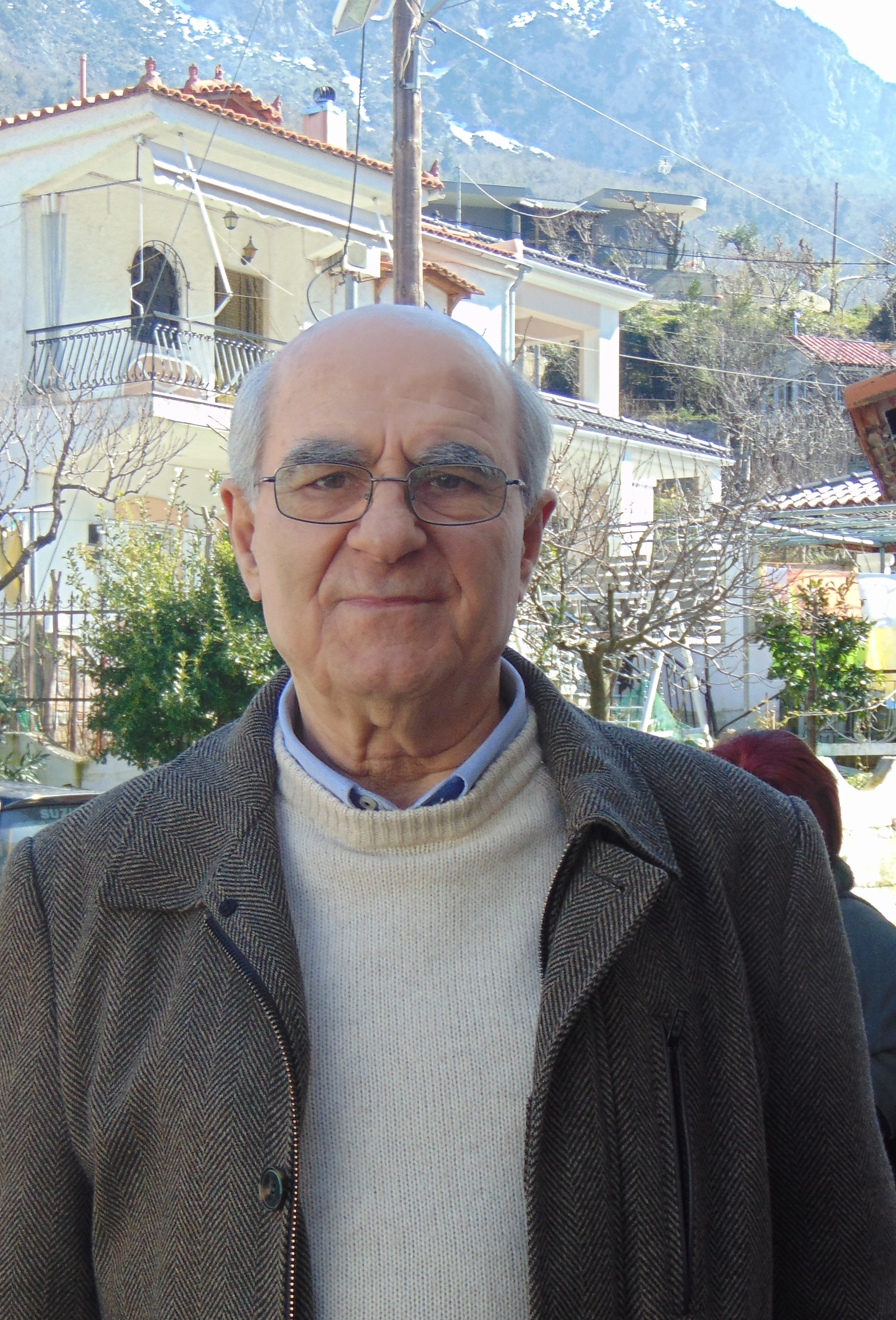
Thanasis Bourantas

Thanasis Bourantas (Θανάσης Μπουραντάς) (born 1945) is a local Greek politician. He was heavily involved in trade unions from the 1970s to the mid-1990s, including as leader of the Labour Centre of Euboea. He was elected as the first Prefect of Euboea in 1995 followed by his election as mayor of Kymi-Aliveri in 2014 and 2019. He was honoured for his work in April 2024 with a special event and award presented by the Regional Governor, Fanis Spanos.

== Personal life ==
=== Early years and trade union activity ===
Bourantas was born in 1945 in the village of Zarakes in Karystia, Greece. He was the son of George and Vasiliki.

He worked at the Public Power Corporation and began his involvement in trade unions, joining PASOK in its early days of foundation. He was a member of local PASOK Prefecture Committee until 1989.

== Political career ==
=== Deputy ===
His parliamentary career began in the 1990 Greek legislative elections when he was nominated as a PASOK candidate in Parliament. In the following elections in 1993, he was elected as a deputy for the constituency of Euboea.

=== Prefect ===
He was elected as the first prefect of Euboea in the 1994 elections with 52.8% of the vote. He won re-election in all subsequent elections until 2010 when the office was abolished.

=== Deputy Governor ===
In September 2010 Bourantas announced his campaign for Deputy Governor of Euboea on the same ticket as the PASOK candidate for Regional Governor of Central Greece, Klearchos Pergantas. He was successfully elected and served until 2014.

=== Mayor ===
Following his role as Deputy Governor, he successfully ran for election in 2014 as Mayor of Kymi-Aliveri with 51.8% of the vote. He won re-election in 2019 with 50.91% of the vote.
