= Ortari =

Mountain in Greece

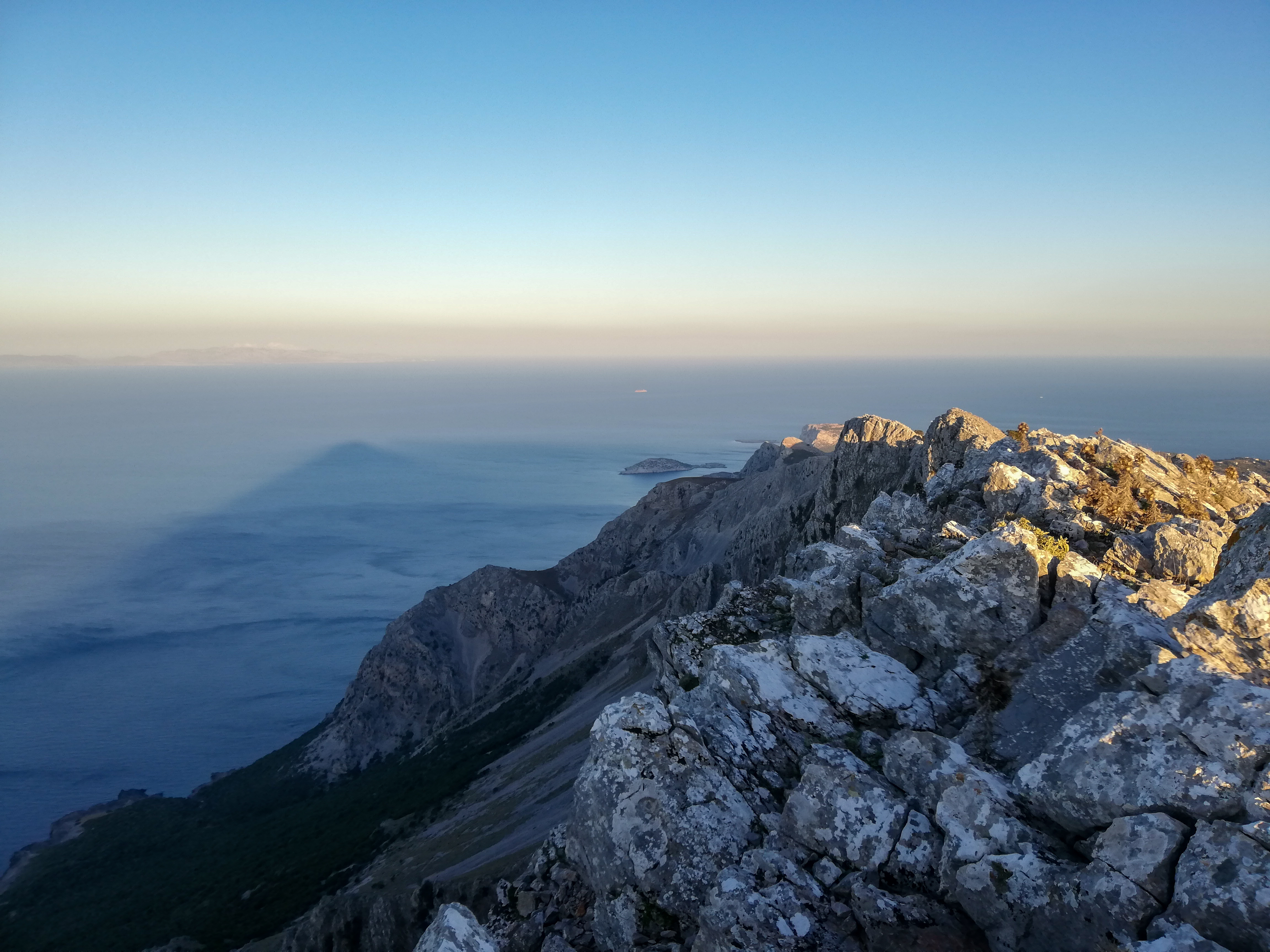
Ortari's shadow in the sea

Ortari is a mountain located within near the northwest of the city of Kymi on the island of Euboea.
