= Anthidona =

Anthidona Ανθηδόνα
- Municipal unit
- Location within the regional unit

- Location within Greece
- Coordinates: 38°29′N 23°27′E
- Country: Greece
- Administrative region: Central Greece
- Regional unit: Euboea
- Municipality: Chalcis

Area
  - Municipal unit: 137.3 km^{2} (53.0 sq mi)

Population (2021)
  - Municipal unit: 7,286
  - Municipal unit density: 53.07/km^{2} (137.4/sq mi)
  - Community: 1,062
- Time zone: UTC+2 (EET)
  - Summer (DST): UTC+3 (EEST)
- Vehicle registration: ΧΑ

Anthidona (Greek: Ανθηδόνα) is a former municipality in the Euboea regional unit, Greece. It was named after the ancient Boeotian city Anthedon. During the 2011 local government reform, it became a municipal unit of Chalcis. The population was 7,286 inhabitants at the 2021 census, and the land area is 137.266 km^{2}. The seat of the municipality was in Drosia. Although part of the Euboea regional unit, it is not located on the island Euboea, but on the mainland, attached to the northeastern part of Boeotia.
