= Kymi, Greece =

Town in Euboea, Greece

Kymi Κύμη
- Municipal unit
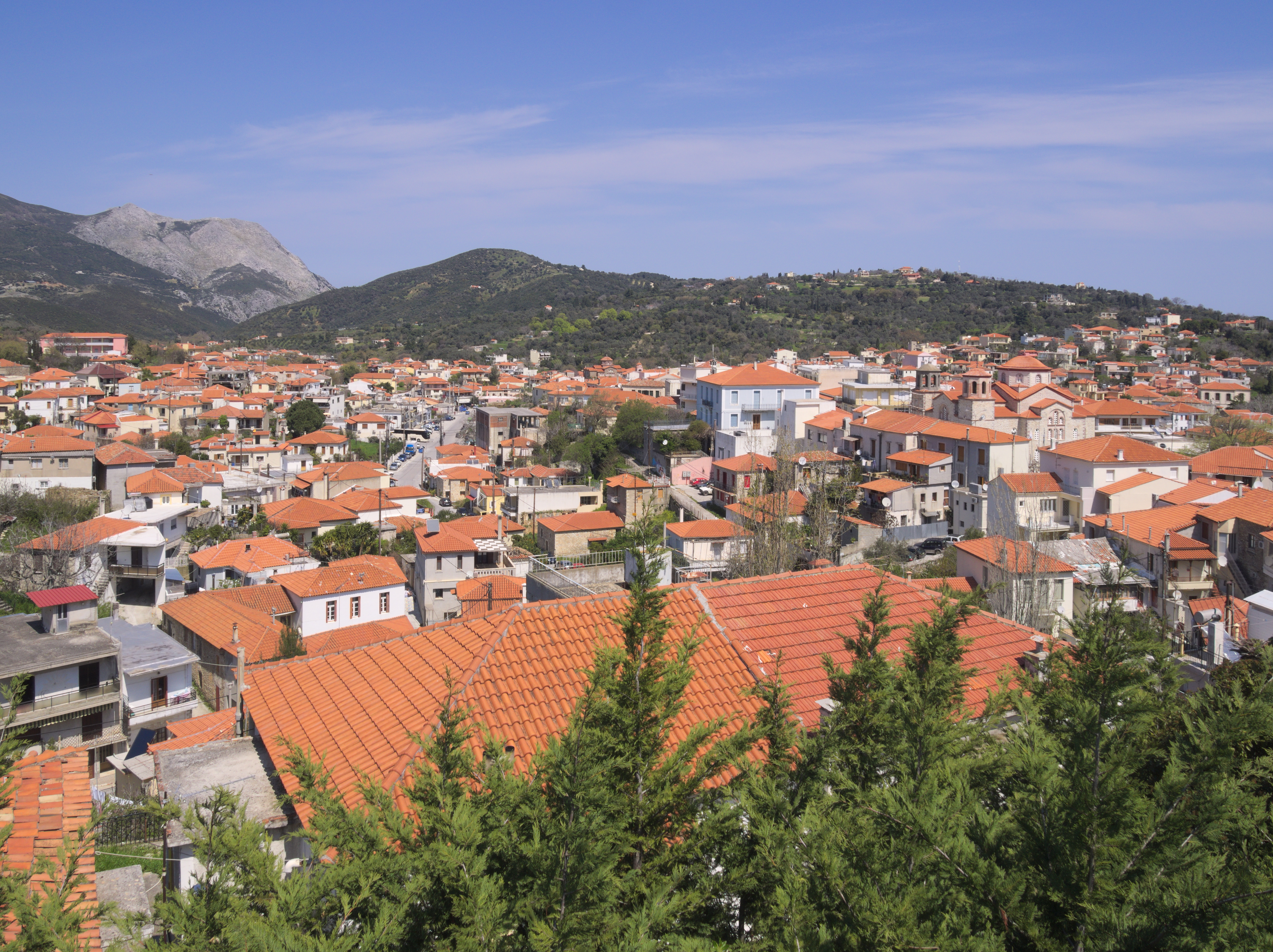
- Kymi in April 2015

- Location within the regional unit

- Location within Greece
- Coordinates: 38°38′N 24°06′E
- Country: Greece
- Administrative region: Central Greece
- Regional unit: Euboea
- Municipality: Kymi-Aliveri

Area
  - Municipal unit: 167.6 km^{2} (64.7 sq mi)

Population (2021)
  - Municipal unit: 6,706
  - Municipal unit density: 40.01/km^{2} (103.6/sq mi)
  - Community: 2,888
- Time zone: UTC+2 (EET)
  - Summer (DST): UTC+3 (EEST)
- Vehicle registration: ΧΑ

Kymi (Greek: Κύμη, Kýmē) is a coastal town and a former municipality (6,706 inhabitants in 2021) in the island of Euboea, Greece, named after an ancient Greek town of the same name. Since the 2011 local government reform it is part of the municipality Kymi-Aliveri, of which it is a municipal unit. The municipal unit has an area of 167.616 km^{2}.

== History ==
The ancient Euboean Kyme is mentioned as a harbor town related to the more prominent poleis of Chalkis and Eretria in antiquity. Together with these, it is sometimes named as the founding metropolis of the homonymous Kymē (Cumae) in Italy, an important early Euboean colony, which was probably named after it. According to Strabo, Hippocles of Cyme, an ancient Greek oecist, was from here. He, along with Megasthenes of Chalcis, founded the colony near the area where then Rome flourished. This new colony contributed its Euboean alphabet to the culture of the area, which subsequently became the Latin alphabet.

There are few relevant archaeological traces in the area and its exact location is not known. A Bronze Age settlement has been excavated in nearby Mourteri. Some modern authors believe that Kyme never existed as an independent polis in historical times but that it was a mere village dependent on either Chalkis or Eretria.

In a woodcut map of Euboea of 1528, by Benedetto Bordone, it is mentioned as Chimi.

== Geography ==
It is located on a hilltop near the shores, on the Aegean side of the Euboea island. It has its own port, down from the hilltop, serving a line to Skyros island and some commercial traffic. Ortari mountain is located northwest of Kymi.

== Attractions ==
Kymi is a small town and the surrounding region overlooks the Aegean Sea. Due to its vantage point, Kymi is sometimes called "The Balcony of the Aegean". Kymi has one of the largest man-made ports in the country and serves as a transportation hub for the eastern Aegean Islands and northern Greece. The city Kymi is considered the greenest of Greece in terms of native vegetation and is second all in clean sand beaches. There are numerous tourist and sightseeing attractions, such as the house of the noted pathologist and researcher George Papanicolaou, inventor of the Pap smear, the Folklore Museum of Kymi, the Monastery of the Transfiguration, three small Byzantine churches in Oxilithos, the Archaeological Collection and the Archaeological Sites, and a ruined Venetian tower in San handkerchief etc. The most well known agricultural products produced in Kymi are figs, cherries and olive oil. Local specialties include the "cocoon display," handicrafts made from cocoons, and sweets such as baklava and almond.

== Notable people ==
- Georgios Papanikolaou (1883–1962), physician, pioneer in cytology and early cancer detection, and inventor of the pap test for cervical cancer
- Nikolaos Pappas (1930–2013), Admiral and commander of the destroyer Velos, mutinied in 1973 in protest against the Regime of the Colonels, later Chief of the Greek Navy and government minister
- Ioannis Velissariou (1861–1913), Major and Balkan Wars military hero

== Climate ==
Climate data for Kymi
Month	Jan	Feb	Mar	Apr	May	Jun	Jul	Aug	Sep	Oct	Nov	Dec	Year
Mean daily maximum °C (°F)	12.1 (53.8)	12.6 (54.7)	14.1 (57.4)	17.9 (64.2)	21.9 (71.4)	26.1 (79.0)	27.6 (81.7)	27.1 (80.8)	24.6 (76.3)	20.5 (68.9)	17.2 (63.0)	14.0 (57.2)	19.6 (67.3)
Daily mean °C (°F)	9.9 (49.8)	10.2 (50.4)	11.7 (53.1)	15.2 (59.4)	19.3 (66.7)	23.7 (74.7)	25.3 (77.5)	24.8 (76.6)	22.1 (71.8)	18.1 (64.6)	14.7 (58.5)	11.7 (53.1)	17.2 (63.0)
Mean daily minimum °C (°F)	7.4 (45.3)	7.7 (45.9)	9.0 (48.2)	11.6 (52.9)	15.1 (59.2)	19.3 (66.7)	21.5 (70.7)	21.4 (70.5)	18.9 (66.0)	15.4 (59.7)	12.1 (53.8)	9.2 (48.6)	14.1 (57.4)
Source: yr.no

== Transportation ==
The road network in the Kymi region is quite underdeveloped. There is only one major road (regional road) connecting the city of Kymi with Chania Avlonariou (a part of Avlonari), Aliveri and from there to the Greek National Road 44 towards Chalkis and Karystos. There is also a half-unpaved road to Hiliadou beach and the nearby north Euboea villages.

The port connects to the island of Skyros, Skopelos, Alonnisos.

== Sports ==
Kymi has a few basketball courts, as well as an outdoor football pitch. There is also a sports club called Kymi Sports Club, with teams in football, basketball and volleyball.
