= Nea Artaki =

Town and former municipality in Greece

Nea Artaki Νέα Αρτάκη
- Municipal unit
- Location within the regional unit

- Location within Greece
- Coordinates: 38°31′N 23°38′E
- Country: Greece
- Administrative region: Central Greece
- Regional unit: Euboea
- Municipality: Chalcis
- City established: 1923 (103 years ago)

Area
  - Municipal unit: 23.015 km^{2} (8.886 sq mi)
- Elevation: 17 m (56 ft)

Population (2021)
  - Municipal unit: 10.302
  - Municipal unit density: 0.44762/km^{2} (1.1593/sq mi)
- Time zone: UTC+2 (EET)
  - Summer (DST): UTC+3 (EEST)
- Postal code: 346 00
- Area code: 22210
- Vehicle registration: ΧΑ

Nea Artaki (Greek: Νέα Αρτάκη) is a town and a former municipality on the island of Euboea in Greece. Since the 2011 local government reform it is a municipal unit, part of the municipality of Chalcis. The municipal unit has an area of 23.015 km^{2}. Nea Artaki is located north of Chalcis. The town was founded in 1923 by Greek refugees from the town of Erdek (Greek: Αρτάκη - Artaki). The Greek National Road 77 links it with Chalcis and northern Euboea. Nea Artaki is located in a plain that is surrounded with mountains to the east and the North Euboean Gulf lies to the west. Nea Artaki is a well known tourist destination, notably for its beaches.

== Historical population ==
Year	Population
1981	5,935
1991	7,394
2001	8,571
2011	9,489
2021	10,302

== See also ==
- List of settlements in the Euboea regional unit
