= Milies (disambiguation) =

Milies (Greek: Μηλιές) may refer to several places in Greece:

- Milies, a municipal unit in Magnesia
- Milies, Euboea, a village in Euboea
- Milies, Elis, a village in Elis
