= Tamyneoi =

Former municipality in Greece

Tamyneoi Ταμυνέοι
- Municipal unit
- Location within the regional unit

- Location within Greece
- Coordinates: 38°27′00″N 24°00′20″E
- Country: Greece
- Administrative region: Central Greece
- Regional unit: Euboea
- Municipality: Kymi-Aliveri

Area
  - Municipal unit: 203.97 km^{2} (78.75 sq mi)
- Elevation: 25 m (82 ft)

Population (2021)
  - Municipal unit: 8,581
  - Municipal unit density: 42.07/km^{2} (109.0/sq mi)
- Time zone: UTC+2 (EET)
  - Summer (DST): UTC+3 (EEST)
- Postal code: 345 00
- Area code: 22230
- Vehicle registration: ΧΑ

Tamyneoi (Greek: Ταμυνέοι, before 2001: Ταμιναίοι - Taminaioi, from Ancient Greek: Τάμυναι/Ταμῦναι Tamynai (Latin: Tamynae) or Τάμυνα/Τάμινα Tamyna/Tamina) is a former municipality of the island of Euboea, Greece. Since the 2011 local government reform it is part of the municipality Kymi-Aliveri, of which it is a municipal unit. The municipal unit has an area of 203.971 km^{2}. The seat of the municipality was in Aliveri. The name reflects that of the ancient city of Tamynae.

== Subdivisions ==
The municipal unit Tamyneoi is subdivided into the following communities (constituent villages in brackets):

- Agios Ioannis (Agios Ioannis, Akti Nireos)
- Agios Loukas (Agios Loukas, Paramerites, Prinias)
- Aliveri (Aliveri, Anthoupoli, Katakalos, Latas, Milaki)
- Gavalas
- Partheni (Partheni, Panagia)
- Prasino (Prasino, Panagitsa Pounta)
- Tharounia
- Trachili

== Historical population ==
Year	Population
2001	9,764
2011	8,986
2021	8,581
