= Angelis Govios =

Leader of the Greek War of Independence

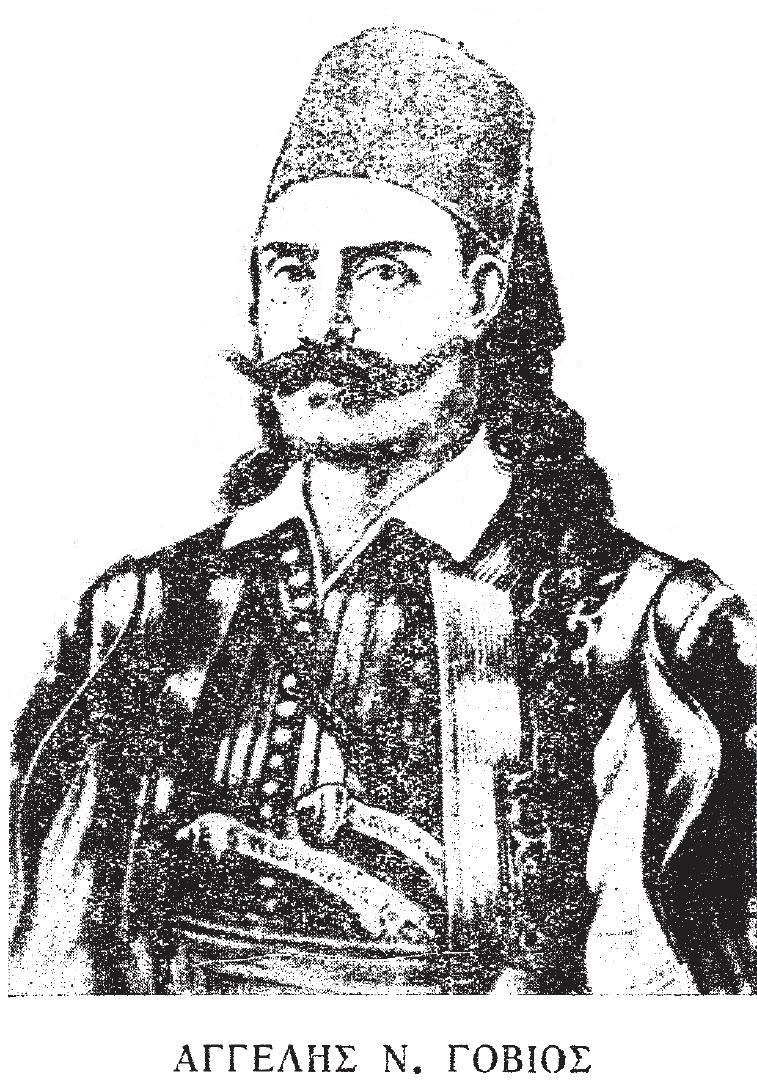
- A portrait of Angelis Govios
- Native name: Αγγελής Γοβιός
- Born: c. 1780; Limni, Sanjak of Eğriboz, Ottoman Empire (now Greece)
- Died: 28 March 1822 Dyo Vouna, Sanjak of Eğriboz, Ottoman Empire (now Greece)
- Allegiance: (Greece) First Hellenic Republic
- Branch: Hellenic Army
- Conflicts: Greek War of Independence †; Battle of Gravia Inn

Angelis Govios or Govginas (Greek: Αγγελής Γοβιός ή Γοβγίνας) was a leader of the Greek War of Independence. He is known for the reorganization of the Struggle against the Ottomans in Euboea. A statue in his honour has been erected near the Euboean town of Psachna.

== Biography ==
Angelis Govios was born in about 1780 in Limni, Euboea. According to the oral tradition of Limni, Angelis real surname was Tzoutzas or Tzotzas. "Govios" was a nickname. Along with Odysseas Androutsos, Athanasios Diakos and other leaders of the Greek Revolution of 1821, he served in the garrison of Ali Pasha. His participation in the battle of Gravia made him famous for his bravery and courage.

=== The reorganization of the military camp in Vrysakia ===
Angelis Govios arrived in Vrysakia in May 1821. There he managed to organize in a short period of time, the military camp and to turn the inexperienced men from Euboea into brave soldiers. In fact, they won their first major victory in the summer of 1821 in the battle against the organized army of Omer Vrioni, in the area of Messapia, near Psachna in Euboea. On July 15 Omer Vrioni, after the seizure of Livadeia, he wanted to suppress the Revolution in Euboea, in order to ensure safe passage for transportation and supplies to be able to move towards Athens. Therefore, he went to Vrysakia, where Govios with 300 men prepared to make a stand, while Govios' confidants Kotsos and Balalas took places in the eastern and southern part of the hill. The great strategic mind of Govios helped the Greeks to achieve a great victory against the more numerous army of Omer, after a battle that lasted seven hours. Three days later, Ali Pasha marched again against them, but Govios and his men had been withdrawn to Agios, so he only burnt the huts of the Greeks in Vrysakia and he returned to Chalkida, from where he soon decided to leave since the city fortress was very strong. When all the Turkish forces left, Govios rushed to recapture Vrysakia.

=== Govios' plans to capture Karystos and his death ===
In early 1822, when the siege of Karystos ended, Govios remained the sole leader of the Revolution in Euboea. His aim was to blockade the Turks of Chalkida and then to proceed against Karystos. Because he was aware of the difficulties, he asked for reinforcement from the fighters from Olympos, who were in Sporades, and other chieftains like his brother Anagnostis Govginas. The gathering of the fighters had been arranged to take place in Vrysakia on 28 March, at night. One thousand Turks realized that this certain meeting would take place and starting from Chalkida they took control of Dyo Vouna. From there, some riders headed towards Vrysakia. When Govios noticed the movements of Turks he wanted to face them immediately, without waiting for dawn. As a result, when tracking the Turkish Contingent he fell in an ambush in Dyo Vouna and he was completely encircled. In the scuffle that followed Govios and his brother Anagnostis were killed. However, most Greek soldiers managed to escape. Govios' death deprived the Revolution in Euboea of a significant leader.

== Bibliography ==
- Ιστορία Ελληνικού Έθνους, Αθήνα: Εκδοτική Αθηνών, 1977, vol.12 (ΙΒ').
