= Hippocles of Cyme =

Hippocles of Cyme (in Greek: Ιπποκλής ο Κυμαίος) was an ancient Greek oecist from Cyme in Euboea.

As Strabo narrates, he, along with Megasthenes of Chalcis, undertook the task of creating a new colony. Both Hippocles and Megasthenes, after creating a small fleet and taking command of it, sailed around the Peloponnese and crossed the Ionian Sea. They reached Magna Graecia, and upon nearing its shores, they selected a site where they established the colony Cumae.
