= Nikos Tranos =

Greek artist

Nikos Tranos (Greek: Νίκος Τρανός; 1957) is a Greek sculptor and former rector of the Athens School of Fine Arts.

== Biography and career ==
Born in Zarakes, a village in the southern part of Euboea, Tranos entered the Athens School of Fine Arts in 1983, studying sculpture under George Nikolaidis. After his graduation in 1988, he continued his studies as a postgraduate student at ASFA, and also at Ecole des Beaux-Arts in Paris through Erasmus Program. He is a teacher of sculpture at ASFA since his appointment in 1995. He also served as rector of the institution from 2019 to 2023. Many of Tranos artworks are installations with a variety of media and materials while he is known for the diversity of his work including three-dimensional constructions, drawings, sculptures, photographies and videos. His work has been showcased in various solo and group exhibitions in museums and galleries in Greece and abroad (Belgium, France, Italy etc.). Many of his artworks acquired by Greek museums and galleries, including the National Gallery of Greece, the National Museum of Contemporary Art and the MOMus–Museum of Contemporary Art.

== Bibliography ==
- Κομίνη-Διαλέτη, Δώρα· Ματθιόπουλος, Ευγένιος Δ (1997). Λεξικό Ελλήνων Καλλιτεχνών:Ζωγράφοι, γλύπτες, χαράκτες, 16ος-20ός αιώνας. Καλλιτεχνική βιβλιοθήκη. 4. Athens: MELISSA Publishing House. pp. 306–7. ISBN 9789602042267.
