= Lichas =

Mythical character, servant of Heracles

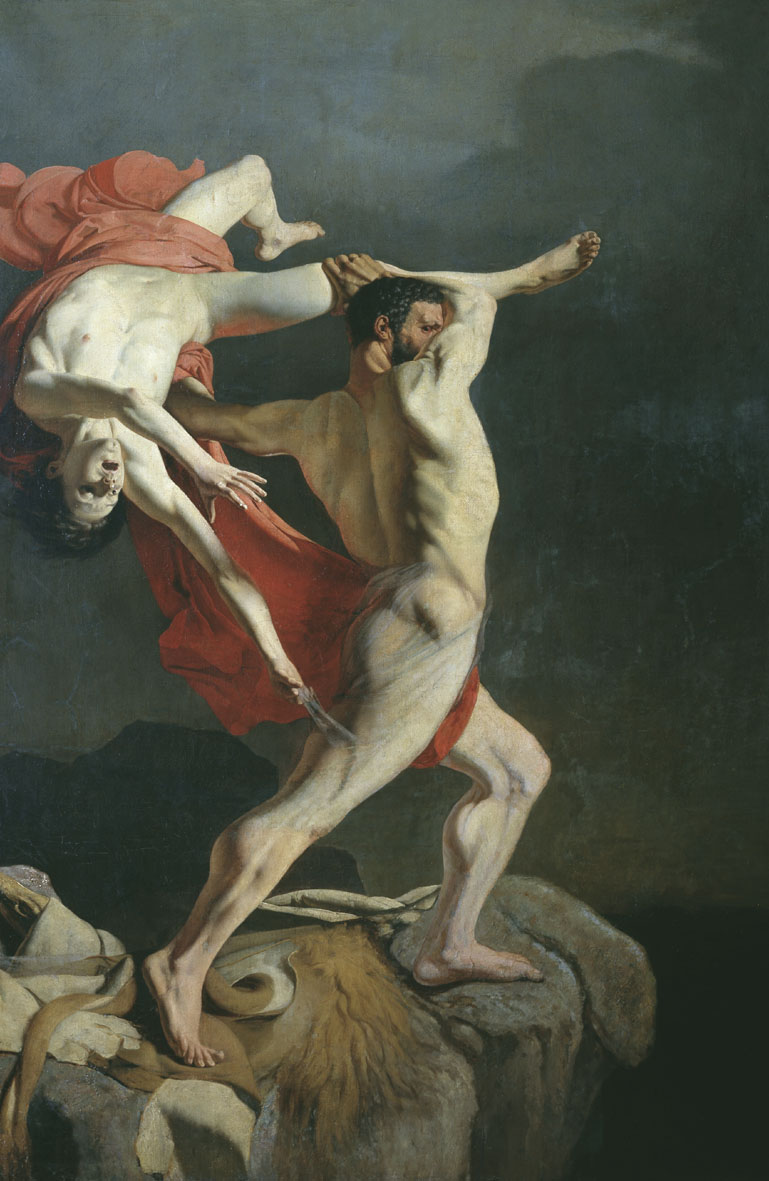
Hercules and Lichas (Pavel Sorokin, 1849).

In Greek mythology, Lichas (/ˈlaɪkəs/ LY-kəs; Ancient Greek: Λίχας) was Heracles' servant, who brought the poisoned shirt from Deianira to Hercules because of Deianira's jealousy of Iole, which killed him.

== Mythology ==
Lichas brought to his master the deadly garment, and as a punishment, was thrown by him into the sea, where the Lichadian islands, between Euboea and the coast of Locris, were believed to have derived their name from him. The story is recounted in Sophocles' Women of Trachis and Ovid's Metamorphoses.

=== Ovid's account ===
Cape Lichada is said to be where Hercules flung Lichas into the sea:

So, in his frenzy, as he wandered there,
he chanced upon the trembling Lichas, crouched
in the close covert of a hollow rock.
Then in a savage fury he cried out,
"Was it you, Lichas, brought this fatal gift?
Shall you be called the author of my death?"
Lichas, in terror, groveled at his feet,
and begged for mercy—"Only let me live!"
But seizing on him, the crazed Hero whirled
him thrice and once again about his head,
and hurled him, shot as by a catapult,
into the waves of the Euboic Sea.
Lichas was innocent but due to a big misunderstanding
Hercules threw in him the sea.

While he was hanging in the air, his form
was hardened; as, we know, rain drops may first
be frozen by the cold air, and then change
to snow, and as it falls through whirling winds
may press, so twisted, into round hailstones:
even so has ancient lore declared that when
strong arms hurled Lichas through the mountain air
through fear, his blood was curdled in his veins.
No moisture left in him, he was transformed
into a flint-rock. Even to this day,
a low crag rising from the waves is seen
out of the deep Euboean Sea, and holds
the certain outline of a human form,
so surely traced, the wary sailors fear
to tread upon it, thinking it has life,
and they have called it Lichas ever since.

—Ovid. Metamorphoses, IX:211

== Gallery ==
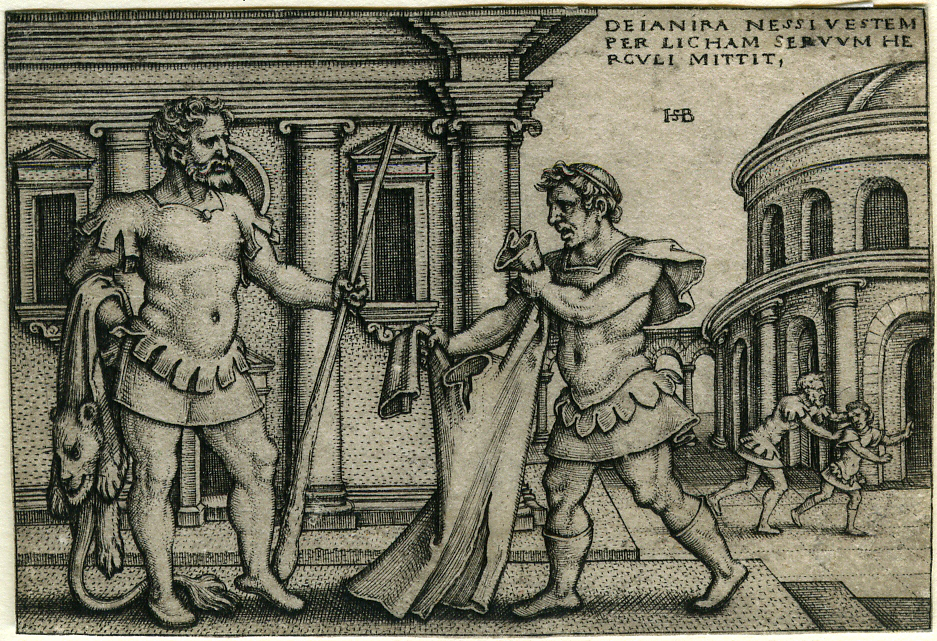
Lichas bringing the garment of Nessus to Hercules, engraving of Hans Sebald Beham for the "Labors of Hercules" (1542–1548)

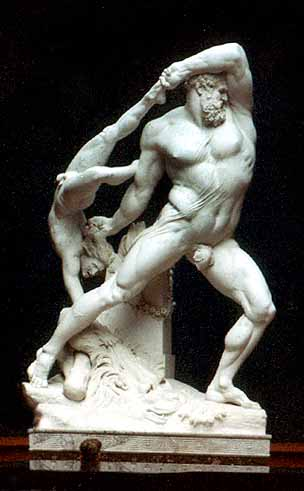
Hercules and Lichas (1795), by Antonio Canova

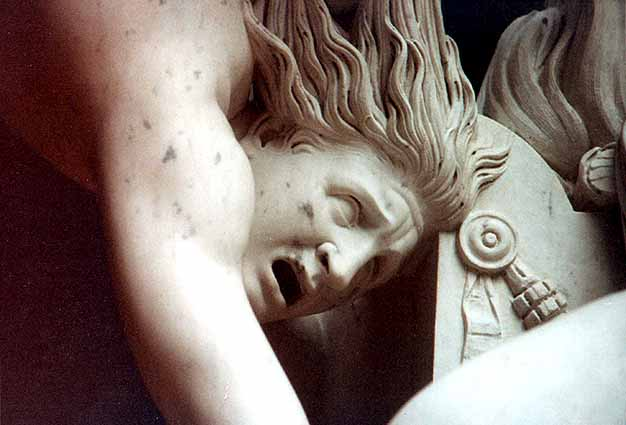
Detail from Hercules and Lichas (1795), by Antonio Canova
