= Kymi-Aliveri =

Kymi-Aliveri Κύμη-Αλιβέρι
- Municipality

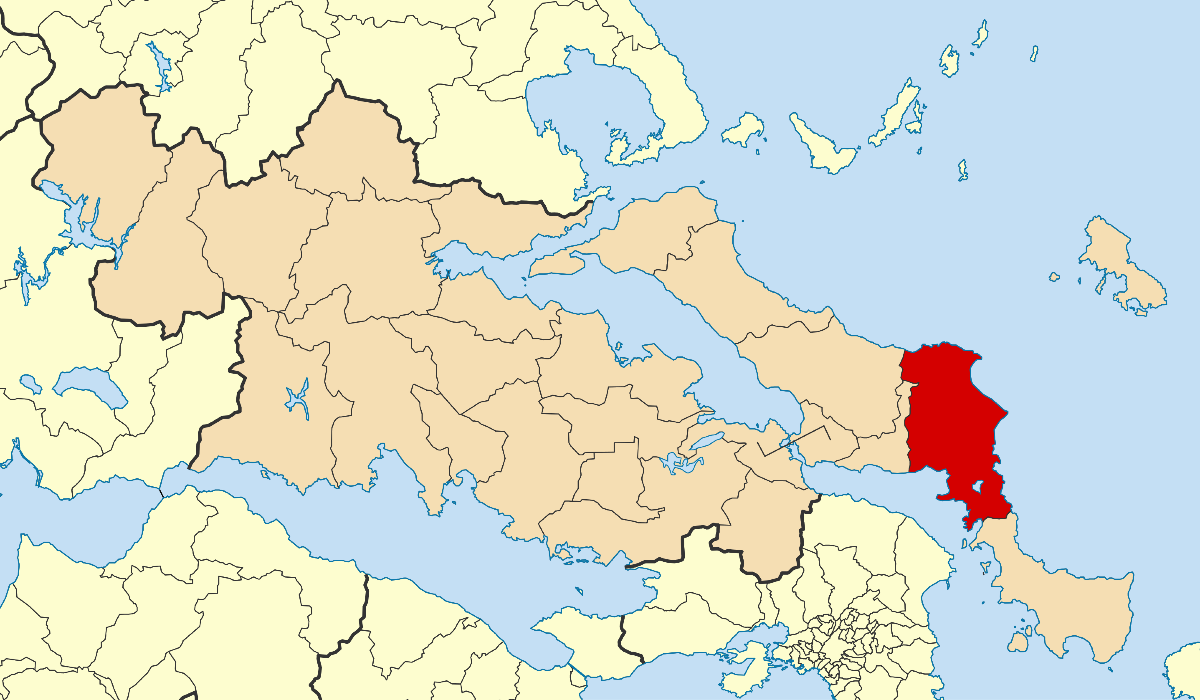

- Location within Greece
- Coordinates: 38°25′N 24°02′E
- Country: Greece
- Administrative region: Central Greece
- Regional unit: Euboea
- Seat: Aliveri

Government
  - Mayor: Nicholas Barakos (since 2023)

Area
  - Municipality: 804.98 km^{2} (310.80 sq mi)

Population (2021)
  - Municipality: 26,350
  - Density: 32.73/km^{2} (84.78/sq mi)
- Time zone: UTC+2 (EET)
  - Summer (DST): UTC+3 (EEST)

Kymi-Aliveri (Greek: Κύμη-Αλιβέρι) is a municipality in the Euboea regional unit, Central Greece, Greece. The seat of the municipality is the town Aliveri. The municipal unit has an area of 804.983 km^{2}.

== Municipality ==
The municipality Kymi-Aliveri was formed at the 2011 local government reform by the merger of the following 5 former municipalities, that became municipal units:

- Avlon
- Dystos
- Konistres
- Kymi
- Tamyneoi

== Mayors ==
- 2011 - 2014 Dimitrios Thomas (Δημήτριος Θωμάς)
- 2014 - 2023 Thanasis Bourandas (Θανάσης Μπουραντάς)
- 2023 - Nicholas Barakos (Νικόλαος Ι. Μπαράκος)
