= Stropones =

Stropones Στρόπωνες
- Community
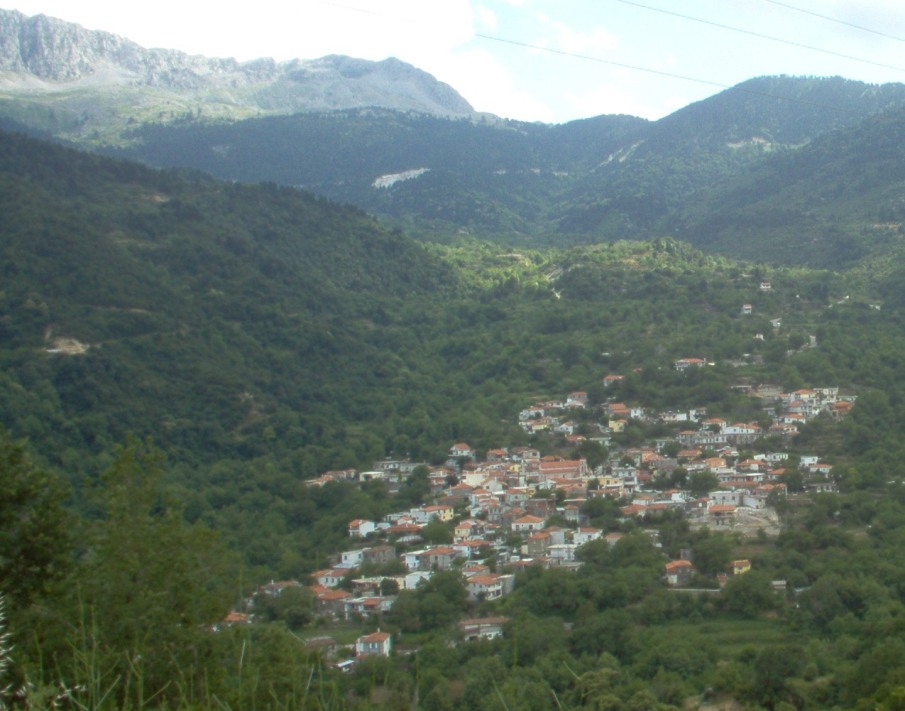
- General view of Stropones

- Location within Greece
- Coordinates: 38°37′N 23°53′E
- Country: Greece
- Administrative region: Central Greece
- Regional unit: Euboea
- Municipality: Dirfys-Messapia
- Municipal unit: Dirfys

Population (2021)
  - Community: 437
- Time zone: UTC+2 (EET)
  - Summer (DST): UTC+3 (EEST)
- Postal code: 340 14
- Area code: 22280
- Vehicle registration: ΧΑ

Stropones (Greek: Στρόπωνες) is a small village and a community in the island of Euboea in central Greece. This village of about 500 residents is located in central Euboea, 48 kilometres (30 mi) from Chalcis. The village is approximately 366 m (1,201 ft) above sea level. A popular beach, called Paralia Chiliadou, is located a few kilometres from Stropones.

The community consists of the villages Stropones, Paralia Chiliadou, Lamari and Agia Eirini.

== Historical population ==
Year	Population
1981	740
1991	539
2001	731
2011	625
2021	437

== See also ==
- List of settlements in the Euboea regional unit
