= Gulf of Euboea =

Arm of the Aegean Sea between Euboea and the Greek mainland

Coordinates: 38°33′N 23°30′E

The Gulf of Euboea, Euboean Gulf, Euboic Sea or Euboic Gulf (Greek: Ευβοϊκός Κόλπος, romanized: Evvoïkós Kólpos) is an arm of the Aegean Sea between the island of Euboea (northeast coastline) and the Greek mainland (southwest coastline). Trending diagonally northwest–southeast, the gulf is divided by the narrow Strait of Euripus, at the town of Chalcis. The North Euboean Gulf is about 80 kilometres (50 mi) long and up to 24 kilometres (15 mi) wide, and the South Euboean Gulf is about 48 kilometres (30 mi) long, with a maximum width of 14 kilometres (9 mi).

== North Euboean Gulf ==
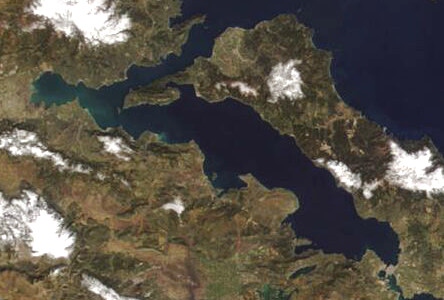
Satellite image (north up) of the North Euboean Gulf, with Euboea on top and the mainland below.

The North Euboean Gulf (Greek: Βόρειος Ευβοϊκός Κόλπος, Voreios Evvoïkos Kolpos) separates the northern part of the island Euboea from the mainland of Central Greece (Phthiotis and Boeotia). The narrow Euripus Strait, near Chalcis, connects the gulf to the south with the South Euboean Gulf. To the northwest, the gulf is connected with the Malian Gulf at Cape Cnemides. The overall length is about 68 km (42 mi). Its total area is 1,060 km^{2} (410 sq mi), and its maximum depth is 450 m (1,480 ft), in its central part. The Lichades islands lie at the northwestern end of the gulf, and Atalanti Island near the southwest coast.

The main city on the North Euboean Gulf is Chalcis, at its southeastern end. Other notable places on the gulf are Aidipsos, Limni and Nea Artaki on Euboea, and Agios Konstantinos, Livanates and Larymna on the Greek mainland.

== South Euboean Gulf ==
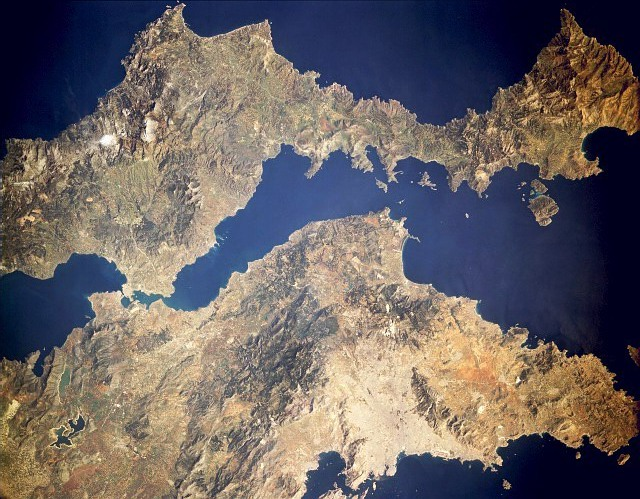
Satellite image (northeast up) of the South Euboean Gulf, with Euboea on top and the mainland below

The South Euboean Gulf (Greek: Νότιος Ευβοϊκός Κόλπος, Notios Evvoïkos Kolpos) separates the southern part of the island Euboea from the mainland of Central Greece (Boeotia and Attica). With a total length of approximately 40 km (25 mi), it stretches from the Euripus Strait in the northwest, which connects it to the North Euboean Gulf, to the Petalioi Gulf in the southeast. Its area in wide sense, including the Petalioi Gulf, is 900 km^{2} (350 sq mi). The islet Kavalliani lies in the southeastern entrance to the gulf.

The main city on the South Euboean Gulf is Chalcis, at its northwestern end. Other notable places on the gulf are Eretria, Amarynthos and Aliveri on Euboea, and Avlida, Dilesi, Nea Palatia and Agioi Apostoloi on the Greek mainland.
