= Paralia Koulouras =

Beach in Greece

Coordinates: 39.9372°N 22.7156°E

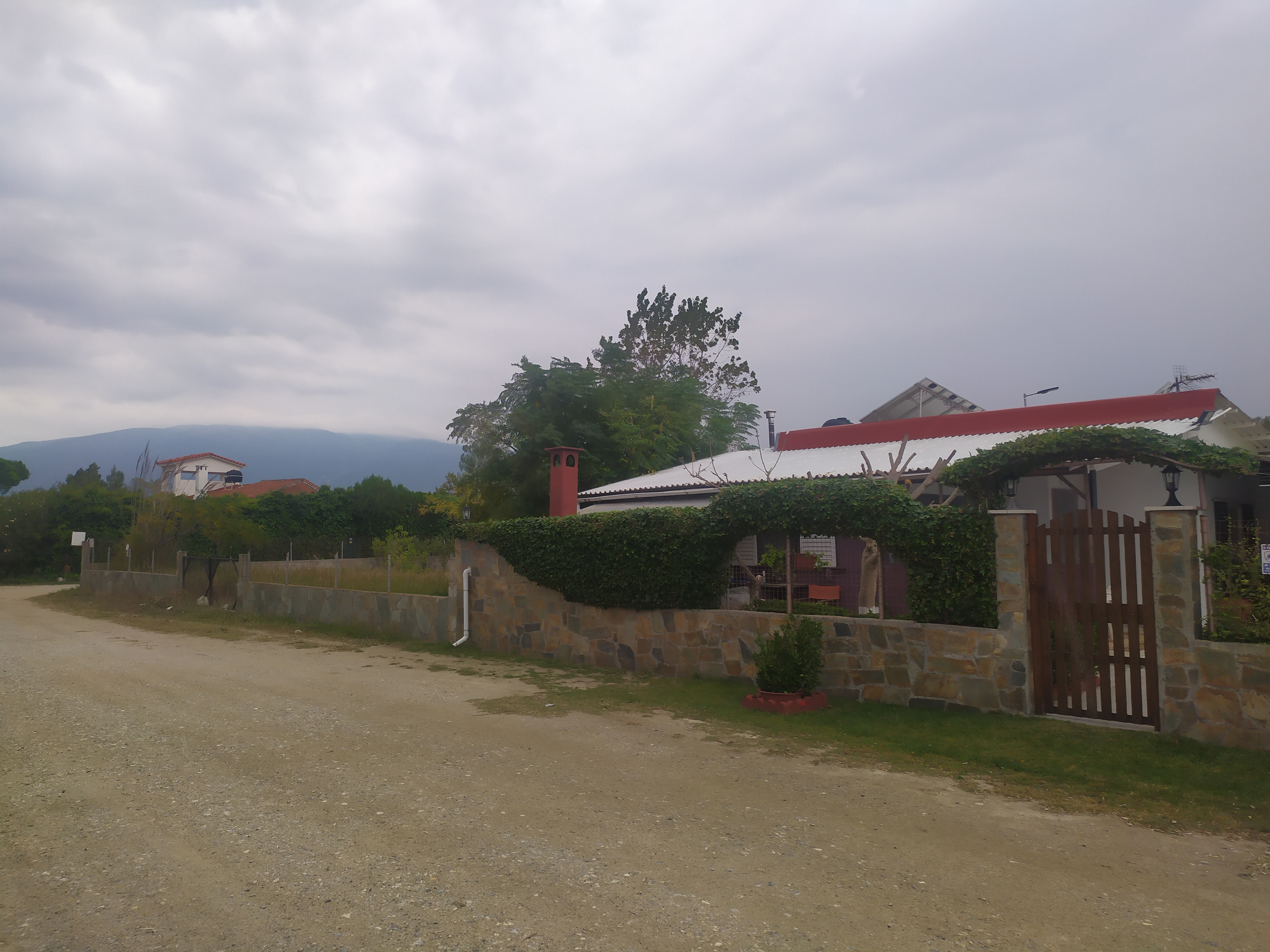
A house in Paralia Koulouras

Paralia Koulouras (Greek: Παραλία Κουλούρας) is a beach of Larissa regional unit in Greece.
