= Oikistes =

Ancient Greek leader of a colonization effort

The oikistes (Greek: οἰκιστής), often anglicized as oekist or oecist, was the individual chosen by an ancient Greek polis as the leader (archegetes) of any new colonization effort (apoikia), often to Italy or other areas of the Mediterranean. The mother city (metropolis) invested him with the power of selecting a settling place, directing the initial labors of the colonists (hetairoi), and guiding the fledgling colony through its hard early years.

An oracle (such as the Pythia) was ritually consulted during deliberations for choosing an oikistes, and after his appointment he was expected to consult one for divine guidance on the location of the new settlement. He was usually a well known nobleman in his home town, and was responsible for providing the ship on which the colonists set sail from the Greek mainland. Around 200 emigrants, who did not all have to come from the same city, were needed for a new foundation, mostly unmarried men able to bear arms. After arrival, the oikistes distributed the land, laid the street grid, and instituted the community's laws.

Due to his founding authority, the oikistes was often accorded his own cult after death, with sanctuaries, games, and festivals, and his name was preserved even when all other details of a founding were forgotten. Famous oikists:

- Archias for Syracuse, on the east coast of Sicily
- Antiphemus for Gela, on the south coast of Sicily
- Baatus for Cyrene, in the highlands of Jebel Akhdar in Libya
- Byzas for Byzantion, at the south-western exit of the Bosporus
- Epeios for Pisa and Metapont
- Euarchos for Catania, on the east coast of Sicily
- Hippocles of Cyme and Megasthenes of Chalcis for Cumae, north-west of Naples
- Makekon for Macedonia, region on the southern Balkan Peninsula
- Phalanthus for Taranto, on the Gulf of Taranto in the Ionian Sea
