= Dystos =

Dystos Δύστος
- Municipal unit
- Location within the regional unit

- Location within Greece
- Coordinates: 38°23′N 24°7′E
- Country: Greece
- Administrative region: Central Greece
- Regional unit: Euboea
- Municipality: Kymi-Aliveri

Area
  - Municipal unit: 162.431 km^{2} (62.715 sq mi)
- Elevation: 124 m (407 ft)

Population (2021)
  - Municipal unit: 4,247
  - Municipal unit density: 26.15/km^{2} (67.72/sq mi)
  - Community: 678
- Time zone: UTC+2 (EET)
  - Summer (DST): UTC+3 (EEST)
- Postal code: 340 17, 345 00
- Area code: 22230
- Vehicle registration: ΧΑ
- Website: www.distos.gr

Dystos (Greek: Δύστος [ˈðistos]; Latin: Dystus) is the name of a lake, village and former municipality in Euboea, Greece. Since the 2011 local government reform it is part of the municipality Kymi-Aliveri, of which it is a municipal unit. The municipal unit has an area of 162.431 km^{2}. The seat of the municipality was Krieza.

== History ==
The ancient town Dystus was mentioned by the 4th century BCE historian Theopompus. It is thought to have been founded by the Dryopians. The site of the ancient town is 38°21′19″N 24°08′43″E. During the 1950s, the power corporation of Greece established a steam power plant close to the lake Dystos at the city of Aliveri. That power plant used lake water for the cooling system.

== Historical population ==
Year	Community population	Municipal unit population
1981	662	-
1991	589	5,074
2001	699	5,080
2011	699	4,818
2021	678	4,247
