= Elymnioi =

Elymnioi Ελύμνιοι
- Municipal unit
- Location within the regional unit

- Location within Greece
- Coordinates: 38°46′N 23°19′E
- Country: Greece
- Administrative region: Central Greece
- Regional unit: Euboea
- Municipality: Mantoudi-Limni-Agia Anna

Area
  - Municipal unit: 161.1 km^{2} (62.2 sq mi)

Population (2021)
  - Municipal unit: 4,129
  - Municipal unit density: 25.63/km^{2} (66.38/sq mi)
- Time zone: UTC+2 (EET)
  - Summer (DST): UTC+3 (EEST)
- Vehicle registration: ΧΑ

Elymnioi (Greek: Ελύμνιοι) is a former municipality in Euboea, Greece. Since the 2011 local government reform it is part of the municipality Mantoudi-Limni-Agia Anna, of which it is a municipal unit. The municipal unit has an area of 161.102 km^{2}. Population 4,129 (2021). The seat of the municipality was in Limni.
