= Mantoudi-Limni-Agia Anna =

Mantoudi-Limni-Agia Anna Μαντούδι-Λίμνη-Αγία Άννα
- Municipality
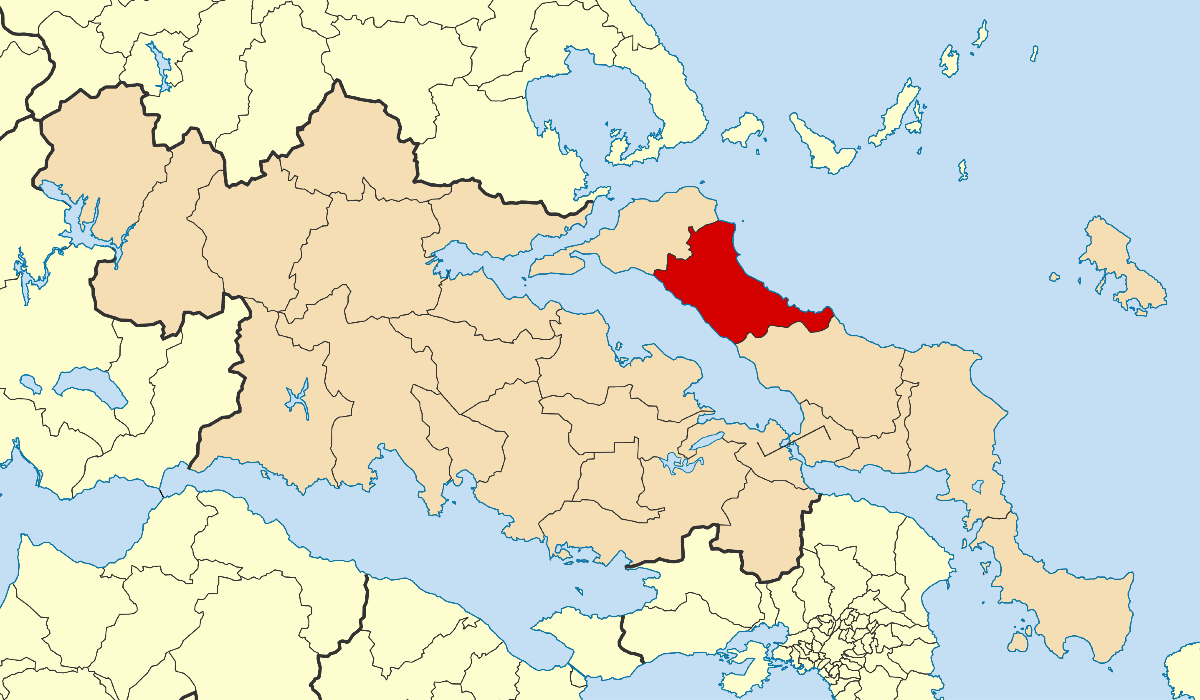

- Location within Greece
- Coordinates: 38°46′N 23°19′E
- Country: Greece
- Administrative region: Central Greece
- Regional unit: Euboea

Area
  - Municipality: 584.78 km^{2} (225.78 sq mi)

Population (2021)
  - Municipality: 12,235
  - Density: 20.922/km^{2} (54.189/sq mi)
- Time zone: UTC+2 (EET)
  - Summer (DST): UTC+3 (EEST)

Mantoudi-Limni-Agia Anna (Greek: Μαντούδι-Λίμνη-Αγία Άννα) is a municipality in the Euboea regional unit, Central Greece, Greece. The seat of the municipality is the town Limni. The municipality has an area of 584.784 km^{2}.

== Municipality ==
The municipality Mantoudi-Limni-Agia Anna was formed at the 2011 local government reform by the merger of the following 3 former municipalities, that became municipal units:

- Elymnioi
- Kireas
- Nileas
