= Konistres =

Konistres Κονίστρες
- Municipal unit
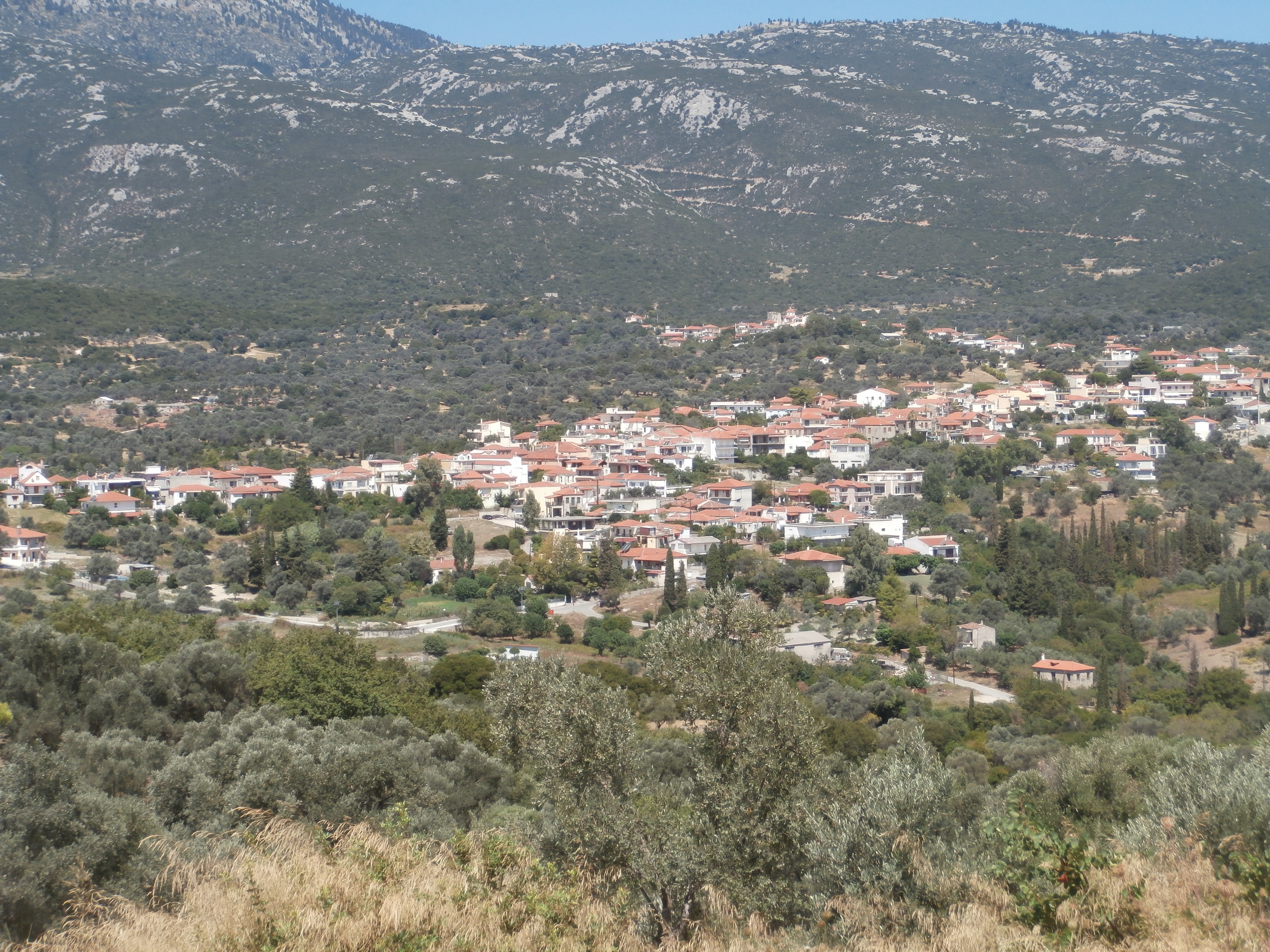

- Location within the regional unit

- Location within Greece
- Coordinates: 38°34′N 24°03′E
- Country: Greece
- Administrative region: Central Greece
- Regional unit: Euboea
- Municipality: Kymi-Aliveri

Area
  - Municipal unit: 127.6 km^{2} (49.3 sq mi)

Population (2021)
  - Municipal unit: 2,789
  - Municipal unit density: 21.86/km^{2} (56.61/sq mi)
  - Community: 722
- Time zone: UTC+2 (EET)
  - Summer (DST): UTC+3 (EEST)
- Vehicle registration: ΧΑ

Konistres (Greek: Κονίστρες) is a village and a former municipality in Euboea, Greece. Since a local government reform in 2011, it has been part of the municipality of Kymi-Aliveri, of which it is a municipal unit. The municipal unit has an area of 127.559 km^{2}. Population 2,789 (2021). Konistres emanates from the ancient word "Konistra". Konistra means palaistra (in Greek), which is a wrestling pitch.
