= Aliveri =

Aliveri Αλιβέρι
- Community
- Location within Greece
- Coordinates: 38°25′N 24°2′E
- Country: Greece
- Administrative region: Central Greece
- Regional unit: Euboea
- Municipality: Kymi-Aliveri
- Municipal unit: Tamyneoi

Population (2021)
  - Community: 5,386
- Time zone: UTC+2 (EET)
  - Summer (DST): UTC+3 (EEST)
- Vehicle registration: ΧΑ

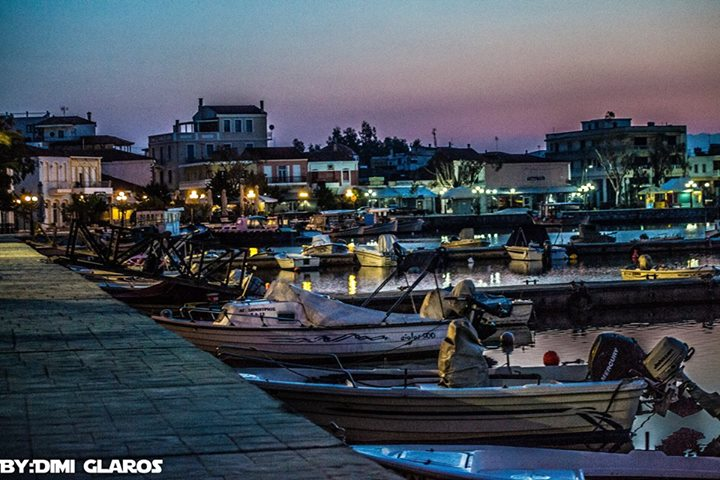
Port of Aliveri Evias, Karavos

Aliveri (Greek: Αλιβέρι) is a town and a community in the island of Evvoia, Greece. It is part of the municipal unit Tamyneoi, and the seat of the municipality Kymi-Aliveri. Aliveri is situated in the central part of the island, on the South Euboean Gulf. It is 13 km southwest of Avlonari, 14 km east of Amarynthos and 39 km east of Chalcis. The Greek National Road 44 (Thebes - Chalcis - Karystos) passes through the town. The community Aliveri consists of the town Aliveri and the villages Anthoupoli, Katakalos, Latas and Milaki.

Aliveri is mostly an industrial town. The biggest cement factory of Greece and a power generating plant of the Public Power Corporation (ΔΕΗ) are located in Aliveri. The lignite fired power plant began producing power in 1955. As the lignite seam has been exhausted now, the power plant is using oil. In the area, there is also marble mining industry. Aliveri has a picturesque harbor called "Karavos".

== Historical population ==
Year	Population town	Population community
1981	5,103	-
1991	5,065	-
2001	5,686	5,621
2011	4,827	5,249
2021	5,084	5,386

== Notable people ==
- Diamantis Chouchoumis (Greek: Διαμαντής Χουχούμης; born 17 July 1994) is a Greek footballer.

== See also ==
- List of settlements in the Euboea regional unit
