= Lichades =

Group of islands in Greece

Native name: Λιχάδες
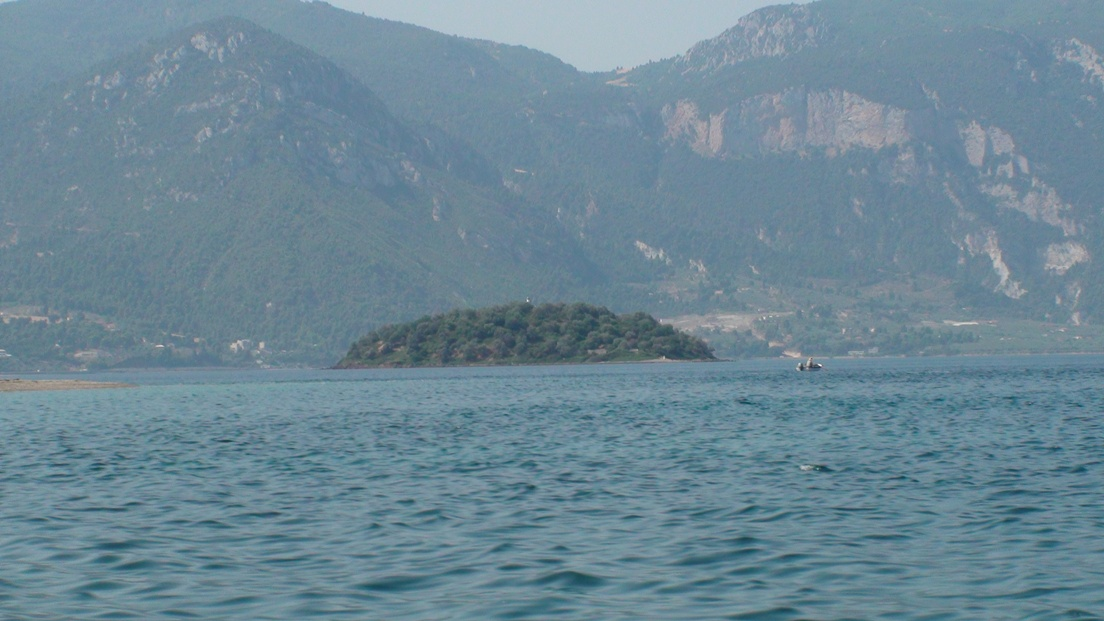
- Strongyli island of Lichades

- Location within Greece

Geography
- Coordinates: 38.8205°N 22.8177°E
- Total islands: 7

Administration
- Greece
- Region: Central Greece
- Regional unit: Euboea

Demographics
- Population: 0 (2011)

Lichades or Lichadonisia (Greek: Λιχάδες or Λιχαδονήσια) is an island complex off the north west of Euboea, in the North Euboean Gulf. The islands located opposite Lichada cape in the north-western extreme of Euboea and opposite of small town Kamena Vourla in Central Greece mainland. Administratively, they belong to Istiaia-Aidipsos municipality, in Euboea regional unit.

== Description ==
The complex consists of seven islands and islets. The biggest of them is Manolia and is the only that had residents in the past. The other six are Strongyli, Mikri Strongyli, Steno, Vagia, Vorias and Limani. The biggest island, Manolia has a beautiful beach and is visited by many tourists in the summer. In the past had a small settlement but nowadays is forsaken. Strongyli is the second largest island and on top has a big lighthouse.

== History ==
Lichades were formed after the huge earthquake of 426 B.C., when the land between them sank in the Euboean Sea. According to Greek mythology, their name comes from Lichas, the servant of Hercules who brought the poisoned shirt from Deianira to Hercules. Hercules hurled him to the sea and from his parts these small islands were formed.

The islands are one of the suggested locations for the Battle of the Echinades (322 BC), which ended Athenian thalassocracy.
