= Artemisio =

Village in Euboea, Greece

Artemisio Αρτεμίσιο
- Municipal unit
- Location within the regional unit

- Location within Greece
- Coordinates: 39°00′40″N 23°13′37″E
- Country: Greece
- Administrative region: Central Greece
- Regional unit: Euboea
- Municipality: Istiaia-Aidipsos

Area
  - Municipal unit: 122.6 km^{2} (47.3 sq mi)

Population (2021)
  - Municipal unit: 3,410
  - Municipal unit density: 27.8/km^{2} (72.0/sq mi)
  - Community: 871
- Time zone: UTC+2 (EET)
  - Summer (DST): UTC+3 (EEST)
- Vehicle registration: ΧΑ

Artemisio (Greek: Αρτεμίσιο) is a village and a former municipality in Euboea, in central Greece. Since the 2011 local government reform, it has been part of the municipality Istiaia-Aidipsos, of which it is a municipal unit. The municipal unit has an area of 122.640 km^{2}. The population was 3,410, as of 2021.
