= Mount Lichada =

Mountain in Euboea, Greece

Mount Lichada and Cape Lichada (Greek: Χερσόνησος Λιχάδα, romanized: Chersonesos Lichada) is a mountain and cape forming the northwest tip of the island of Euboea, Greece. Their ancient name was Κήναιον Kenaion, Latinized as Cenaeum. There is a village called Lichada on the slopes of Mount Lichada. Not far from the mount is the site of the ancient town of Dium.

Mount Lichada is 677 metres (2,221 ft) high.

On top of Mount Kenaion, there was an altar and sanctuary of Zeus Kenaios (Ζεύς Κήναιος). It was here, Sophocles tells us, that Heracles dedicated altars to Ζεύς Πατρῴος (Zeus Patroos), made sacrifices, and donned the Shirt of Nessus brought to him by Lichas. When he realized that it was a lethal gift, he flung Lichas into the sea.
