= Istiaia-Aidipsos =

Istiaia-Aidipsos Ιστιαία-Αιδηψός
- Municipality

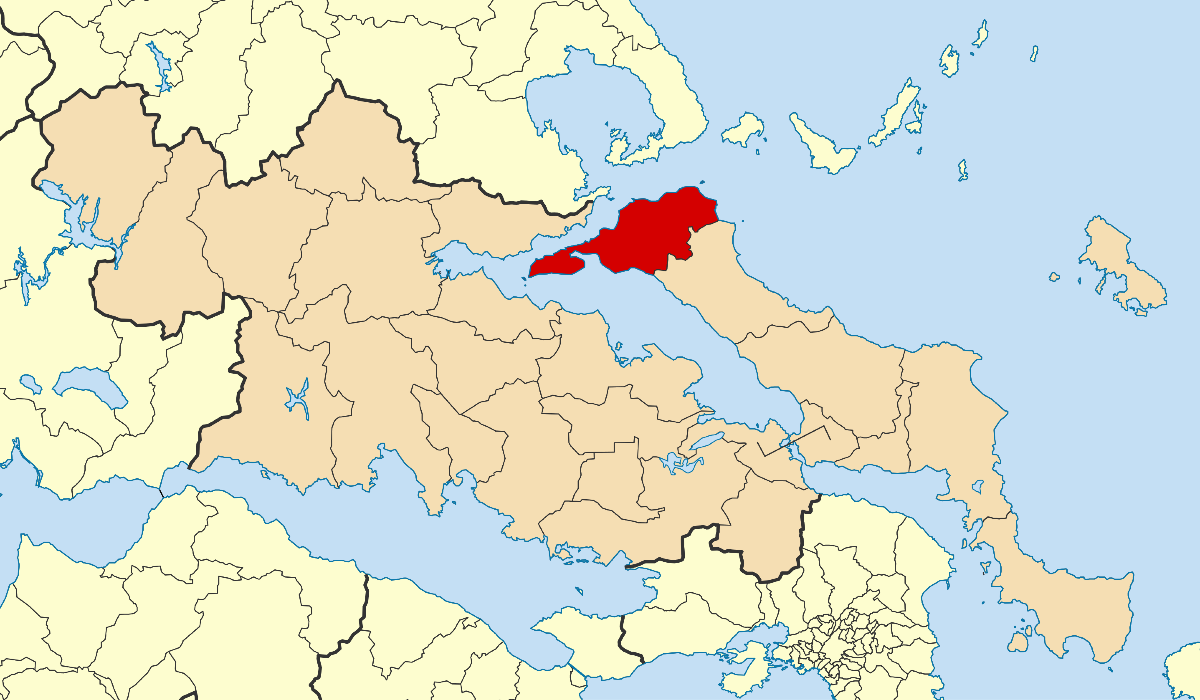

- Location within Greece
- Coordinates: 38°57′N 23°09′E
- Country: Greece
- Administrative region: Central Greece
- Regional unit: Euboea

Area
  - Municipality: 509.2 km^{2} (196.6 sq mi)

Population (2021)
  - Municipality: 19,396
  - Density: 38.09/km^{2} (98.66/sq mi)
- Time zone: UTC+2 (EET)
  - Summer (DST): UTC+3 (EEST)
- Website: www.dimosistiaiasaidipsou.net

Istiaia-Aidipsos (Greek: Ιστιαία-Αιδηψός) is a municipality in the Euboea regional unit, the Central region of Greece. The seat of the municipality is the town Istiaia. The municipality has an area of 509.204 km^{2}.

== Municipality ==
The municipality Istiaia-Aidipsos was formed at the 2011 local government reform by the merger of the following 5 former municipalities, that became municipal units:

- Aidipsos
- Artemisio
- Istiaia
- Lichada
- Oreoi

== Province ==
The province of Istiaia (Greek: Επαρχία Ιστιαίας) was one of the provinces of the Euboea Prefecture. It had the same territory as the present municipality Istiaia-Aidipsos. It was abolished in 2006.
