= Istiaia =

Town in Euboea, Greece

Istiaia Ιστιαία
- Municipal unit
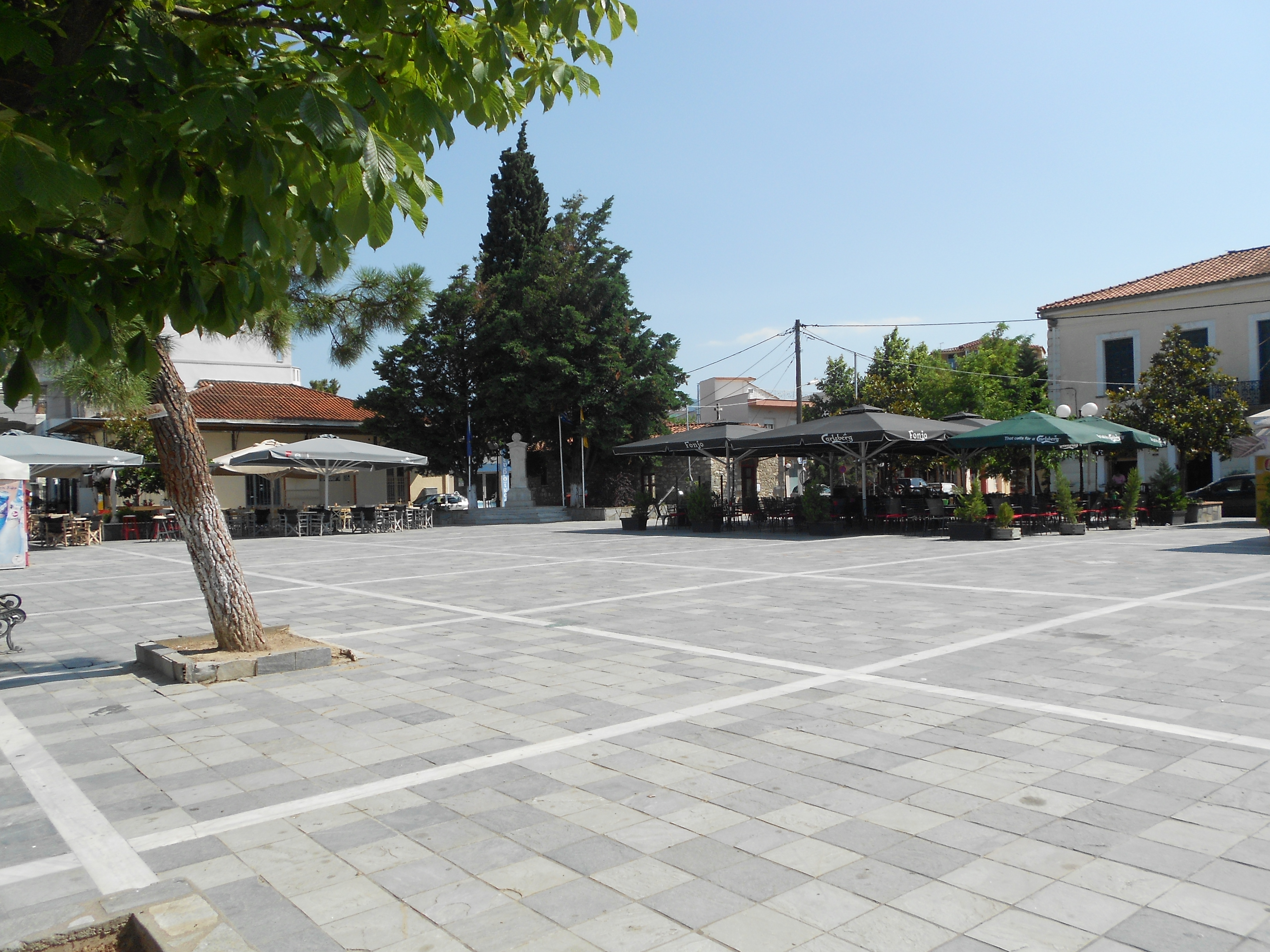
- Central square

- Location within the regional unit

- Location within Greece
- Coordinates: 38°57′N 23°09′E
- Country: Greece
- Administrative region: Central Greece
- Regional unit: Euboea
- Municipality: Istiaia-Aidipsos

Area
  - Municipal unit: 181.3 km^{2} (70.0 sq mi)

Population (2021)
  - Municipal unit: 6,457
  - Municipal unit density: 35.62/km^{2} (92.24/sq mi)
  - Community: 5,107
- Time zone: UTC+2 (EET)
  - Summer (DST): UTC+3 (EEST)
- Vehicle registration: ΧΑ

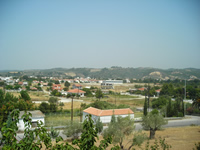
View from Dexameni Hill

Istiaia (Greek: Ιστιαία, pronounced [istiˈe.a], before 1913: Ξηροχώρι - Xirochori) is a town and a former municipality in Euboea, Greece. It was named after the ancient town Histiaea, which was mentioned by the ancient Greek poet Homer. Since the 2011 local government reform, it has been part of the municipality Istiaia-Aidipsos, of which it is the seat and a municipal unit. The municipal unit has an area of 181.299 km^{2}.

The town is located in the northwestern end of the island Euboea, 5 km from the north coast, and north of the mountain Telethrio. It was the capital of Istiaia Province until the province was abolished in 2006. Visitor attractions of Istiaia include the Museum of Natural History and the church of Agios Nikolaos.

== Subdivisions ==
The municipal unit Istiaia is subdivided into the following communities (constituent villages and population at the 2011 census given in brackets):

- Avgaria (pop. 96)
- Galatsades (Galatsades, Kamatriades, pop. 148)
- Galatsona (pop. 65)
- Istiaia (Agios Georgios, Istiaia, Kanatadika, Nea Sinasos, Neochori, pop. 5,522)
- Kamaria (pop. 381)
- Kokkinomilea (pop. 72)
- Kryoneritis (pop. 189)
- Milies (pop. 169)
- Monokarya (Kato Monokarya, Monokarya, pop. 155)
- Voutas (Voutas, Kyparissi, Simia, pop. 294)

== Population history ==
Year	Population community	Population municipal unit
1991	3,966	-
2001	5,343	7,353
2011	5,522	7,091
2021	5,107	6,457

== History ==
Istiaia was named after the ancient town of Histiaea, already mentioned by Homer in his Iliad. The old town was situated 2 km west of the present town. Archaeological findings from 2000 BC have been done, suggesting a settlement existed here in the Middle Helladic period.

Near the ancient town, a new town was founded, named Xirochori. Its name was changed into Istiaia in 1913, after the ancient town Histiaea.
