= Aidipsos =

Village in Euboea, Greece

Aidipsos Αιδηψός
- Municipal unit
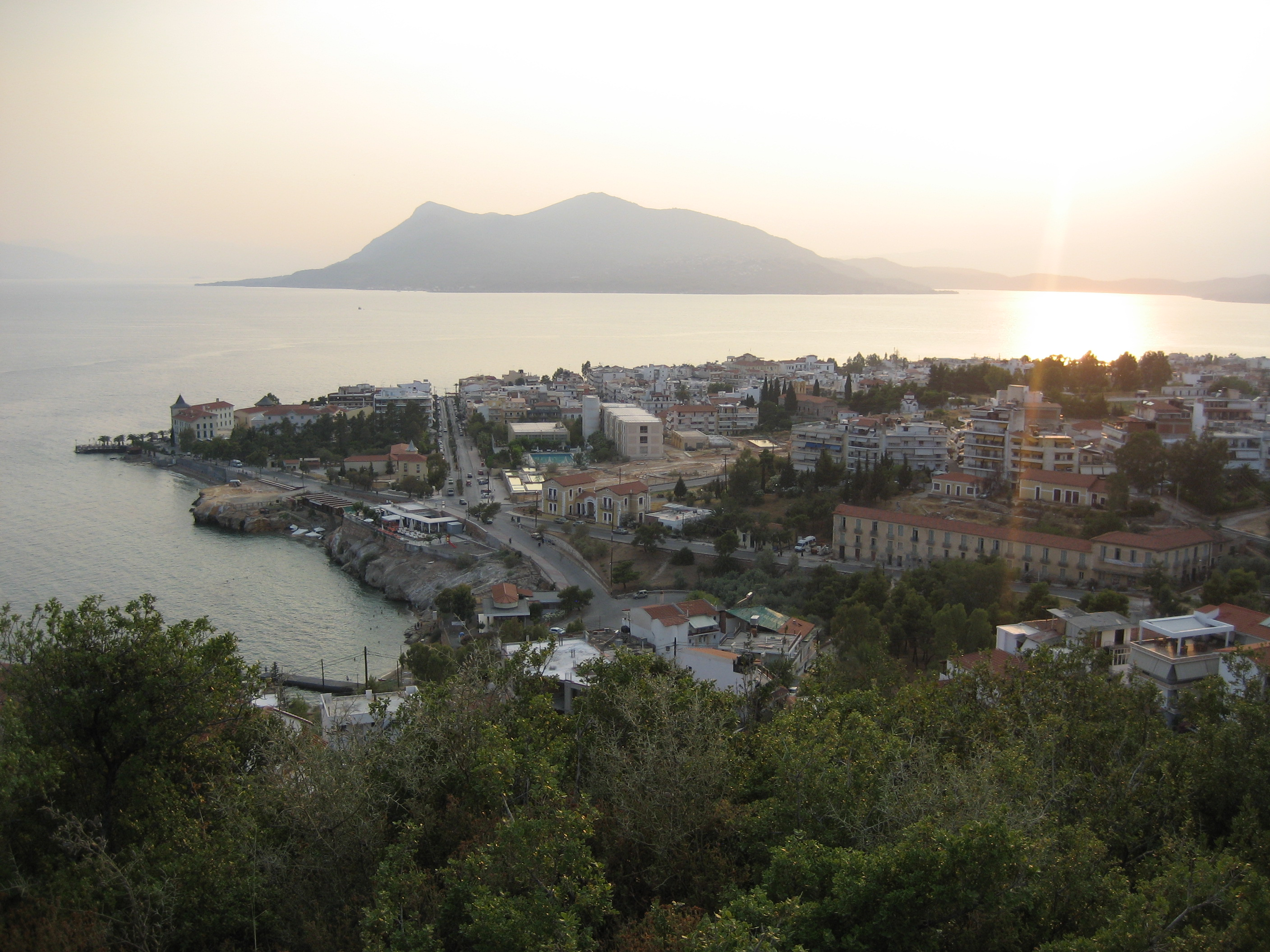

- Location within the regional unit

- Location within Greece
- Coordinates: 38°52′N 23°03′E
- Country: Greece
- Administrative region: Central Greece
- Regional unit: Euboea
- Municipality: Istiaia-Aidipsos

Area
  - Municipal unit: 115.461 km^{2} (44.580 sq mi)

Population (2021)
  - Municipal unit: 5,766
  - Municipal unit density: 49.94/km^{2} (129.3/sq mi)
- Time zone: UTC+2 (EET)
  - Summer (DST): UTC+3 (EEST)
- Postal code: 34300
- Area code: 22260
- Vehicle registration: XA

Aidipsos (Greek: Αιδηψός, Greek pronunciation: [eðiˈpsos]) is a village and a former municipality in Euboea, Greece. The municipality Aidipsos was founded in 1997 by the merger of the municipality Loutra Aidipsou with the communities Agios and Gialtra. Since the 2011 local government reform it is part of the municipality Istiaia-Aidipsos, of which it is a municipal unit. The municipal unit has an area of 115.461 km^{2}. 80 of Greece's 752 hot springs are located in Aidipsos, making it a popular tourist destination. The spas date back more than 20,000 years. Many famous personalities have visited the town, such as Lucius Cornelius Sulla, Sir Winston Churchill, Eleutherios Venizelos, Theodoros Deligiannis, Georgios Theotokis, Ioannis Kondilakis, Archbishop of Athens Theocletus I, Aristotelis Onassis, Maria Callas, Kostis Palamas, Marika Kotopouli and others. Within the modern borders of the municipal units are the remains of ancient town of Aedepsus.

Historical population
Year	Pop.	±%
2001	6,482	—
2011	6,141	−5.3%
2021	5,766	−6.1%
