= Euboea (regional unit) =

Euboea Περιφερειακή ενότητα Εύβοιας
- Regional unit
- Municipalities of Euboea

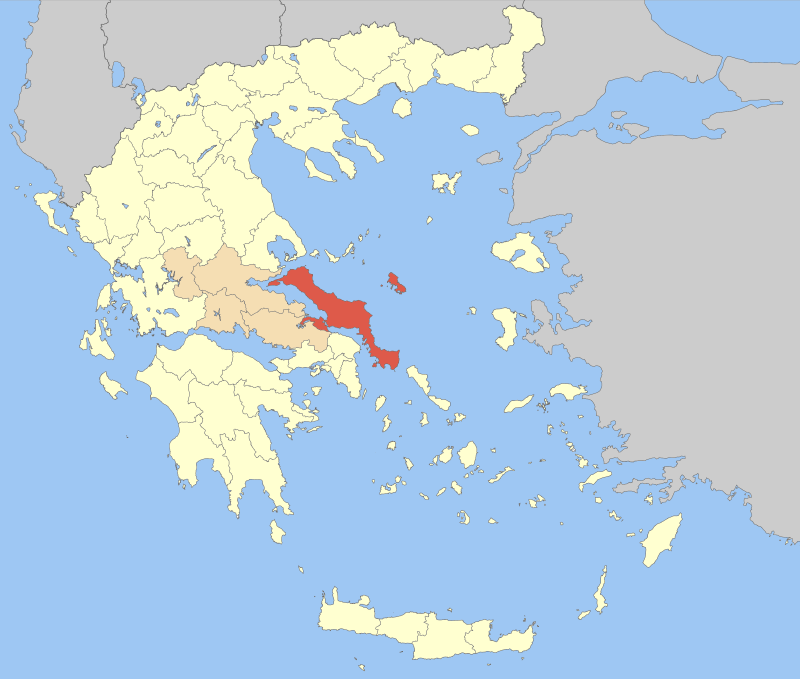
- Euboea within Greece

- Location within Greece
- Coordinates: 38°30′N 24°0′E
- Country: Greece
- Administrative region: Central Greece
- Seat: Chalcis

Area
  - Total: 4,167 km^{2} (1,609 sq mi)

Population (2021)
  - Total: 210,778
  - Density: 50.58/km^{2} (131.0/sq mi)
- Time zone: UTC+2 (EET)
  - Summer (DST): UTC+3 (EEST)
- Postal code: 34x xx
- Area code: 222x0
- Vehicle registration: ΧΑ
- Website: www.naevias.gr

Euboea (Greek: Περιφερειακή ενότητα Εύβοιας) is one of the regional units of Greece. It is part of the administrative region of Central Greece. It consists of the islands of Euboea and Skyros, as well as a 260 km^{2} area on the Greek mainland. Its land area is 4,167.449 km^{2}, whereas the total land area of the municipalities actually on the island Euboea is 3,684.848 km^{2}, which includes that of numerous small offshore islets (Petalies Islands) near Euboea's southern tip.

== Administration ==
The Euboea regional unit is subdivided into 8 municipalities, numbered in the picture in the infobox. These are:

- Chalcis (Chalkida, 1)
- Dirfys-Messapia (2)
- Eretria (3)
- Istiaia-Aidipsos (4)
- Karystos (5)
- Kymi-Aliveri (6)
- Mantoudi-Limni-Agia Anna (7)
- Skyros (8)

=== Prefecture ===
As a part of the 2011 Kallikratis government reform, the former Euboea Prefecture (Greek: Νομός Εύβοιας) was transformed into a regional unit within the Central Greece region, without any change in boundaries. At the same time, the municipalities were reorganised, according to the table below.

New municipality	Old municipalities	Seat
Chalcis (Chalkida)	Chalcis	Chalcis
Chalcis (Chalkida)	Lilantia	Chalcis
Chalcis (Chalkida)	Nea Artaki	Chalcis
Chalcis (Chalkida)	Anthidona	Chalcis
Chalcis (Chalkida)	Avlida	Chalcis
Dirfys-Messapia	Dirfys	Psachna
Dirfys-Messapia	Messapia	Psachna
Eretria	Eretria	Eretria
Eretria	Amarynthos	Eretria
Istiaia-Aidipsos	Aidipsos	Istiaia
Istiaia-Aidipsos	Artemisio	Istiaia
Istiaia-Aidipsos	Istiaia	Istiaia
Istiaia-Aidipsos	Lichada	Istiaia
Istiaia-Aidipsos	Oreoi	Istiaia
Karystos	Karystos	Karystos
Karystos	Kafireas	Karystos
Karystos	Marmari	Karystos
Karystos	Styra	Karystos
Kymi-Aliveri	Kymi	Aliveri
Kymi-Aliveri	Avlon	Aliveri
Kymi-Aliveri	Dystos	Aliveri
Kymi-Aliveri	Konistres	Aliveri
Kymi-Aliveri	Tamyneoi	Aliveri
Mantoudi-Limni-Agia Anna	Elymnioi	Mantoudi
Mantoudi-Limni-Agia Anna	Kireas	Mantoudi
Mantoudi-Limni-Agia Anna	Nileas	Mantoudi
Skyros	Skyros	Skyros

Note: the former municipalities of Anthidona and Avlida are on the mainland, attached to the northeastern part of Boeotia. Skyros is an island by itself.

=== Provinces ===
- Chalkida Province - Chalkida
- Istiaeotis Province - Istiaia
- Karystiaea Province - Karystos

Note: Provinces no longer hold any legal status in Greece.

== Population ==
Historical population
Year	Pop.	±%
1991	202,131	—
2001	207,305	+2.6%
2011	210,815	+1.7%
2021	210,778	−0.0%
