= Aulon =

Aulon may refer to:

== Places ==
=== Greece ===
- Aulon (Arcadia), a settlement in ancient Arcadia
- Aulon (Attica), a settlement in ancient Attica
- Aulon (Crete), a settlement in ancient Crete
- Aulon (Messenia), a settlement in ancient Messenia
- Aulon (Naxos), a settlement in ancient Naxos
- Avlonari, a city formerly known as Aulon, on Euboea

=== Albania ===
- The Greek name of the city of Vlorë

=== France ===
- Aulon, Creuse, a commune of the Creuse département
- Aulon, Haute-Garonne, a commune of the Haute-Garonne département
- Aulon, Hautes-Pyrénées, a commune of the Hautes-Pyrénées département

== Religious jurisdictions ==
- the former Diocese of Aulon (Hellas) with the above see, now a Latin Catholic titular see as Aulon (Aulonensis)
- the former Diocese of Aulon (Epirus) with the above see, now a Latin Catholic titular see as Aulon (Aulonitanus)
