= List of castles in Greece =

This is a list of castles, fortresses and towers in Greece.

== Castles/Fortresses ==
Castles and fortresses in Greece
Name	Location	Era	Image
Acrocorinth	Corinth	Ancient/Byzantine period	
Acronauplia	Nafplion	Ancient/Byzantine/Frankish/Venetian period	
Agios Georgios Castle	Cephalonia	Byzantine/Venetian period	
Agios Andreas Castle	Preveza	Ottoman/Venetian period	
Agios Georgios Castle	Preveza	Ottoman period	
Amfissa Castle	Amfissa	Ancient/Byzantine/Frankish period	
Angelokastro (Corfu)	Corfu	Byzantine/Venetian periods	
Anthousa Castle	Anthousa, Preveza (regional unit)	Ottoman period	
Anthimachia Castle	Kos	Byzantine period	
Aptera Fortress	Chania	Ottoman period	
Araklovon Castle	Minthi, Elis	Byzantine period	
Arkessini Castle	Acropolis of Arkessini, Amorgos	Ancient period	
Arta Castle	Arta	Byzantine period	
Asini Castle	Asini, Argolis	Ancient period	
Assos Castle	Assos, Cephalonia	Venetian period	
Arkadia Castle	Kyparissia	Frankish period	
Astypalaia Castle	Astypalaia	Frankish/Venetian period	
Castle of Bouka	Preveza	Ottoman & Venetian periods	
Bourtzi	Nafplio	Venetian period	
Bourtzi (Karystos)	Karystos	Venetian period	
Castle of Chalkis (Karababa)	Chalkis	Ottoman period	
Castle of Chios	Chios	Genoese period	
Castle of Mytilene	Mytilene	Ancient/Byzantine/Genoese period	
Chlemoutsi	northwestern Elis	Frankish period	
Castle of Cuppa	Avlonari	Frankish/Venetian period	
Cythera Castle	Cythera (island)	Venetian period	
Didymoteicho Fortress	Didymoteicho	Ancient/Byzantine period	
Elea Castle	Elea, Thesprotia	Ancient period	
Eleutherae	Attica	Ancient period	
Esphigmenou Monastery-fortress	Mount Athos	Byzantine period	
Exomvourgo Fortress	Exomvourgo, Tinos	Venetian period	
Firkas Fortress (Revellino)	Chania	Ottoman period	
Fortezza of Rethymno	Rethymno, Crete	Venetian period	
Fortifications of Chania	Chania	Venetian period	
Fortifications of Heraklion	Heraklion	Venetian period	
Fotodotis monastery-fortress	Naxos	Byzantine period	
Frangokastello	South Crete	Venetian period	
Fyli Castle	Fyli	Ancient period	
Gardiki Castle	southwestern Corfu	Byzantine/Venetian period	
Geraki Castle	Laconia	Frankish period	
Glarentza Castle	northwestern Elis	Frankish period	
Goulas Castle	Akrotiri (prehistoric city)	Venetian period	
Gramvousa Castle	Gramvousa	Venetian period	
Heptapyrgion	Thessaloniki	Byzantine/Ottoman period	
Kales Castle	Ierapetra, Crete	Venetian period	
Ioannina Castle	Ioannina	Byzantine/Ottoman period	
Itzedin Fortress	Souda Bay	Ottoman period	
Kalamata Castle	Kalamata, Messenia	Byzantine/Venetian/Ottoman period	
Kalymnos Castle	Kalymnos	Byzantine period	
Karytaina Castle	Karytaina	Frankish period	
Kassiopi Castle	Kassiopi, Corfu	Byzantine/Venetian period	
Kastelli of Emporio	Emporio, Santorini	Venetian period	
Kastelli of Pyrgos	Pyrgos Kallistis, Santorini	Venetian period	
Kastellos (Kritinia)	Kritinia, Rhodes	Hospitaller period	
Kavala Castle	Kavala	Byzantine period	
Kazarma fortress	Sitia	Venetian period	
Koroni Castle	Koroni	Venetian/Ottoman period	
Koules Fortress (Rocca al Mare)	Heraklion	Venetian period	
Lamia Castle	Lamia (city)	Byzantine period	
Larissa Castle	Larissa, Argos	Ancient/Byzantine period	
Laskara Castle	Preveza	Late Ottoman period	
Leros Castle	Leros	Hospitaller period	
Lindos Castle	Acropolis of Lindos	Ancient/Byzantine/Hospitaller period	
Mesta fortified town	Chios	Byzantine period	
Methoni Castle	Methoni	Venetian/Ottoman period	
Mithymna Castle	Mithymna, Lesbos	Byzantine period	
Monastery of Saint John the Theologian	Patmos	Byzantine period	
Monemvasia Fortress	Monemvasia	Byzantine/Venetian period	
Moni Arkadiou	Arkadi, Crete	Venetian period	
Moni Toplou	Lasithi, Crete	Venetian/Ottoman period	
Monolithos Castle	Monolithos, Rhodes	Hospitaller period	
Myrina Fortress	Myrina, Lemnos	Byzantine period	
Mystras Palace	Mystras	Byzantine period	
Nafpaktos Castle	Nafpaktos	Venetian period	
Naxos Castle	Naxos	Venetian period	
Nerantzia Castle	Kos	Knights period	
New Fortress, Corfu	Corfu (city)	Venetian period	
New Navarino fortress	Pylos	Ottoman period	
Old Fortress, Corfu	Corfu (city)	Venetian period	
Old Navarino castle	Near Pylos	Frankish period	
Orchomenus (Boeotia) Castle	Orchomenus (Boeotia)	Ancient period	
Palace of the Grand Master of the Knights of Rhodes	Rhodes (city)	Hospitaller/Ottoman/Italian period	
Palaiokastro	Mandraki, Nisyros	Hellenistic period	
Palamidi	Nafplion	Venetian period	
Pantokrator Castle	Preveza	Ottoman period	
Parga Castle	Parga	Venetian/Ottoman period	
Patras Castle	Patras	Byzantine period	
Pente Pigadia Fort	Kleisoura	Ottoman period	
Platamon Castle	Platamon	Frankish period	
Pleuron Castle	Pleuron, Aetolia	Ancient period	
Potiri Castle	Avlonari	Frankish/Venetian period	
Fortifications of Rhodes	Rhodes (city)	Byzantine/Hospitaller/Ottoman/Italian period	
Riniasa Castle / Thomokastro	Riza, Preveza	Byzantine period	
Rio Castle	Rio	Ottoman/Venetian period	
Rogoi/Bouchetion	Nea Kerasounta, Preveza	Ancient/Byzantine period	
Saint John Castle	Archangelos, Rhodes	Hospitaller period	
Santa Maura Castle	Lefkada	Venetian period	
Servia castle	Kozani (regional unit)	Byzantine period	
Simonopetra monastery-fortress	Mount Athos	Byzantine period	
Skiathos Castle	Skiathos	Byzantine period	
Spinalonga Castle	Spinalonga	Ancient/Venetian period	
Stavronikita monastery-fortress	Mount Athos	Byzantine period	
Tiryns Castle	Acropolis of Tiryns	Ancient (Mycenaean) period	
Toroivia Castle	Komboti, Aetolia-Acarnania	Ancient period	
Trikala Castle	Trikala	Byzantine period	
Vonitsa Castle	Vonitsa	Byzantine/Ottoman/Venetian period	
Voukation Castle	Paravola (near Agrinion)	Ancient period	
Vrysoula Bastion	Preveza	Venetian/Ottoman period	
Walls of Thessaloniki	Thessaloniki	Byzantine period	
Xenophontos monastery-fortress	Mount Athos	Byzantine period	

== Towers ==
Towers in Greece
Name	Location	Era	Image
Aigosthena Tower	Aigosthena, Attica	Ancient period	
Agia Tower	Naxos	Venetian period	
Annunziata Tower	Corfu (city)	Venetian period	
Avlonari Tower	Avlonari, Euboea	Venetian period	
Belonia Tower	Naxos	Venetian period	
Crispi Tower	Naxos	Venetian period	
Fokea Tower	Fokea, Chalkidiki	Byzantine period	
Gratsia Tower	Naxos	Venetian period	
Markellos Tower	Aegina	Venetian period	
Maroulas Towers	Maroulas, Crete	Venetian period	
Ouranoupolis Tower	Ouranoupolis, Chalkidiki	Byzantine period	
Sanudo Tower	Naxos	Venetian period	
Vasiliko Tower	Euboea	Venetian period	
White Tower of Thessaloniki	Thessaloniki	Ottoman period	

== Bibliography ==
- Forbes-Boyd, Eric "In Crusader Greece: A Tour of the Castles of the Morea", 1964
- Eustasiades, "Fortresses and Castles of Greece: Eastern central Greece: Attica, Boeotia, Phthiotis, Phocis; Thessaly; Macedonia; Thrace", 1972
- Hetherington, Paul "Byzantine and Medieval Greece: Churches, Castles, and Art of the Mainland and the Peloponnese", 1991
- Paradissis, Alexander "Fortresses and Castles of Greece: Southern and West Central Greece", 1996
- Andrews, Kevin "Castles of the Morea", 2006
- Brooks, Allan "Castles of Northwest Greece", 2013
- Nicolle, David "Crusader Castles in Cyprus, Greece and the Aegean 1191–1571", 2013

== See also ==
- List of castles
- List of castles in Cyprus
- List of gates in Greece
