= Cazeneuve =

Cazeneuve may refer to:

== People ==
- André Cazeneuve (died 1874), French soldier in Japanese service
- Bernard Cazeneuve (born 1963), French politician
- Jean Cazeneuve (1915–2005), French sociologist and anthropologist
- Louis Cazeneuve (1908–1977), Argentine-American comic-book artist
- Marguerite Cazeneuve (born 1988), French political adviser
- Paul Cazeneuve (1852–1934), French politician
- Pierre Cazeneuve (born 1995), French politician

== Places ==
- Allez-et-Cazeneuve, a commune in the Lot-et-Garonne department in southwestern France
- Cazeneuve-Montaut, a commune in the Haute-Garonne department in southwestern France
- Cazeneuve, Gers, a commune in the Gers department in southwestern France
- Château de Cazeneuve, a château in France

== Other ==
- Cazeneuve (company), French machine tool manufacturing company
- Cazeneuve Government, the thirty-ninth Government of France, led by Prime Minister Bernard Cazeneuve

== See also ==
- Cazenave (disambiguation)
