= Saint-Élix-Séglan =

- Commune
- Location of Saint-Élix-Séglan
- Location within France Location within Occitanie
- Coordinates: 43°11′47″N 0°51′18″E
- Country: France
- Region: Occitania
- Department: Haute-Garonne
- Arrondissement: Saint-Gaudens
- Canton: Cazères
- Intercommunality: Cœur et Coteaux du Comminges

Government
  - Mayor (2020–2026): Nicolas Suspene
- Area^{1}: 2.86 km^{2} (1.10 sq mi)
- Elevation: 327 m (1,073 ft)
- Highest elevation: 401 m (1,316 ft)
- Lowest elevation: 313 m (1,027 ft)
- Population (2023): 51
  - Density: 18/km^{2} (46/sq mi)
- Time zone: UTC+01:00 (CET)
  - Summer (DST): UTC+02:00 (CEST)
- INSEE/Postal code: 31477 /31420
- ^{1} French Land Register data, which excludes lakes, ponds, glaciers > 1 km^{2} (0.386 sq mi or 247 acres) and river estuaries.

Saint-Élix-Séglan is a small rural village and commune in the Haute-Garonne department in southwestern France. It is best known for the castle which dominates the village.

== Geography ==
The commune is bordered by four other communes: Peyrouzet to the northwest, Aulon to the southwest, Cazeneuve-Montaut to the southeast, and finally by Aurignac to the northeast.

== Population ==
Historical population
Year	Pop.	±% p.a.
1968	91	—
1975	69	−3.88%
1982	68	−0.21%
1990	59	−1.76%
1999	47	−2.49%
2007	42	−1.40%
2012	44	+0.93%
2017	42	−0.93%
2023	51	+3.29%
Source: INSEE

== Sights ==
The Château de Saint-Élix-Séglan is a 14th-17th century castle which is listed as a historic site by the French Ministry of Culture in 1991.

== See also ==
- Communes of the Haute-Garonne department
