= Cazenave =

Cazenave may refer to:

- Cazenave-Serres-et-Allens, Ariège, France
- Cazenave, a common vine training system

== People with the surname ==
- Anny Cazenave, French geodesist
- Fernand Cazenave (1924–2005), French rugby union player and coach
- Guillermo Carlos Cazenave (born 1955), Argentinian composer, writer and journalist
- Hector Cazenave (1914–1958), Uruguayan-French footballer
- Laurent Cazenave (born 1978), French auto racing driver
- Louis de Cazenave (1897–2008), French veteran of World War I
- Noel Cazenave (born 1948), American sociologist
- Thomas Cazenave (born 1978), French civil servant and politician
- Pierre Louis Alphée Cazenave (1795–1877), French dermatologist

== See also ==
- Cazeneuve (disambiguation)
