= Château de Cazeneuve =

Castle in Nouvelle-Aquitaine, France

Coordinates: 42°23′15″N 0°19′06″W

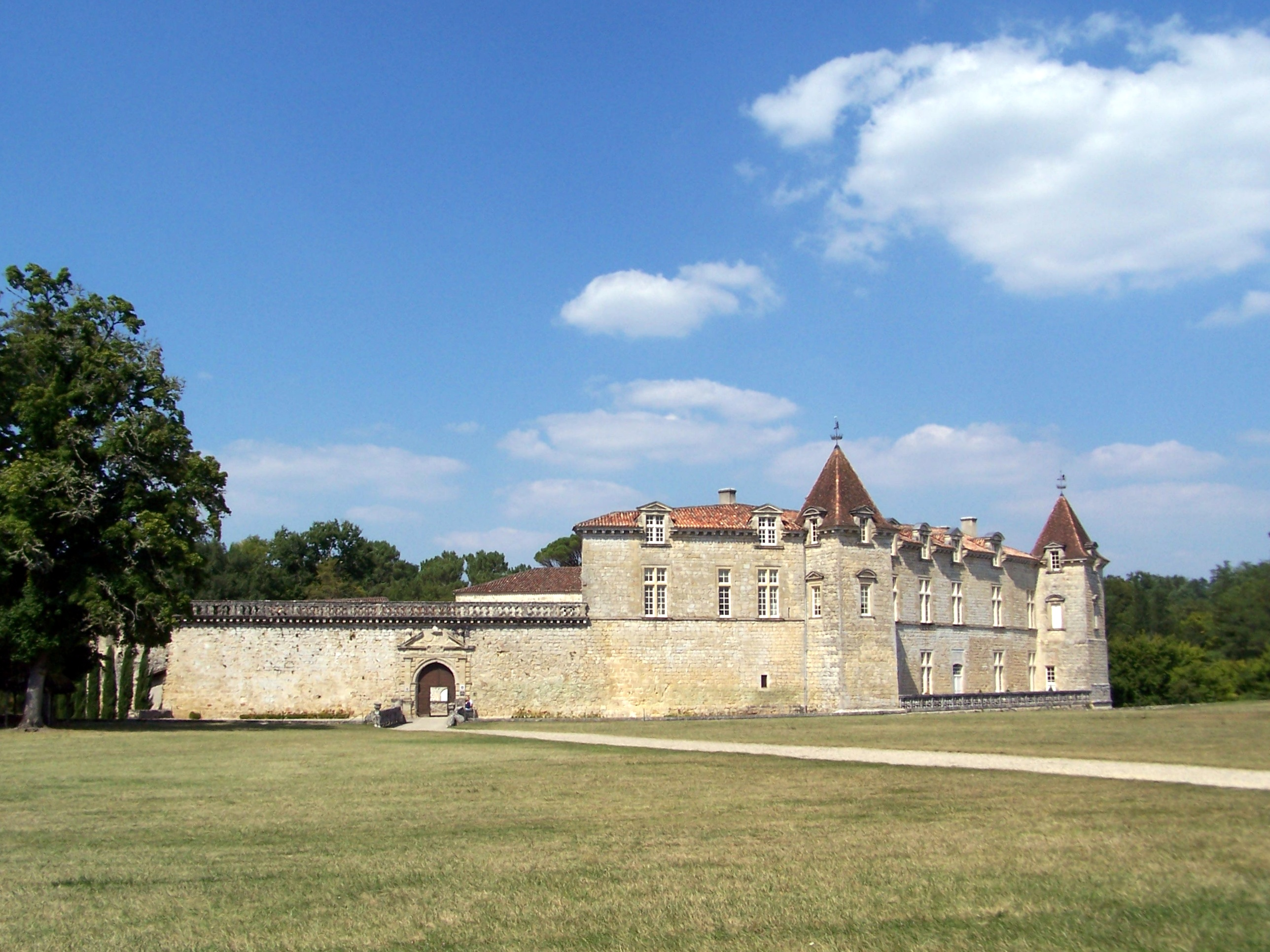
Château de Cazeneuve

The Château de Cazeneuve is a castle, converted into a comfortable château, in the commune of Préchac in the Gironde département of France. The castle was built along the gorges of the River Ciron and the stream of Honburens.

== History ==
The early castle was the former residence of the Kings of Navarre. It was built by Amanieu VII d'Albret on a rocky bank. It included in its enclosure the medieval mound of the 11th century preceded by a vast courtyard whose curtain walls protected the town.

In 1572, it became the property of Henri III of Navarre (the future King Henri IV of France), but because of financial problems he sold the castle in 1583.

In the 17th century, the building underwent a major overhaul. The medieval castle was then transformed into a pleasant and ceremonial château. It has since been restored regularly.

It was classified as a monument historique on 24 September 1965.

The castle still belongs to the Sabran-Pontevès family, descendants of the d'Albrets on the female side.

== Architecture ==
The site is made up of troglodyte caves under the castle and large underground medieval cellars.

The old parts are the advanced fortifications and the moats.

The buildings are a reconstruction dating from the 17th century.

The royal apartments are period furnished.

== Park and gardens ==
The wooded park runs along the Ciron and includes the lake, the mill, the wash house and the bird island. The part between the Ciron, the tributary of the Ciron and the CD 9 road is classified as a historic monument in the same way as the castle.

== Gallery ==
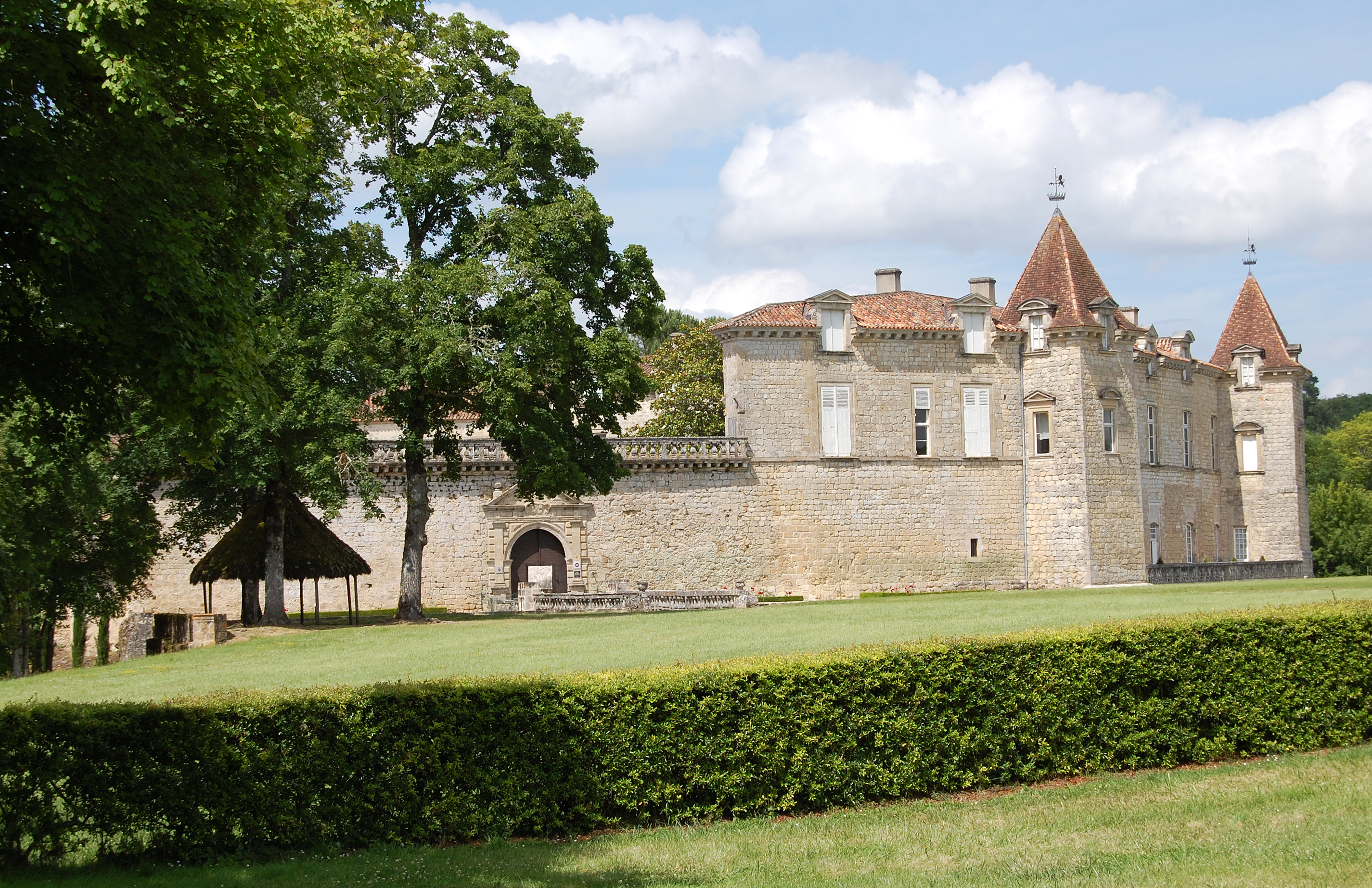

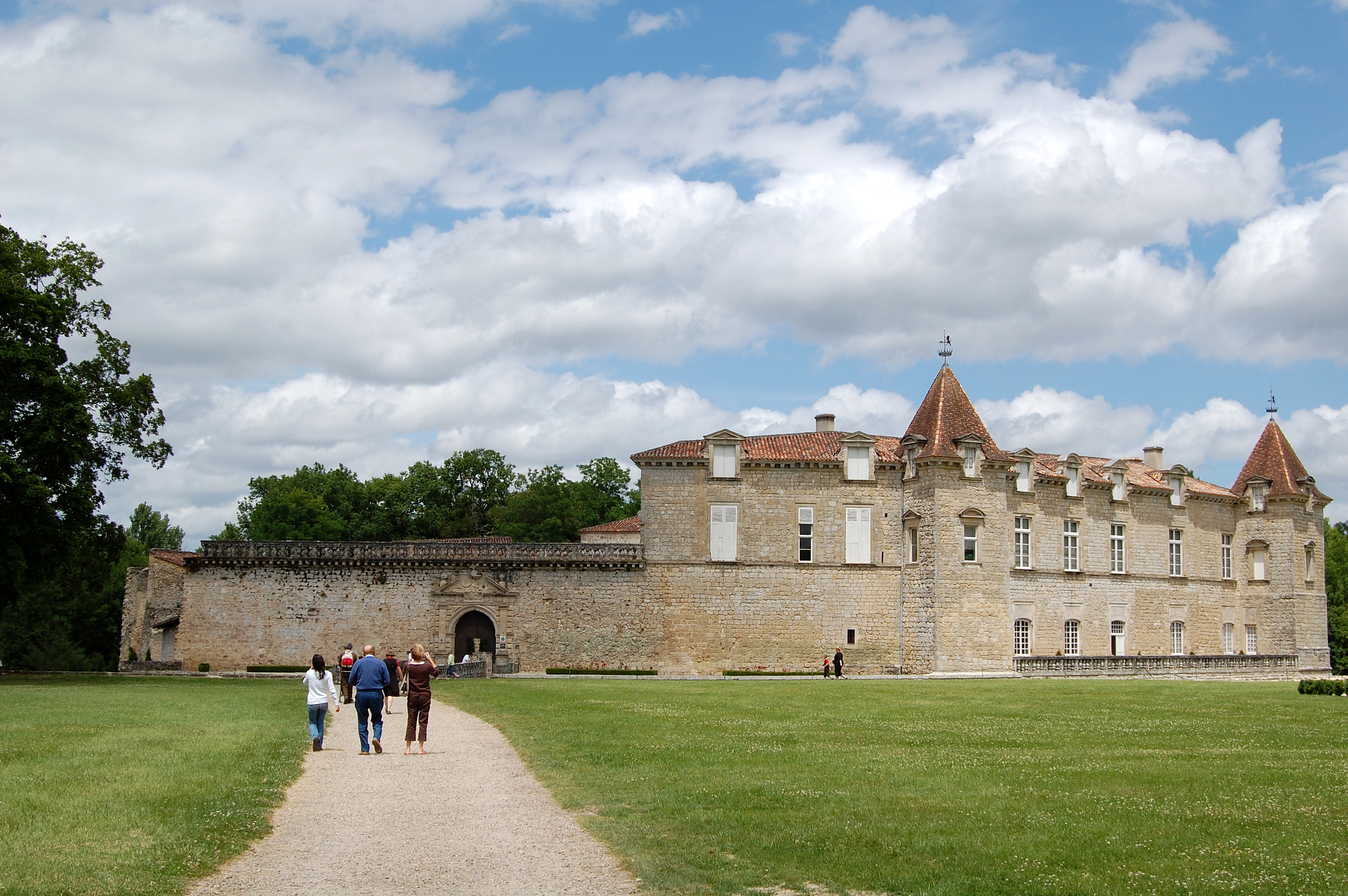

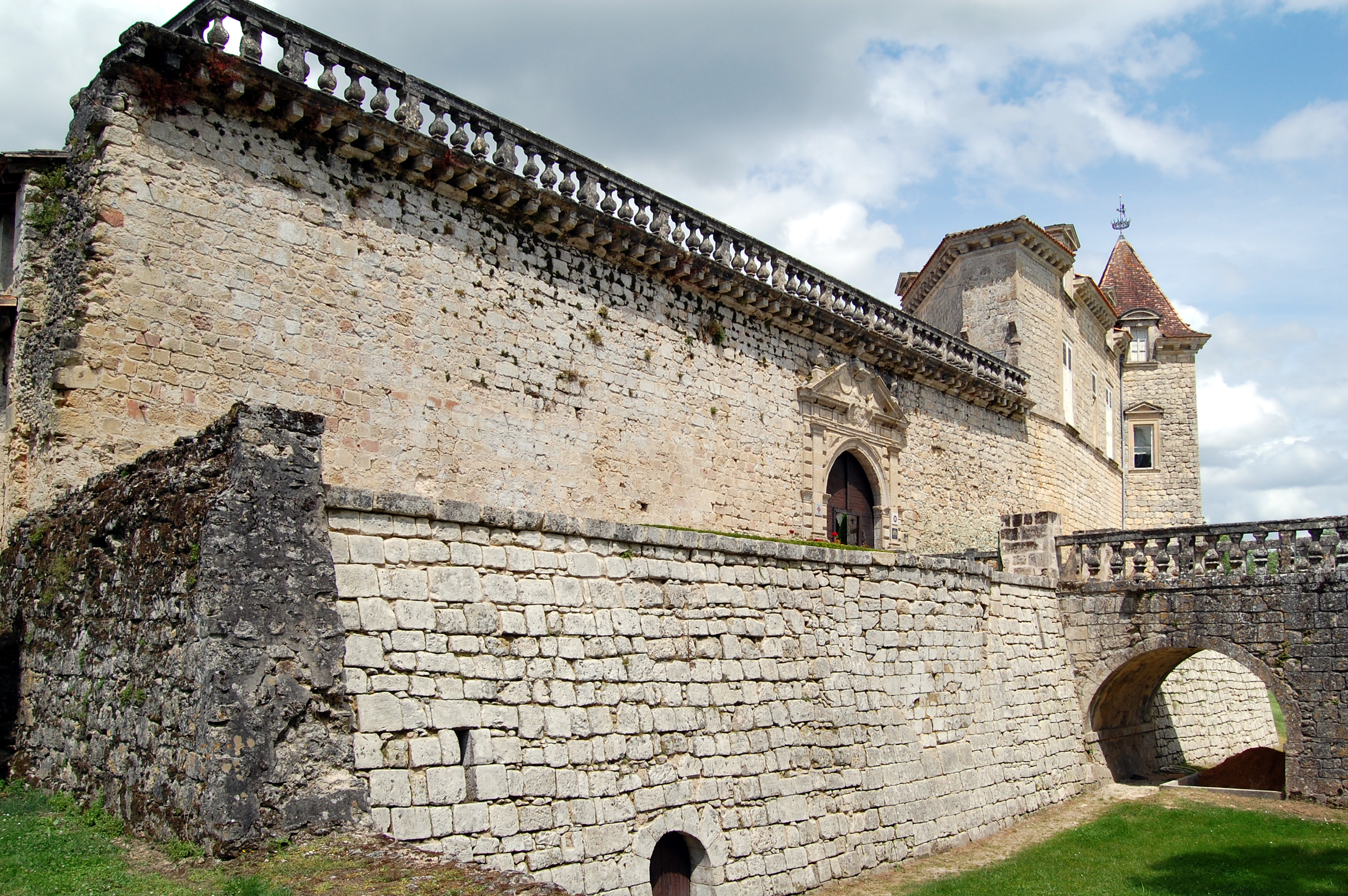

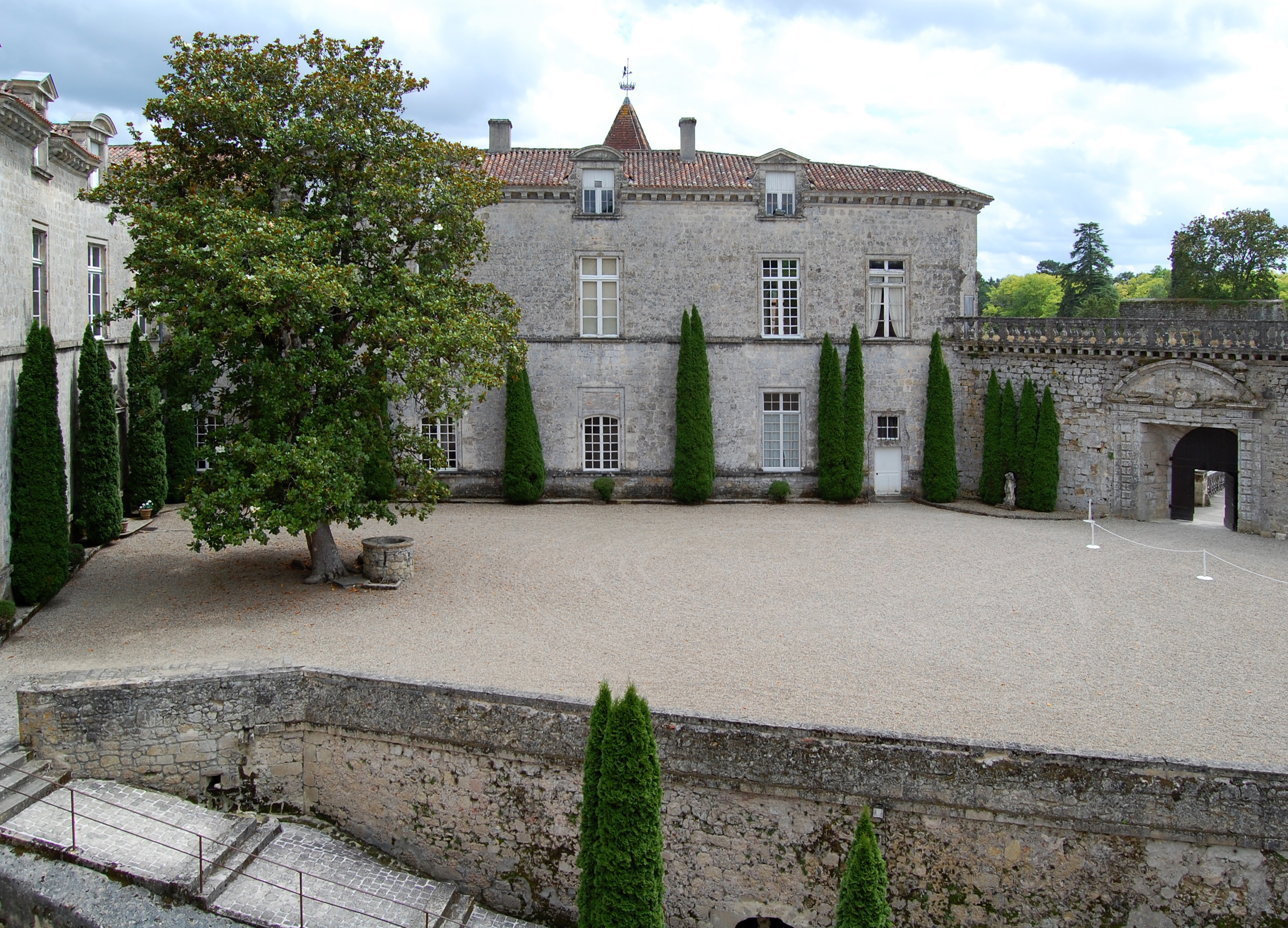

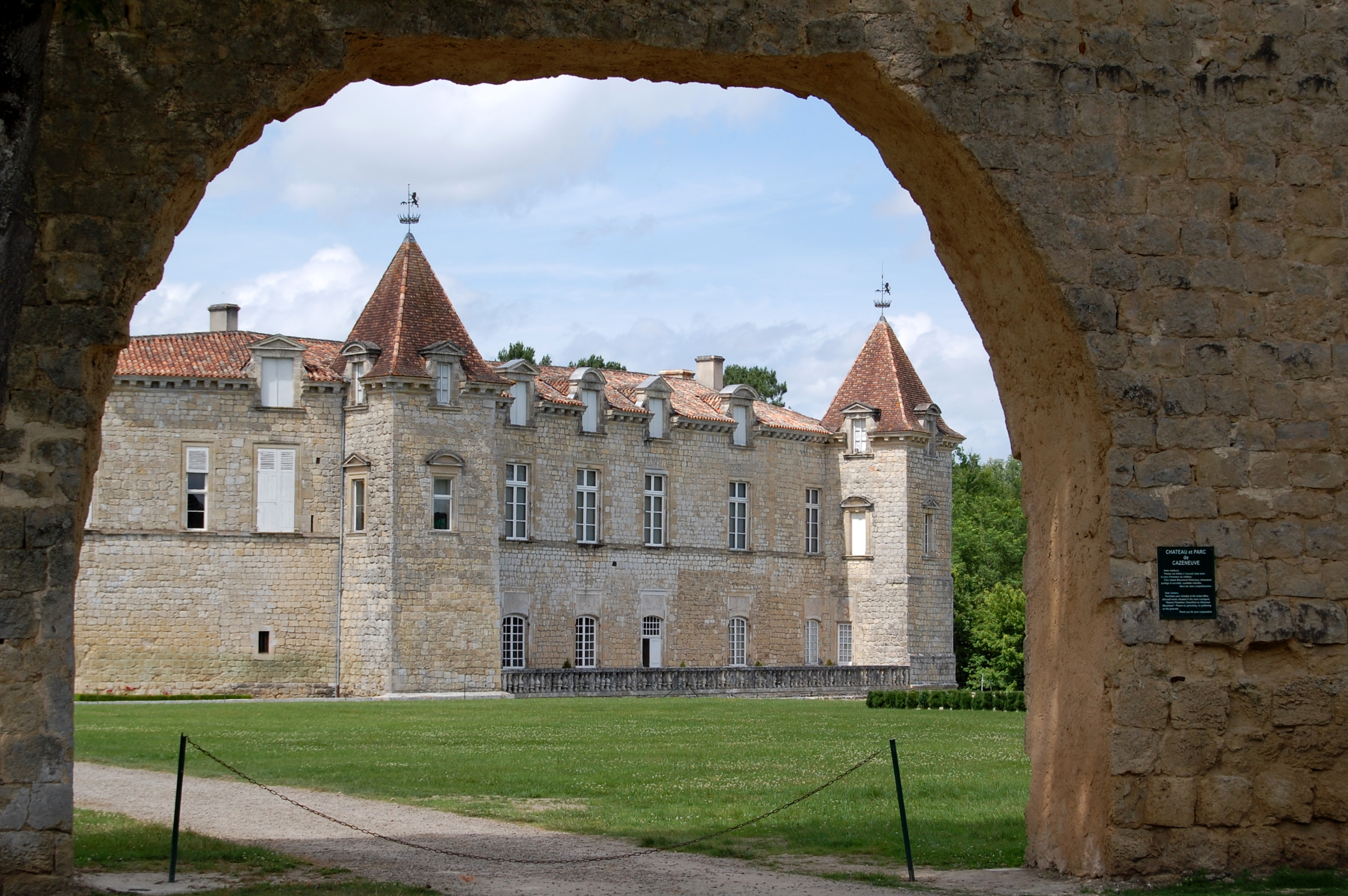

== See also ==
- List of castles in France
