= Aulon (Crete) =

Coordinates: 35°03′30″N 24°57′39″E

Aulon (Ancient Greek: Ἀϝλόν), known later as Alonion (Άλονίων), was a town and poleis (city-state) of ancient Crete. It is mentioned in a decree of 480 BCE of Gortyna where a series of privileges are granted to a person perhaps of foreign origin among which were land and housing in Aulon. Of this decree it has been deduced that Aulon was a city that was fortified and was dependent on Gortyna but that probably had autonomy in some aspects. About this relationship between Aulon and Gortyna analogies have been noted with that between Halicarnassus and Salmacis.

Its site is located near Agioi Deka ('Ten Saints'), which refers to ten Christian martyrs killed at the amphitheatre of Alonion.
