= Château de la Trave =

Château in Nouvelle-Aquitaine, France

Coordinates: 44°24′35″N 0°20′31″W

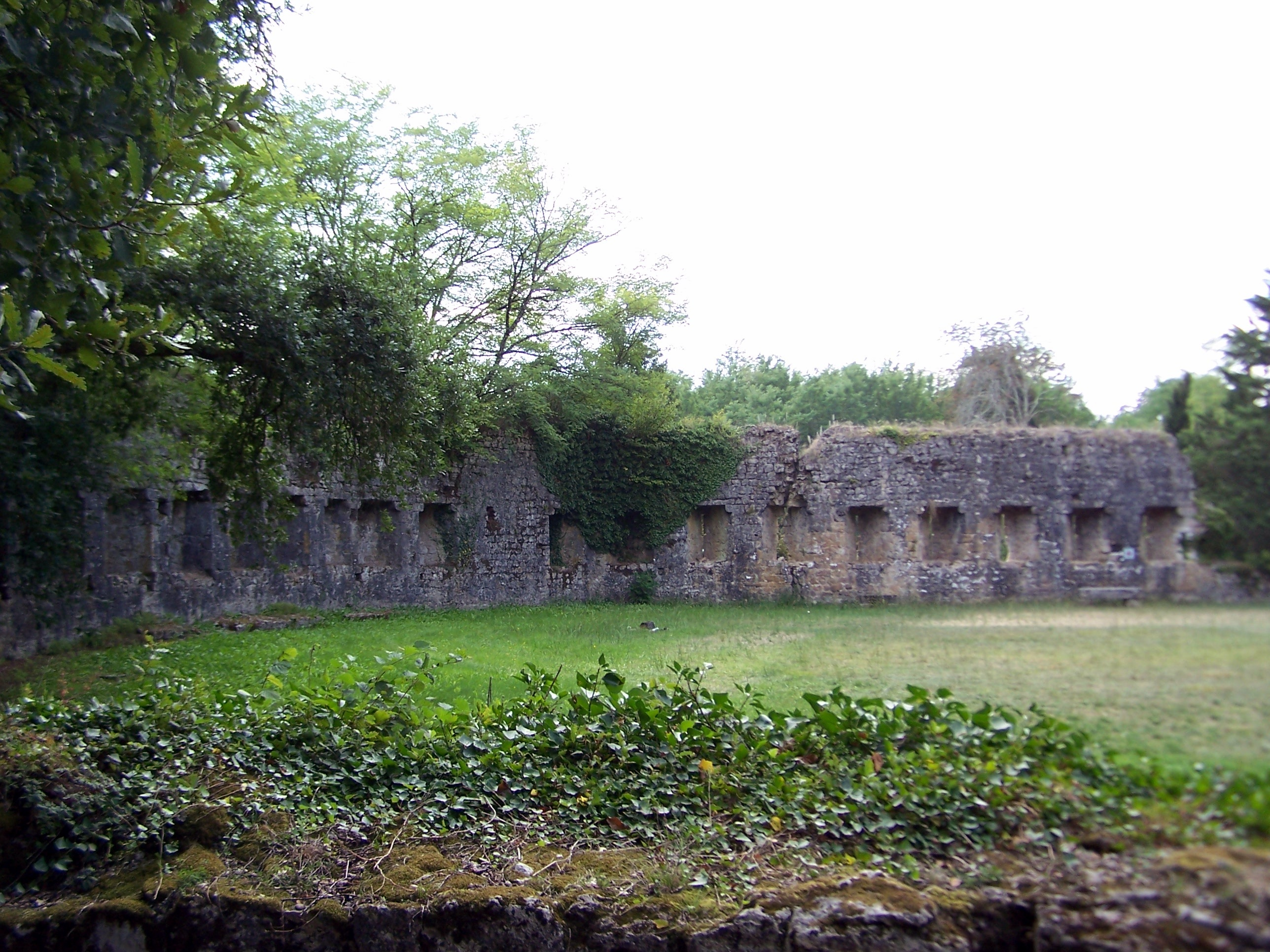
Castle de la Trave in Préchac (Gironde, France)

The Château de la Trave is a château in Préchac, Gironde, Nouvelle-Aquitaine, France.
