= List of fountains in Greece =

This is a list of notable fountains in Greece.

Name	Location	Era	Image
Argyrocastrou Square fountain	Rhodes (city)	Knights period	
Abdulhamid Pasha fountain	Chios (town)	Ottoman period	
Bembo fountain	Heraklion	Venetian period	
Chersonesos fountain	Hersonissos	Roman period	
Central square fountain	Larissa	Modern period	
Georgiou I Square fountain	Patras	Modern period	
Hippocampus fountain	Square of the Jewish Martyrs, Rhodes (city)	Italian period	
Hippokratous Square fountain	Rhodes (city)	Knights period	
Idomeneas fountain	Heraklion	Ottoman period	
Kotzia fountain	Kotzia Square, Athens	Modern period	
Ladadika fountain	Ladadika, Thessaloniki	Modern period	
Mandraki fountain	Harbour of Rhodes (city)	Italian period	
Metaxourgeio fountain	Metaxourgeio, Athens	Modern period	
Morosini fountain	Lions Square, Heraklion	Venetian period	
Neptune (Poseidon) fountain	Diafani, Karpathos	Modern period	
Navarinou fountain	Navarinou Square, Thessaloniki	Modern period	
Old fountain	Fountain Square, Thessaloniki	Ottoman period	
Omonoia fountain	Omonoia Square, Athens	Modern period	
Pirene fountain	Ancient Corinth	Roman period	
Priuli fountain	Heraklion	Venetian period	
Rimondi fountain	Rethymno	Venetian period	
Spilias Square fountain	Corfu	Modern period	
Spianada fountain	Spianada, Corfu	Modern period	
Syntagma Square fountain	Athens	Modern period, designed by Ernst Ziller	
Turkish fountain	Chania	Ottoman period	
Venizelou Square fountain	Chania	Venetian period	
Zappeion fountain	Zappeion, Athens	Modern period	

== See also ==
- Plateia
- List of gates in Greece
