= Avlon, Euboea =

Avlon Αυλών
- Municipal unit
- Location within the regional unit

- Location within Greece
- Coordinates: 38°30′N 24°08′E
- Country: Greece
- Administrative region: Central Greece
- Regional unit: Euboea
- Municipality: Kymi-Aliveri

Area
  - Municipal unit: 143.4 km^{2} (55.4 sq mi)

Population (2021)
  - Municipal unit: 4,027
  - Municipal unit density: 28.08/km^{2} (72.73/sq mi)
- Time zone: UTC+2 (EET)
  - Summer (DST): UTC+3 (EEST)
- Vehicle registration: ΧΑ

Avlon or Avlonas (Greek: Αυλών/Αυλώνας) is a former municipality in Euboea, Greece. Since the 2011 local government reform it is part of the municipality Kymi-Aliveri, of which it is a municipal unit. The municipal unit has an area of 143.406 km^{2}. In 2021 its population was 4,027. The seat of the municipality was in Avlonari.

== Subdivisions ==
The municipal unit Avlon is subdivided into the following communities (constituent villages in brackets):

- Achladeri (Achladeri, Kalamos, Korasida, Perivolia, Sykies)
- Agios Georgios
- Avlonari (Avlonari, Chania, Dafni, Elaia, Lofiskos)
- Neochori
- Oktonia (Oktonia, Agios Merkourios, Mourteri)
- Orio (Orio, Myrtea)
- Orologi (Orologi, Agia Thekla, Prinaki)
- Pyrgi
