= List of gates in Greece =

This is a list of notable gates in Greece.

| Name | Location | Era | Image |
|---|---|---|---|
| Anna Palaiologina Kantakouzene Gate | Walls of Thessaloniki | Byzantine period | |
| Araroporta | Nicopolis | Roman period | |
| Arch of Galerius | Thessaloniki | Roman period | |
| Arch of Hadrian (Athens) | Athens | Roman period | |
| Beulé Gate | Acropolis of Athens | Ancient period | |
| Demmatas Gate | Fortifications of Heraklion | Venetian period | |
| Gate of Athena Archegetis | Roman Agora, Athens | Roman period | |
| Gate of the Arsenal | Rhodes (city) | Knights period | |
| Guora Gate | Rethymno | Venetian period | |
| Jesus Gate | Fortifications of Heraklion | Venetian period | |
| Kommeno-Bedeni Gates | Heraklion | Venetian period | |
| Lion Gate | Mycenae | Ancient period | |
| Old fortress Gate | Corfu | Venetian period | |
| Pantokratoras and Chanioporta Gate | Fortifications of Heraklion | Venetian and Modern period | |
| Phoros Gate | Kos | Knights period | |
| Portara Gate | Naxos | Ancient period | |
| Portara Gate (Thessaloniki) | Walls of Thessaloniki | Byzantine period | |
| Propylaea | Acropolis of Athens | Ancient period | |
| Spilias Gate | Corfu | Venetian period | |
| Saint Athanasios Gate | Fortifications of Rhodes | Knights period | |
| Saint John Gate | Fortifications of Rhodes | Knights period | |
| Virgin Gate | Rhodes (city) | Knights period | |
| Xiras Gate | Acronauplia | Venetian period | |

== See also ==
- List of castles in Greece
- List of fountains in Greece
