= Château de Saint-Élix-Séglan =

Castle in Saint-Élix-Séglan in the Haute-Garonne département of France

Coordinates: 43°11′42″N 0°51′8″E

The Château de Saint-Élix is a castle in the commune of Saint-Élix-Séglan in the Haute-Garonne département of France.

The castle was originally constructed in the 14th century, with developments in the 15th and 17th. The Château de Saint-Elix is a modest fortified house situated on the summit of a hill dominating the valley of the Noue River. It consists of a mediaeval nucleus, a tower-house from the 14th-15th centuries and a two-storey house built in the 17th century.

Privately owned, it has been listed since 1991 as a monument historique by the French Ministry of Culture.

== See also ==
- List of castles in France
