= Pyrgos Kallistis =

Pyrgos Kallistis Πύργος Καλλίστης
- Community
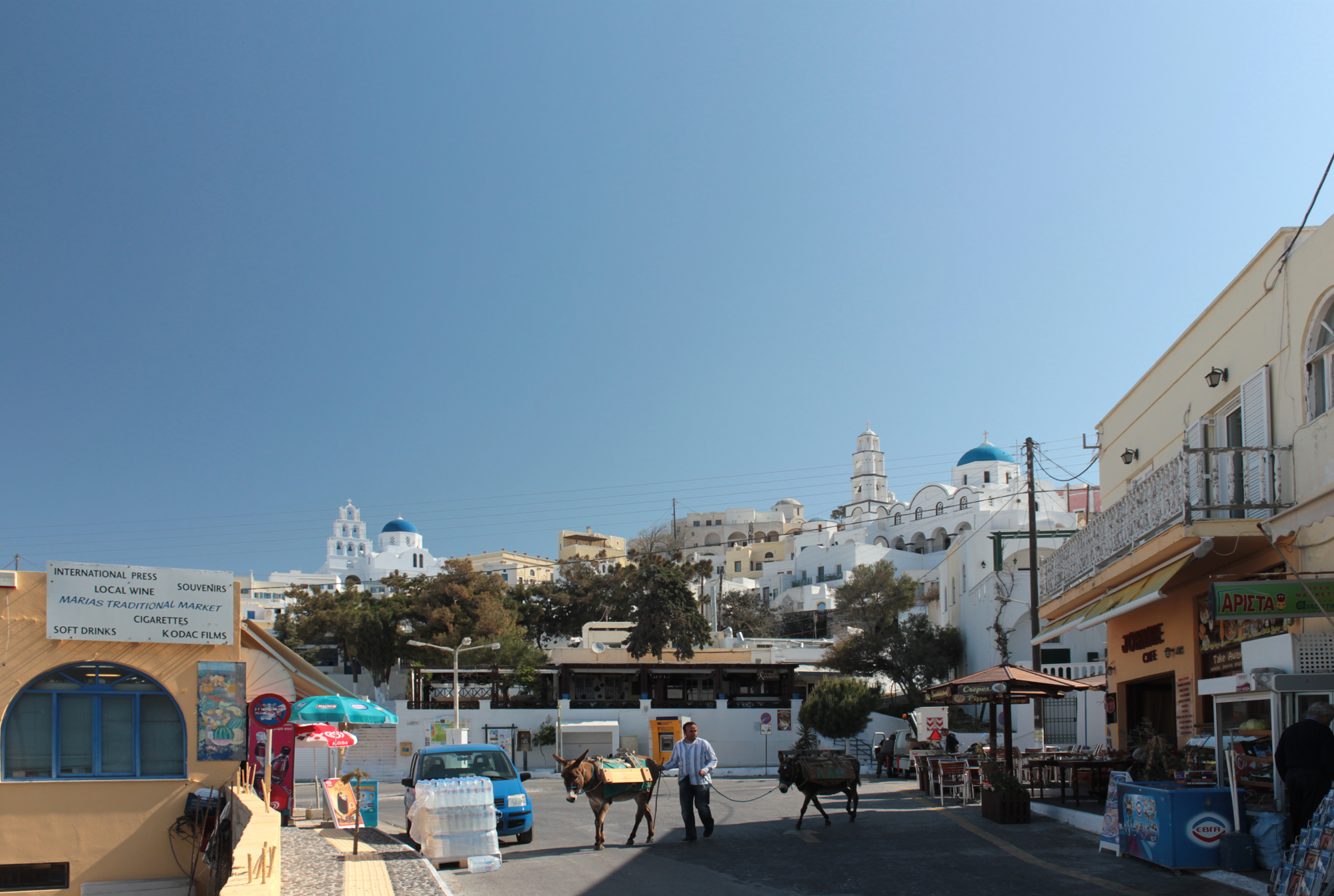
- Pyrgos' main square

- Location within Greece
- Coordinates: 36°22′59″N 25°26′58″E
- Country: Greece
- Administrative region: South Aegean
- Regional unit: Thira
- Municipality: Thira
- Municipal unit: Thira

Population (2021)
  - Community: 1,078
- Time zone: UTC+2 (EET)
  - Summer (DST): UTC+3 (EEST)

Pyrgos Kallistis (Greek: Πύργος Καλλίστης, lit. 'Beauty Tower') or simply Pyrgos (Greek: Πύργος, lit. 'Tower') is a village on the Aegean island of Santorini, Greece, in the Cyclades archipelago with a population of 1,078 according to the 2021 census. Pyrgos is part of the Municipality of Thira and is situated approximately 7 km away from the island's capital Fira. It is built amphitheatrically on a hill that offers magnificent views of Santorini in almost all directions. On top of this hill remain the ruins of a Venetian castle (Kasteli) that was once the island's administrative center. Pyrgos is a typical example of medieval architecture with narrow, labyrinthine streets, fortified walls and hidden passages. Nowadays it is one of the villages of Santorini least spoiled by tourism.

== Gallery ==
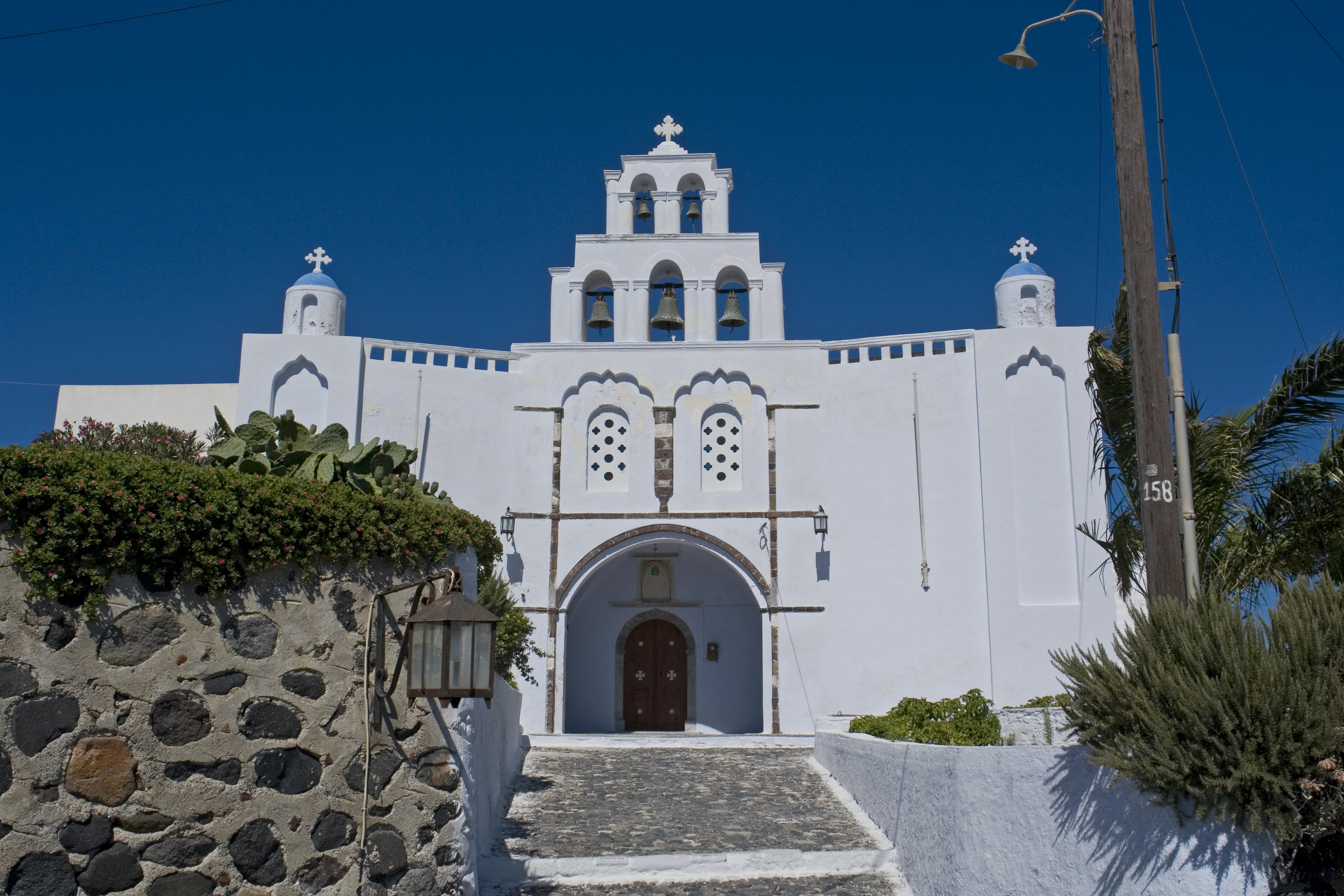
Presentation of Mary Church in Pyrgos

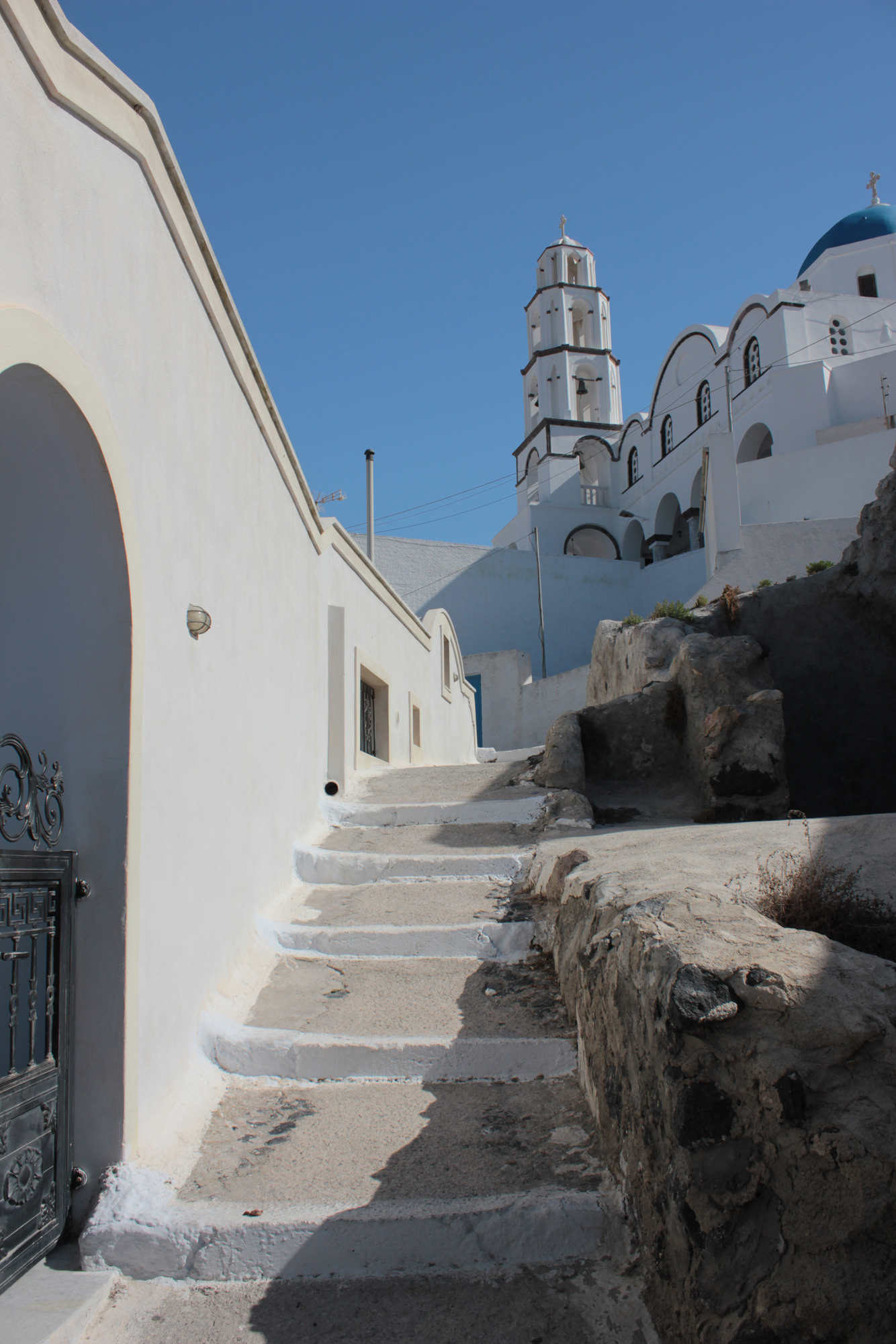
A street in the old town

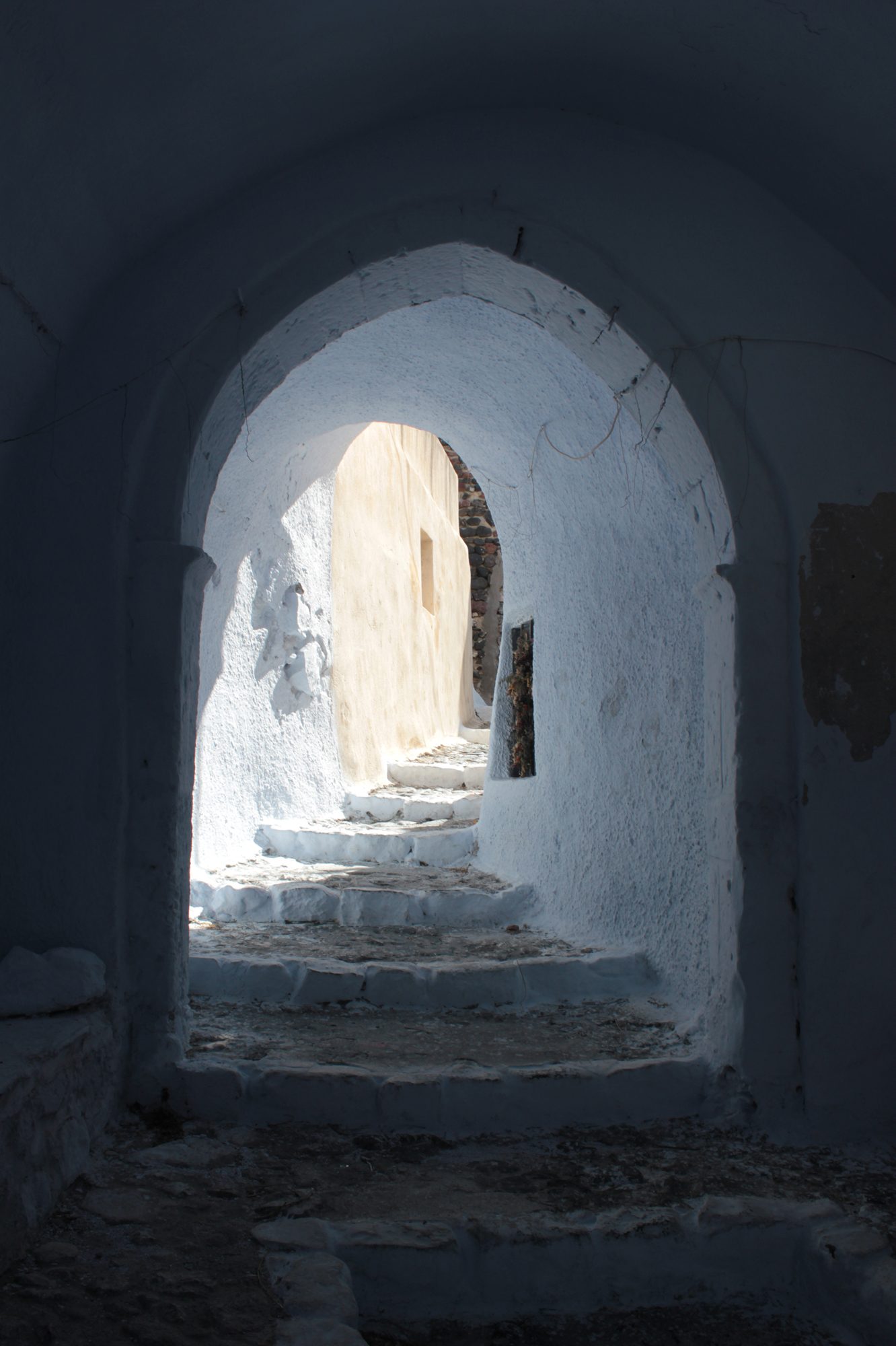
A passage

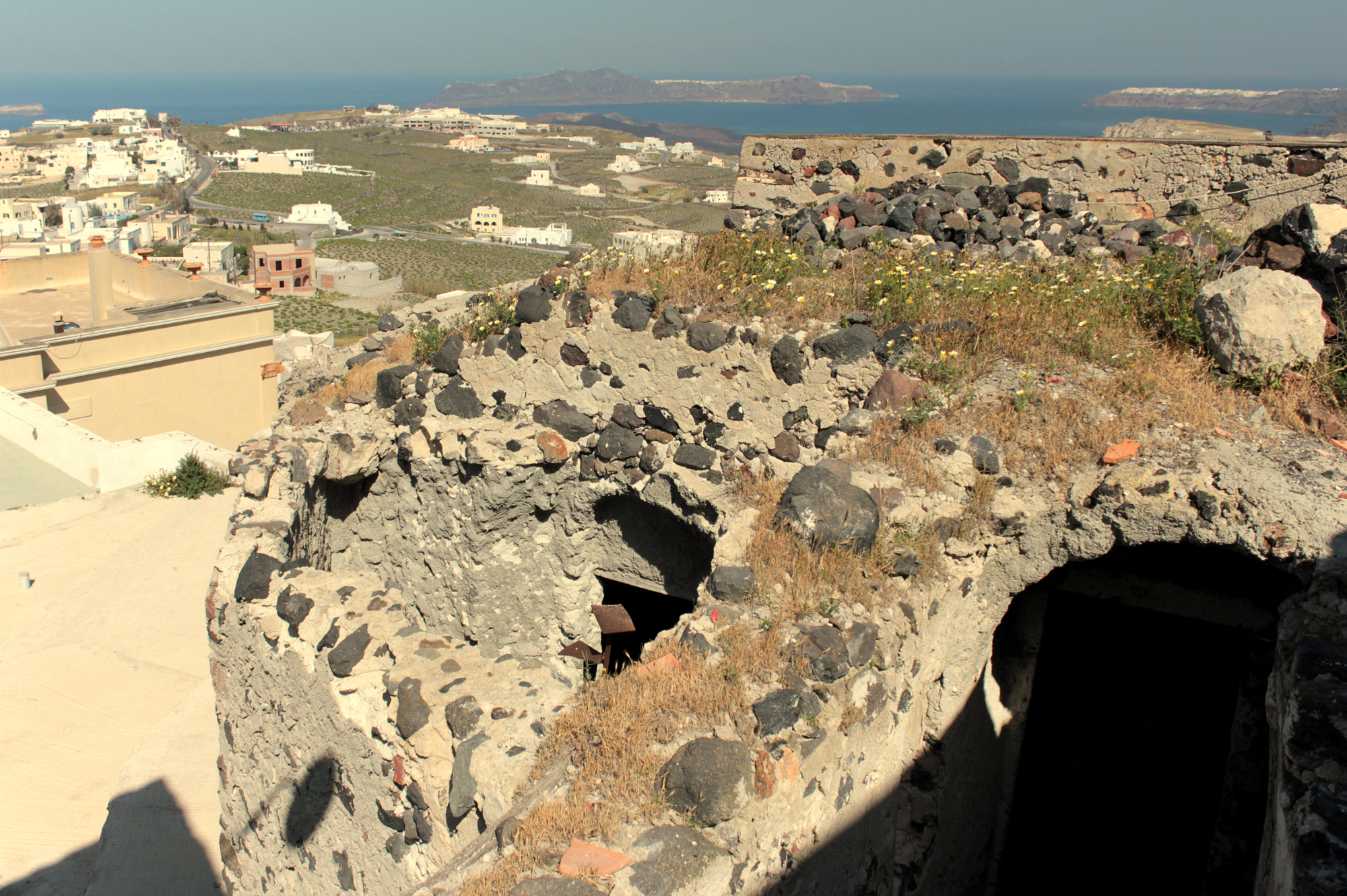
View from the ruins of Kasteli

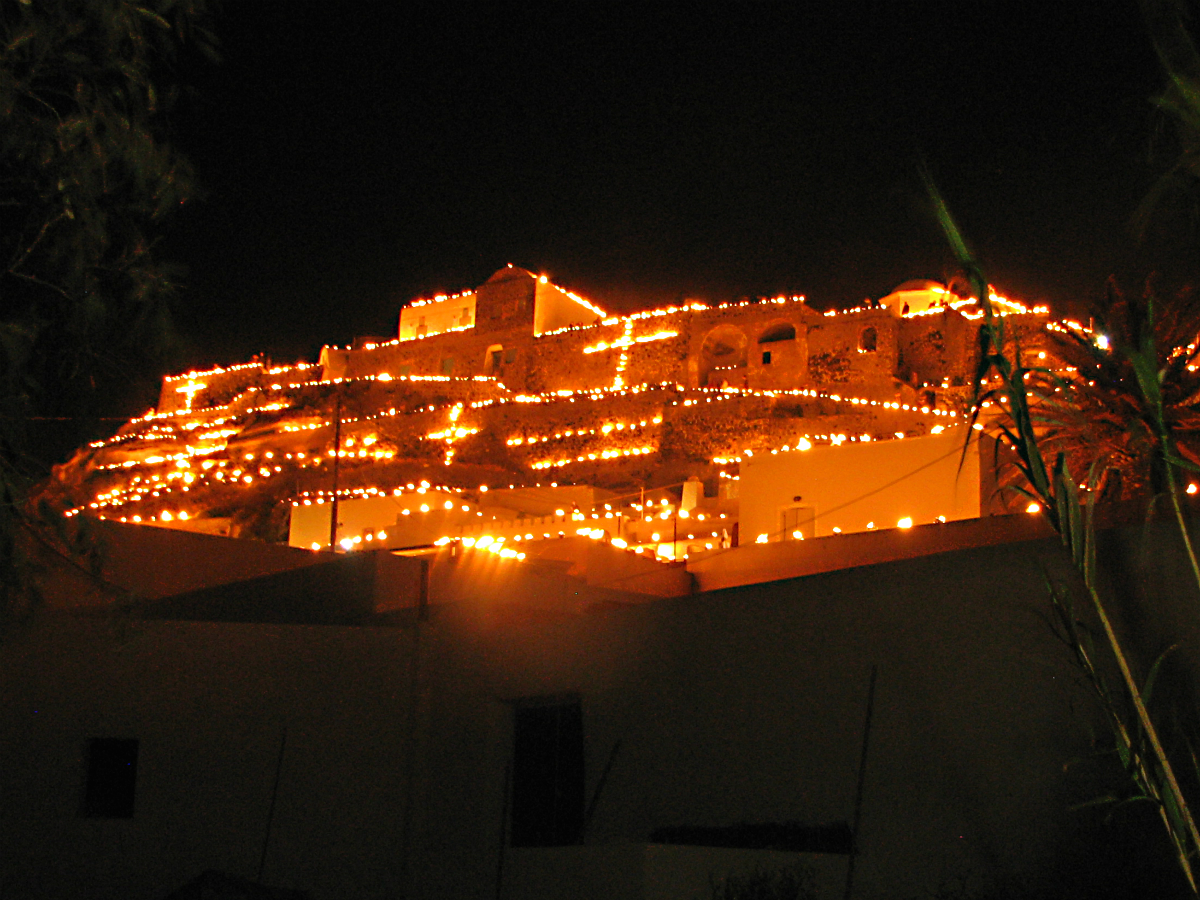
Kasteli lit up on a Good Friday night

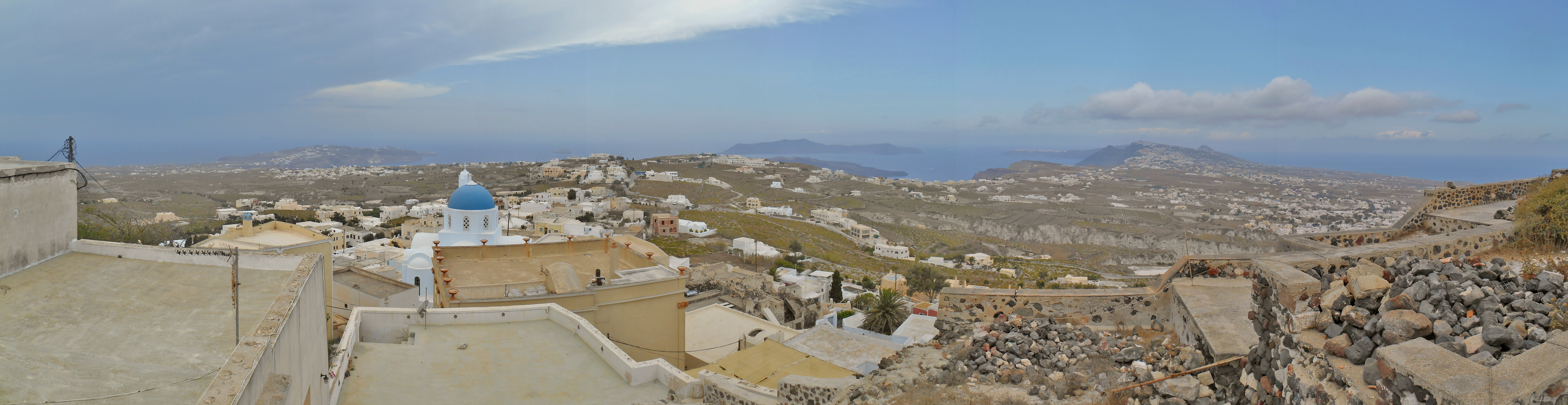
Panoramic view of most of the island from Pyrgos
