= Avlonari =

Avlonari Αυλωνάρι
- Community
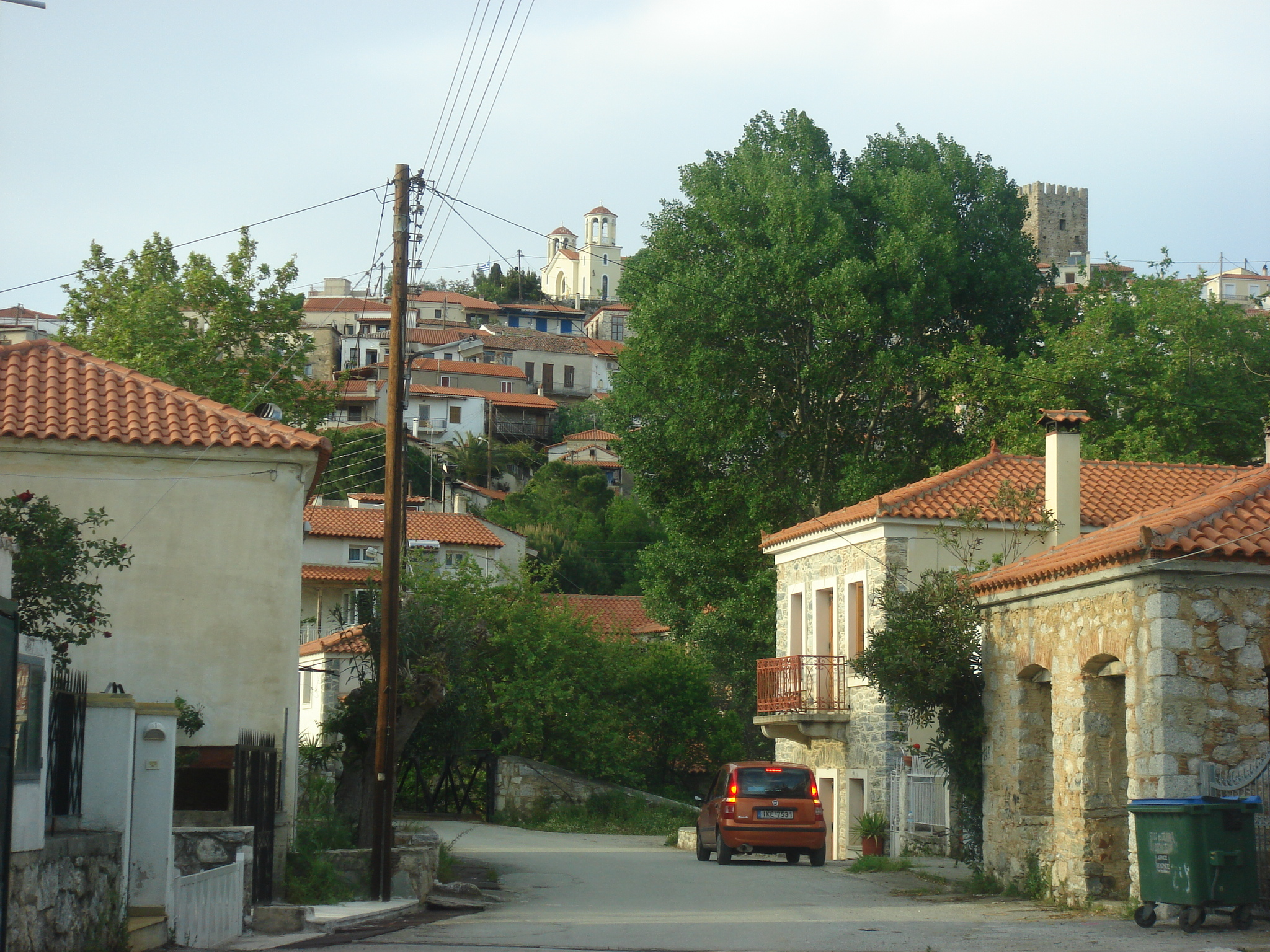

- Location within Greece
- Coordinates: 38°30′N 24°08′E
- Country: Greece
- Administrative region: Central Greece
- Regional unit: Euboea
- Municipality: Kymi-Aliveri
- Municipal unit: Avlon

Population (2021)
  - Community: 1,273
- Time zone: UTC+2 (EET)
  - Summer (DST): UTC+3 (EEST)

Avlonari (Greek: Αυλωνάρι) is a village and a community (unit) of the Municipality Kymi-Aliveri, in the eastern part of the Aegean island of Euboea, Greece. It was the seat of the municipality of Avlon, and the medieval town and bishopric of Aulon, which remains a Latin Catholic titular see.

The community includes the villages Chania, Dafni, Elaia and Lofiskos. Avlonari is situated on a hillside, 13km northeast of Aliveri, 15km south of Kymi, Greece and 47km east of Chalcis.

== Population ==
Year	Town population	Community population
1981	-	1,573
1991	776	-
2001	761	1,539
2011	637	1,354
2021	662	1,273

== History ==
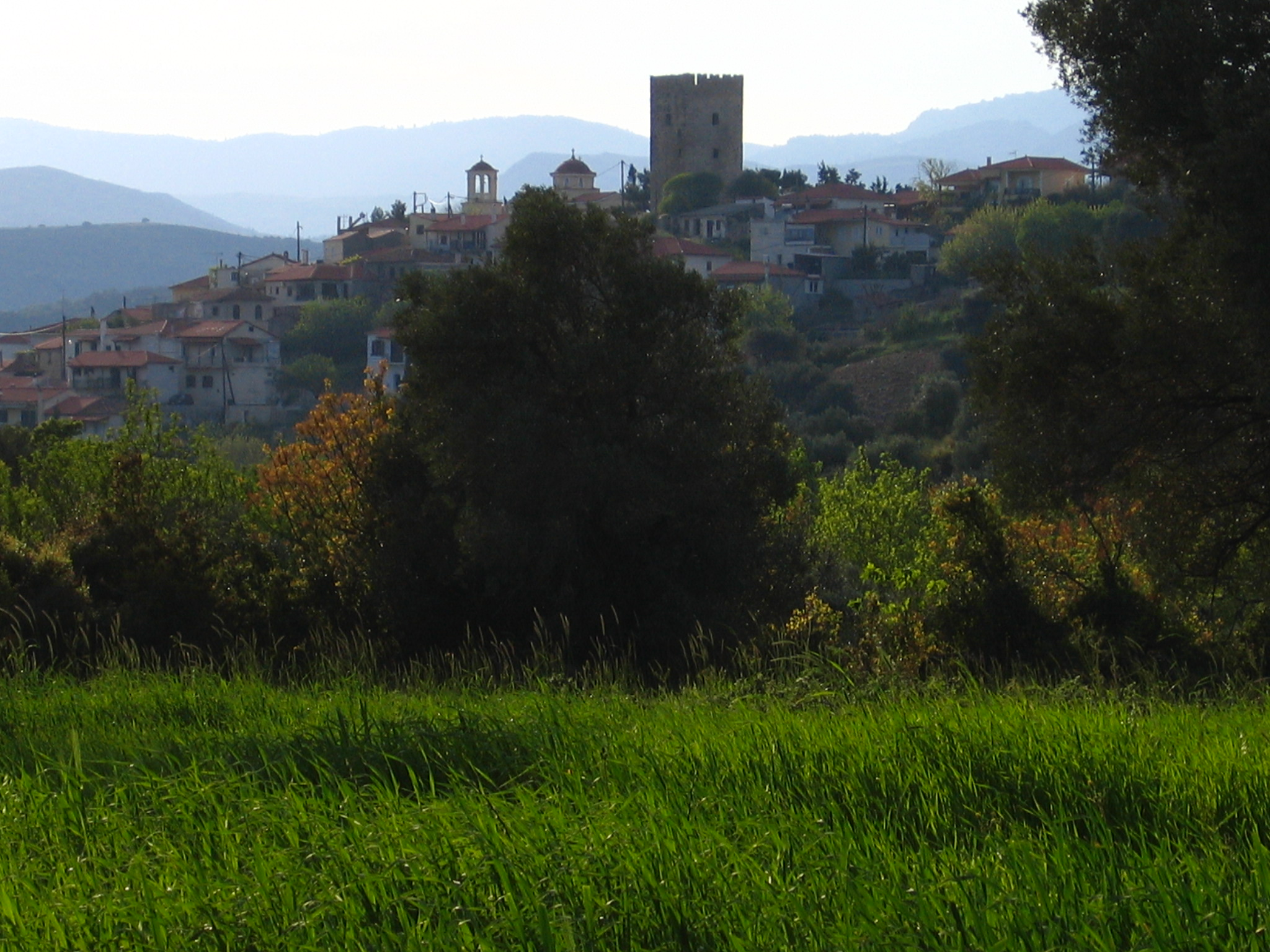
Avlonari, with the medieval watch-tower

Modern Avlonari is usually identified with Avlon or Aulon (Greek: Αὐλών), a town and bishopric attested since the 9th century. Aulon appears in the Notitiae Episcopatuum, commencing with that of Byzantine Emperor Leo VI the Wise (r. 886–912) as a suffragan of the metropolitan see of Athens, in the sway of the Patriarchate of Constantinople. No names of its first-millennium bishops are known. The Byzantine-era church of St. Demetrios at Chania, in the lowland below Avlonari, built by reusing material from an earlier church, may have been the bishopric's seat.

After the Fourth Crusade (1202–04), Euboea was captured by Crusaders, who divided the island and established Lombard baronies, and Aulon became a diocese of the Latin Church. A Greek, Theodoros, was appointed, but destituted by the Latin Archbishop of Athens, for refusing to receive his consecration according to the Latin rite; Pope Innocent III restored him after obtaining his liturgical submission (December 1208). yet a papal letter from July 1210 already mentions "bishop-elect", plausibly to replace the troublesome Greek Theodoros, whom Innocent III addressed two more letters in 1211.

In about 1222, the see of Aulon (known in Italian as la Valona) was merged with the Bishopric of Negroponte. This was disputed from 1235 on, leading to the restoration of a separate bishop for Aulon (episcopus Abilonensis) in 1240. Aulon in attested as a fief in the 14th century, and in the 15th century, under Venetian rule, as an administrative district. The district was led by two captains (Capitanei Avalone), who had their seats on fortresses in the nearby heights of Cuppa and Potiri. A three-story watch tower also survives in Avlonari itself.

The town was raided by the Ottoman Turks in 1423, and captured, along with the rest of Euboea by the Ottoman Empire in 1470. Under Ottoman rule, the bishopric of Aulon was merged with a new, Orthodox Metropolis of Euripus.

== Titular see ==
No longer a residential bishopric, this Aulon is today listed by the Catholic Church as a titular bishopric, being distinguished from an Adriatic diocese Aulon by using for the Euboean Aulon the Latin adjective Aulonensis, while the Latin adjective regarding the other Aulon in Epirus (modern Vlore, in Albania) is Aulonitanus.

The diocese was nominally restored in 1933 as Latin Catholic titular bishopric.

It is vacant, having had the following incumbents, so far of the fitting Episcopal (lowest) rank :

- Tomás Juan Carlos Solari (1943.08.23 – 1948.09.20) as Auxiliary Bishop of Buenos Aires (Argentina) (1943.08.23 – 1948.09.20); later Metropolitan Archbishop of La Plata (Argentina) (1948.09.20 – death 1954.05.13)
- Manuel Tato (1948.11.13 – 1961.07.11) as Auxiliary Bishop of Buenos Aires (Argentina) (1948.11.13 – 1961.07.11); later Bishop of Santiago del Estero (Argentina) (1961.07.11 – death 1980.08.12)
- Manuel Augusto Cárdenas (1962.04.07 – death 1998.07.28), first as Auxiliary Bishop of Buenos Aires (1962.04.07 – 1975.04.22), then as Auxiliary Bishop of Argentina of the Eastern Rite (1975.11.11 – 1992.02.11), finally on emeritate.

== See also ==
- List of Catholic dioceses in Greece
- Aulon for (ancient) namesakes
- List of settlements in the Euboea regional unit

== Sources and external links ==
- GCatholic
- Video on Avlonari from ERT's travelling program Traveling in Greece (Menoume Ellada) (in Greek)
