= Préchac, Gironde =

Préchac
- Commune
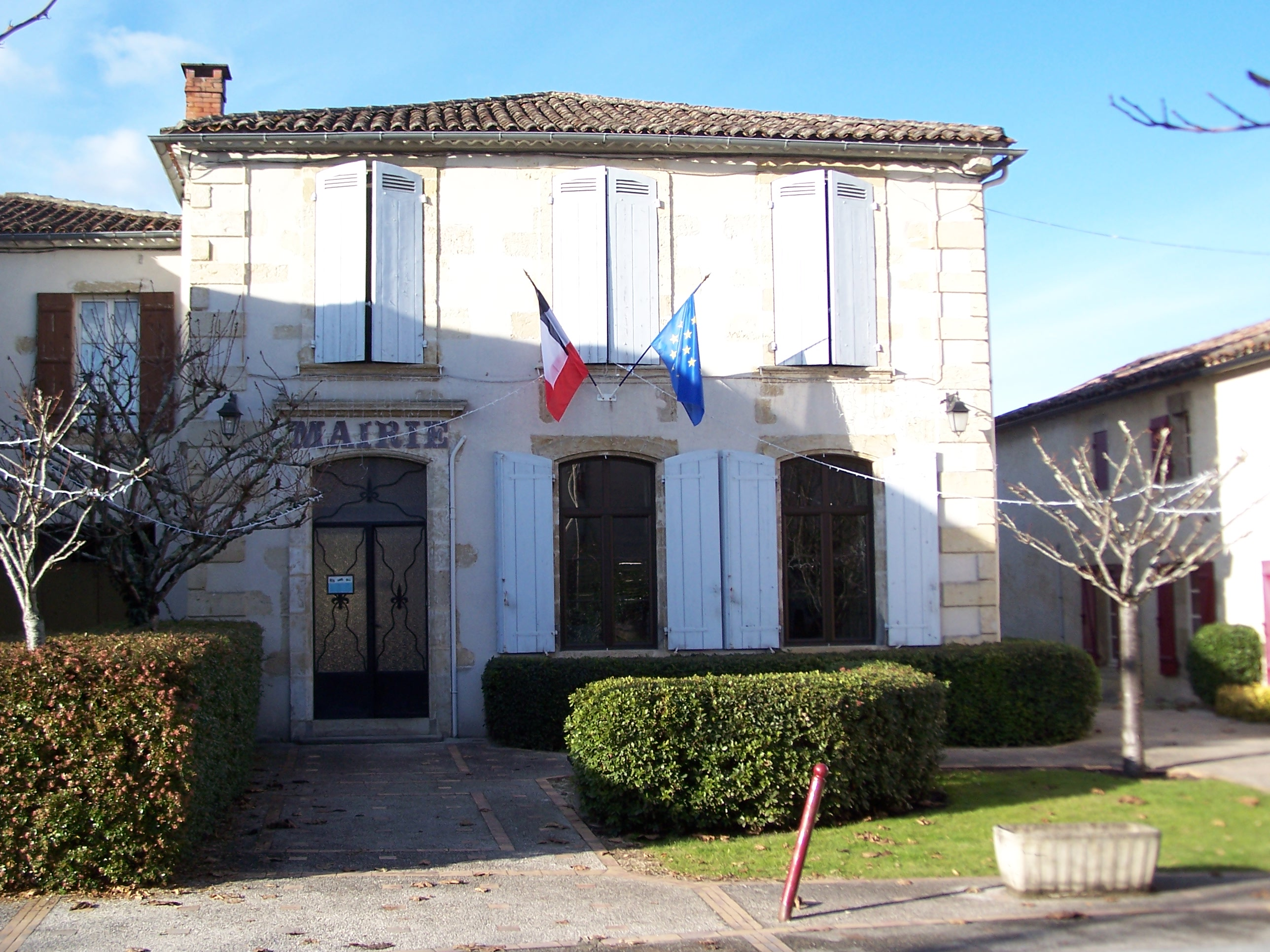
- Town hall

- Coat of arms
- Location of Préchac
- Location within France Location within Nouvelle-Aquitaine
- Coordinates: 44°24′02″N 0°21′07″W
- Country: France
- Region: Nouvelle-Aquitaine
- Department: Gironde
- Arrondissement: Langon
- Canton: Le Sud-Gironde

Government
  - Mayor (2020–2026): Michel Mortagne
- Area^{1}: 63.87 km^{2} (24.66 sq mi)
- Elevation: 45 m (148 ft)
- Highest elevation: 93 m (305 ft)
- Lowest elevation: 26 m (85 ft)
- Population (2023): 1,061
  - Density: 16.61/km^{2} (43.02/sq mi)
- Time zone: UTC+01:00 (CET)
  - Summer (DST): UTC+02:00 (CEST)
- INSEE/Postal code: 33336 /33730
- ^{1} French Land Register data, which excludes lakes, ponds, glaciers > 1 km^{2} (0.386 sq mi or 247 acres) and river estuaries.

Préchac (French pronunciation: [pʁeʃak]; Occitan: Preishac) is a commune in the Gironde department in Nouvelle-Aquitaine in southwestern France.

== Population ==
Historical population
Year	Pop.	±% p.a.
1968	1,050	—
1975	1,007	−0.60%
1982	953	−0.78%
1990	985	+0.41%
1999	1,017	+0.36%
2007	1,017	+0.00%
2012	1,051	+0.66%
2017	1,010	−0.79%
2023	1,061	+0.82%
Source: INSEE

== See also ==
- Communes of the Gironde department
- Château de la Trave
