= Potiri Castle =

Medieval fortress in Euboea island, Greece

Coordinates: 38°29′12″N 24°08′51″E

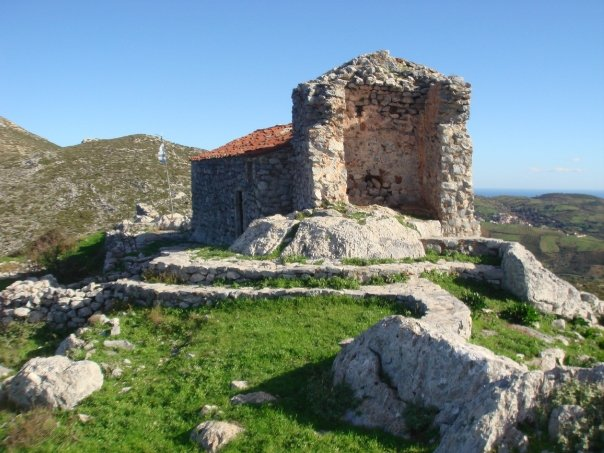
Remains of Potiri Castle

Potiri Castle (Greek: Κάστρο Ποτήρι) is a medieval fortress in the centre of the Greek island of Euboea.

The castle of Potiri is located on the western slopes of Mount Ochthonia, southeast of the village of Avlonari in central Euboea. It is first attested in 1426 (castel de comun dito Potiris) as a Venetian fortress, seat of one of the two captains of the local district (along with the Castle of Cuppa).

Remains of the castle include parts of the curtain wall, a tower, and a church dedicated to the Panagia.
