= Koules Fortress =

Fortress in Crete, Greece

Koules
- Κούλες
- Part of the fortifications of Heraklion
- Heraklion, Crete, Greece
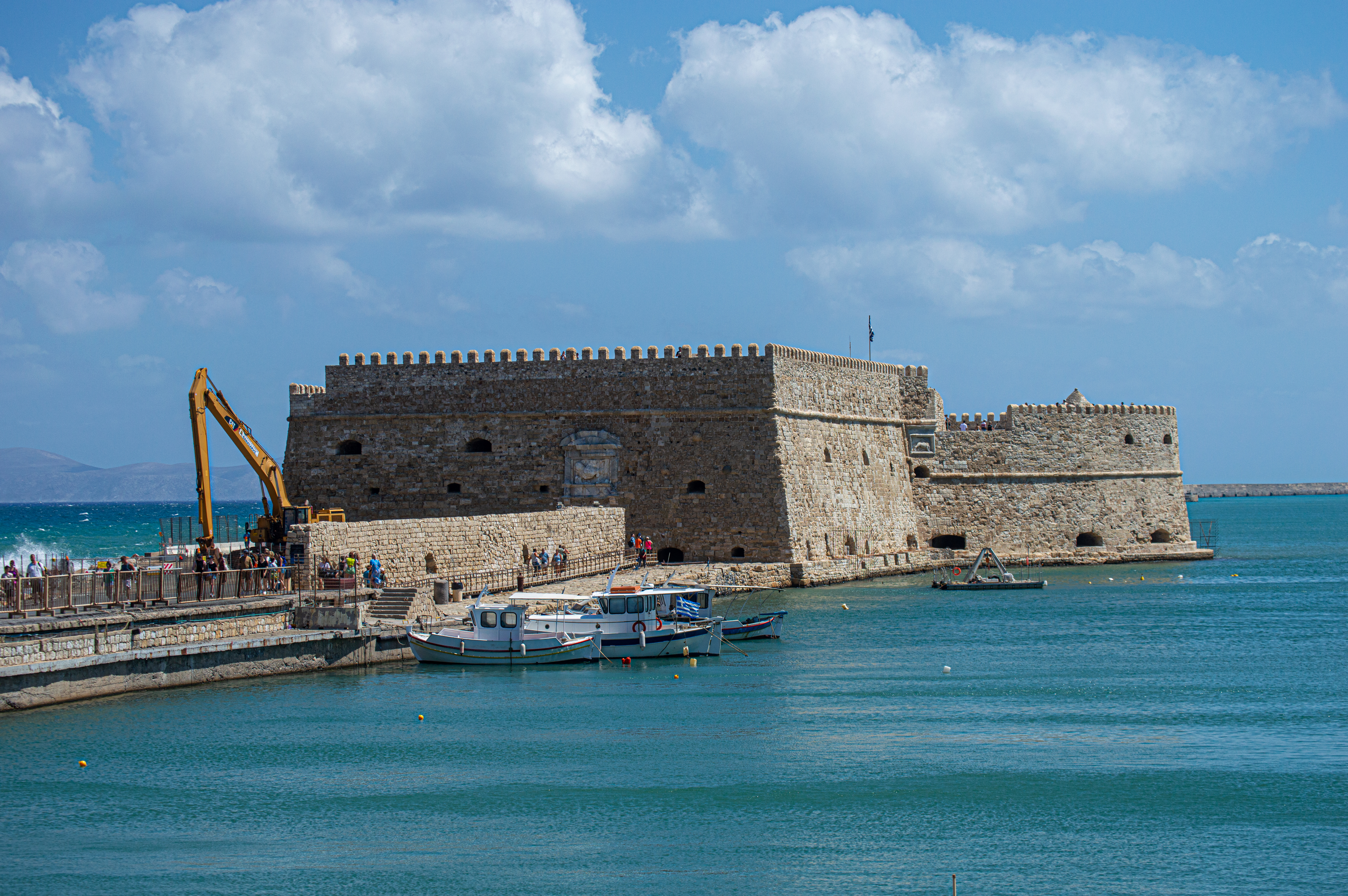
- The Koules fortress

Site information
- Type: Fort
- Owner: Hellenic Ministry of Culture
- Controlled by: Republic of Venice 1573–1646; Ottoman Empire 1646–1898; Cretan State 1898–1913
- Open to the public: Yes
- Condition: Intact
- Website: koules.efah.gr

Location
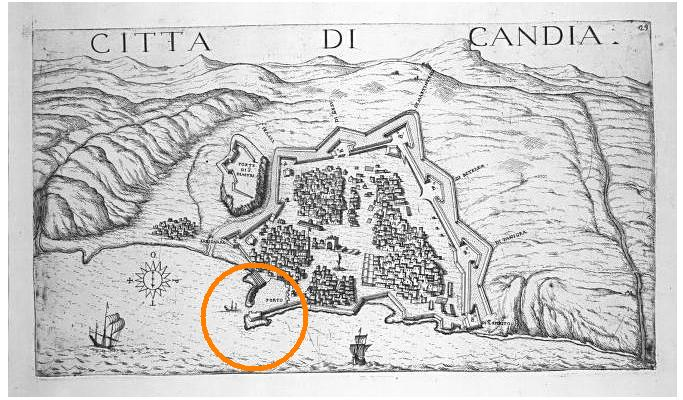
- Map of Candia (modern Heraklion) with Koules circled
- Location within Greece
- Coordinates: 35°20′40.7″N 25°8′12.66″E
- Area: 3,600 m^{2} (39,000 sq ft)

Site history
- Built: 1523–1540; 486 years ago
- Built by: Republic of Venice
- In use: 1580–20th century
- Materials: Limestone
- Battles/wars: Siege of Candia
- Events: Cretan War (1645–1669)

The Koules (Greek: Κούλες) or Castello a Mare ("Fort on the Sea" in Italian) is a fortress located at the entrance of the old port of Heraklion, Crete, Greece. It was built by the Republic of Venice in the early 16th century, and is still in good condition today.

== History ==
The site was possibly first fortified by the Arabs in the 9th or 10th centuries. By the second Byzantine period, a tower known as Castellum Comunis stood on the site. In 1303, the tower was destroyed in an earthquake but was repaired.

In 1462, the Venetian Senate approved a programme to improve the fortifications of Candia. Eventually, the Byzantine tower was demolished in 1523, and the Castello a Mare began to be built instead. Old ships were filled with stone, and were sunk to form a breakwater and increase the area of the platform on which the fortress was built. The fortress was completed in 1540.

In 1630, the fort was armed with 18 cannons on the ground floor, and 25 cannons on the pathway leading to the roof.

During the 21-year long Siege of Candia, Ottoman batteries easily neutralised the fort's firepower. The Ottomans eventually took the fort in 1669, after the Venetians surrendered the entire city. They did not make any major alterations to the fort, except for the additions of some battlements and embrasures. They built a small fort known as Little Koules on the landward side, but this was demolished in 1936 while the city was being "modernized".

During the period of Egyptian rule in Crete (1830–1840), a lighthouse was built on the north-eastern corner of Koule. In 1930, concrete pillars were added to the lighthouse. The lighthouse was destroyed in World War II but was rebuilt and continued to operate until 1960, when it was renovated and the concrete pillars were removed. The fortress has been restored, and it is now open to the public. Art exhibitions and cultural activities are occasionally held at the fort.

== Layout ==
The fortress is made up of two parts: a high rectangular section, and a slightly lower semi-elliptical section. Its walls are up to 8.7m thick at some places, and it has three entrances. The fort has two stories, with a total of 26 rooms, which were originally used as barracks, a prison, storage rooms, a water reservoir, a church, a mill and a bakery.

A lighthouse tower is located on the northern part of the fort.

== Gallery ==
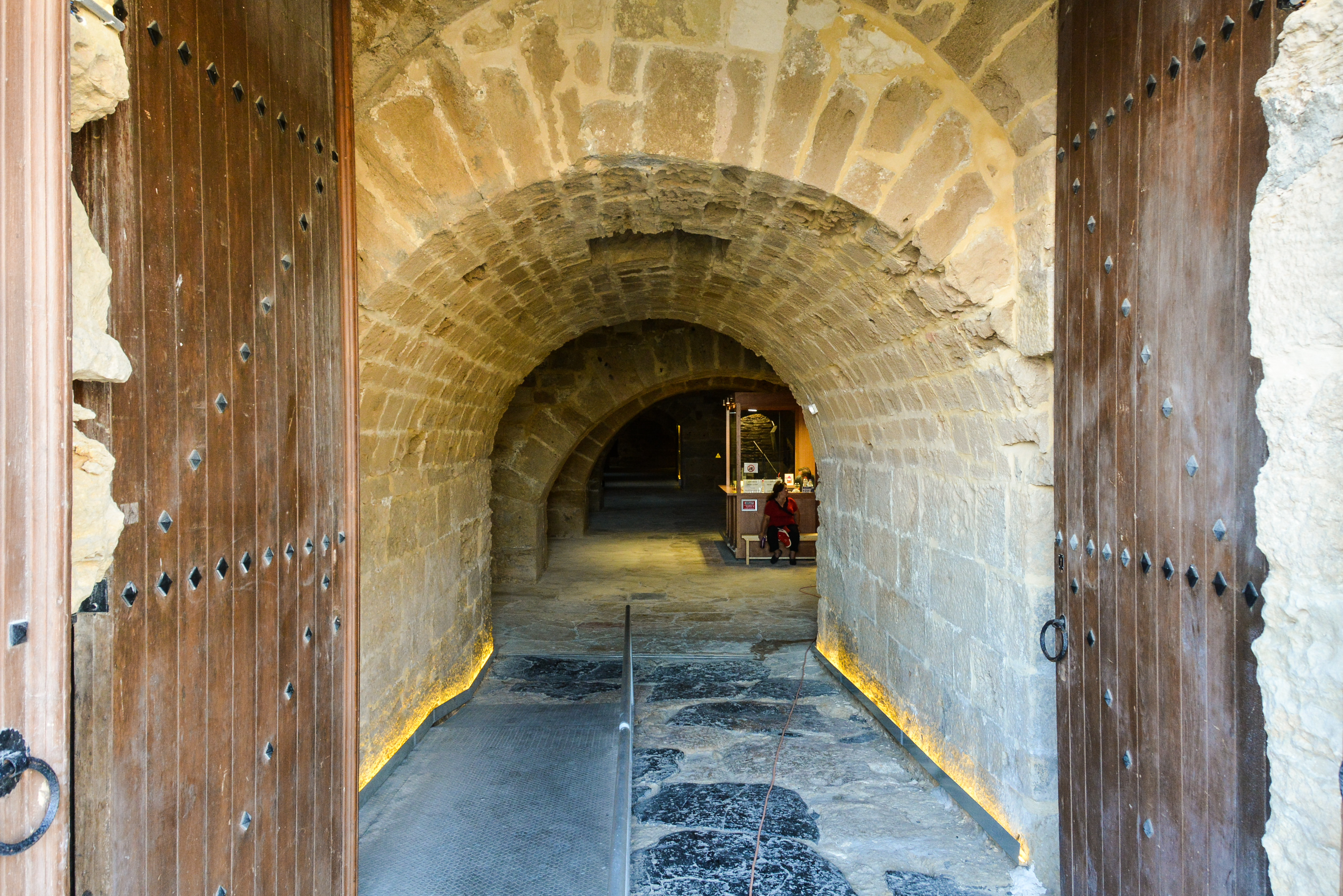
Entrance

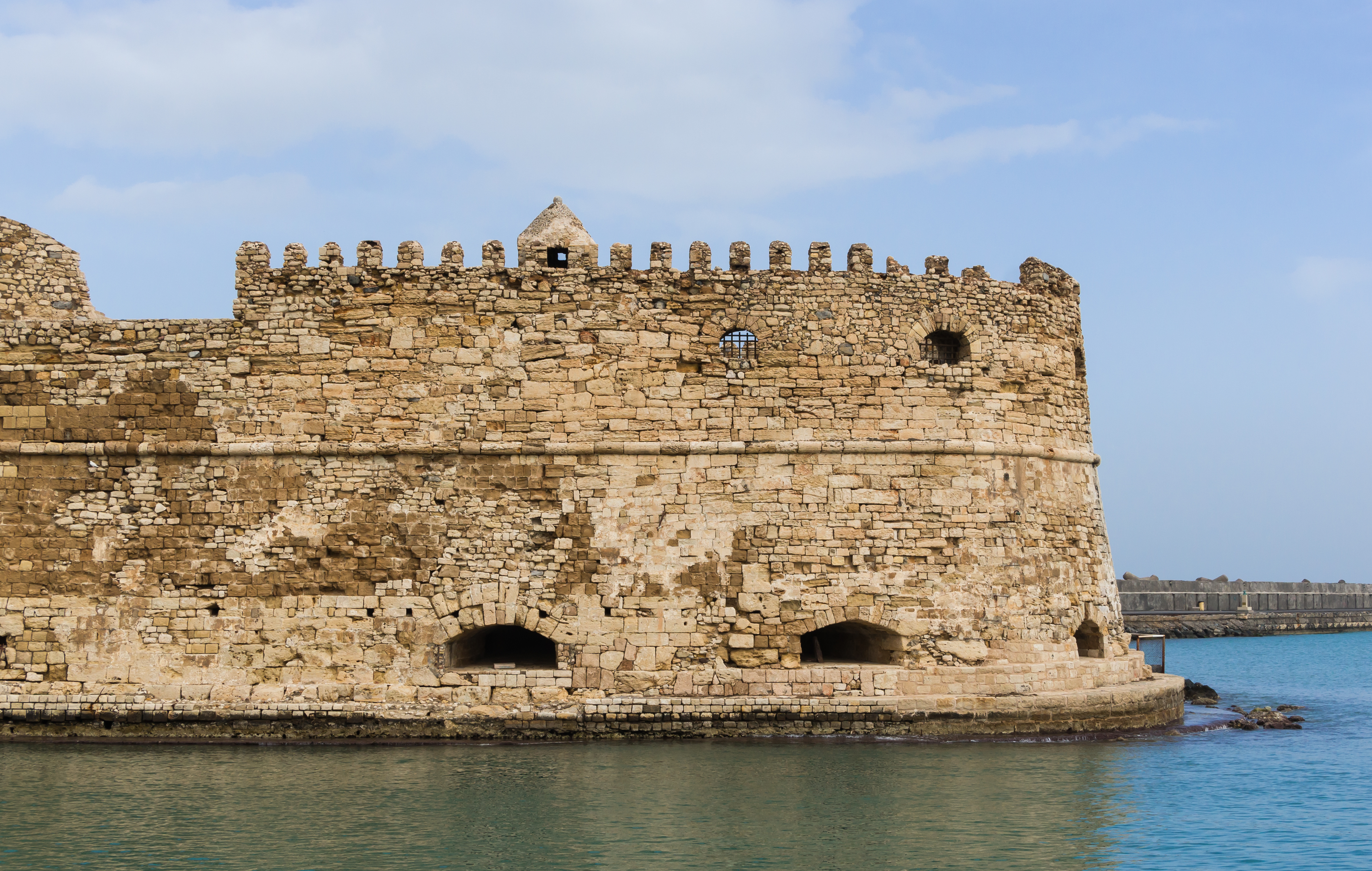
South wall

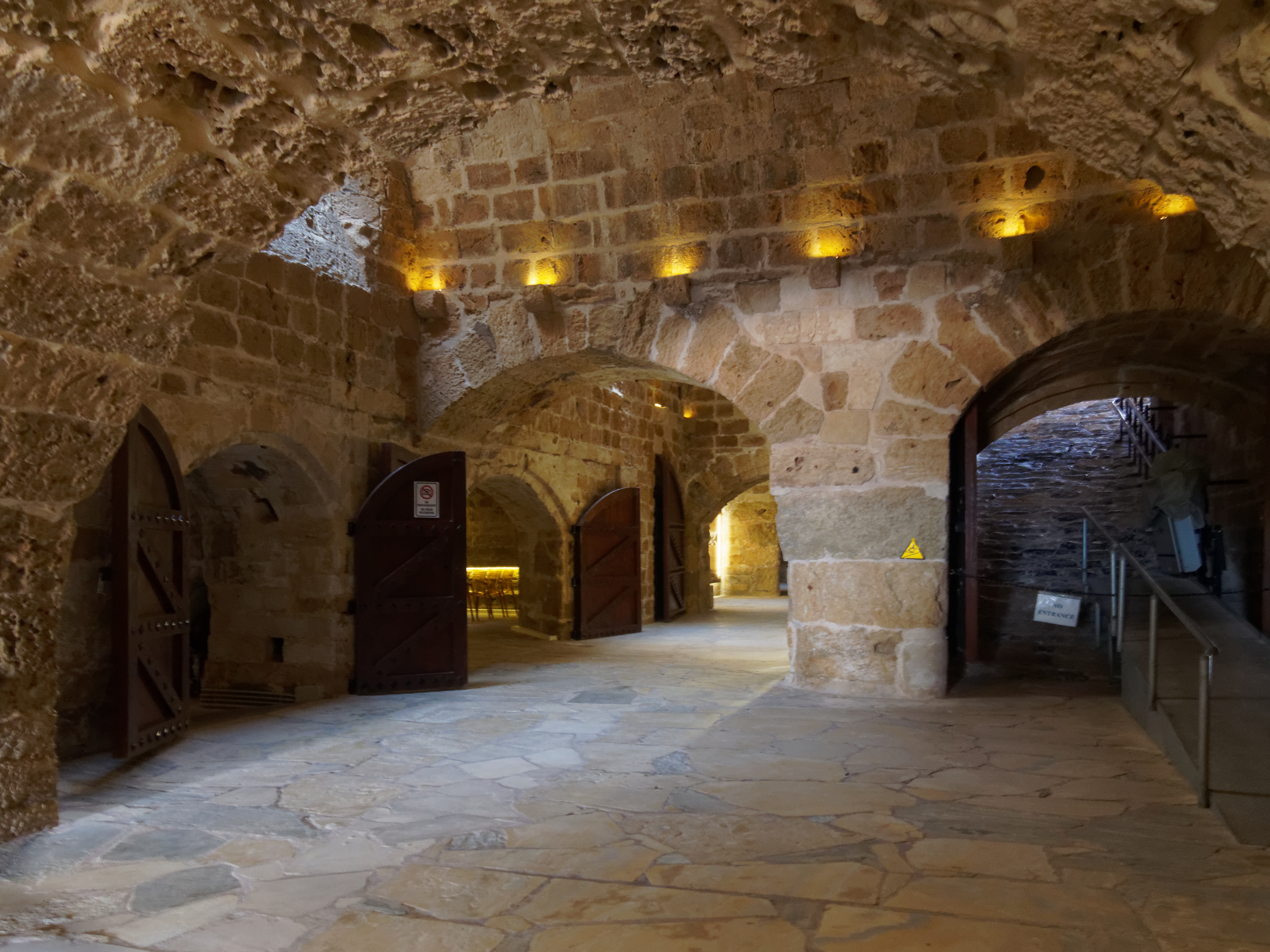
Interior view with the roof pathway on the right

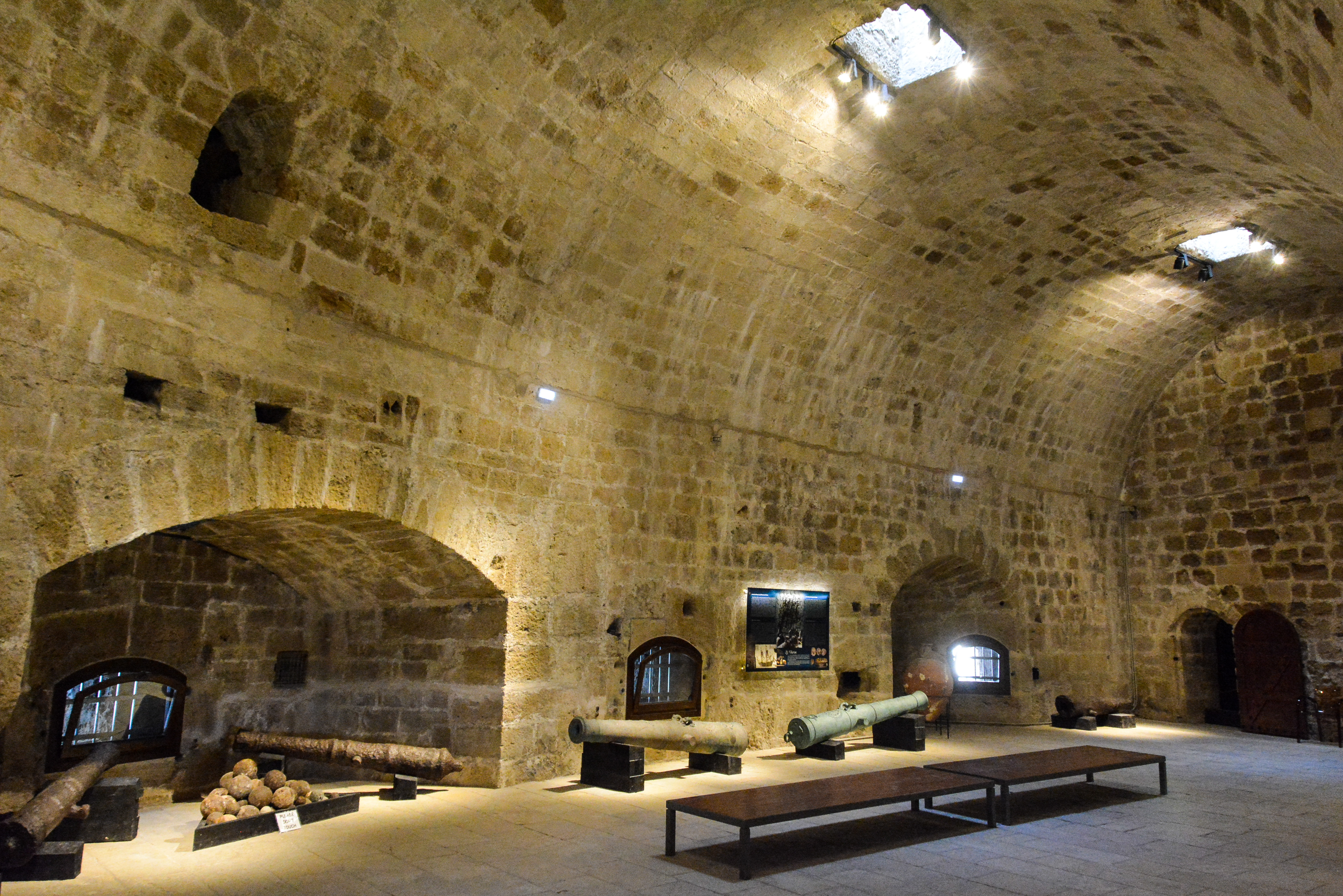
Interior view

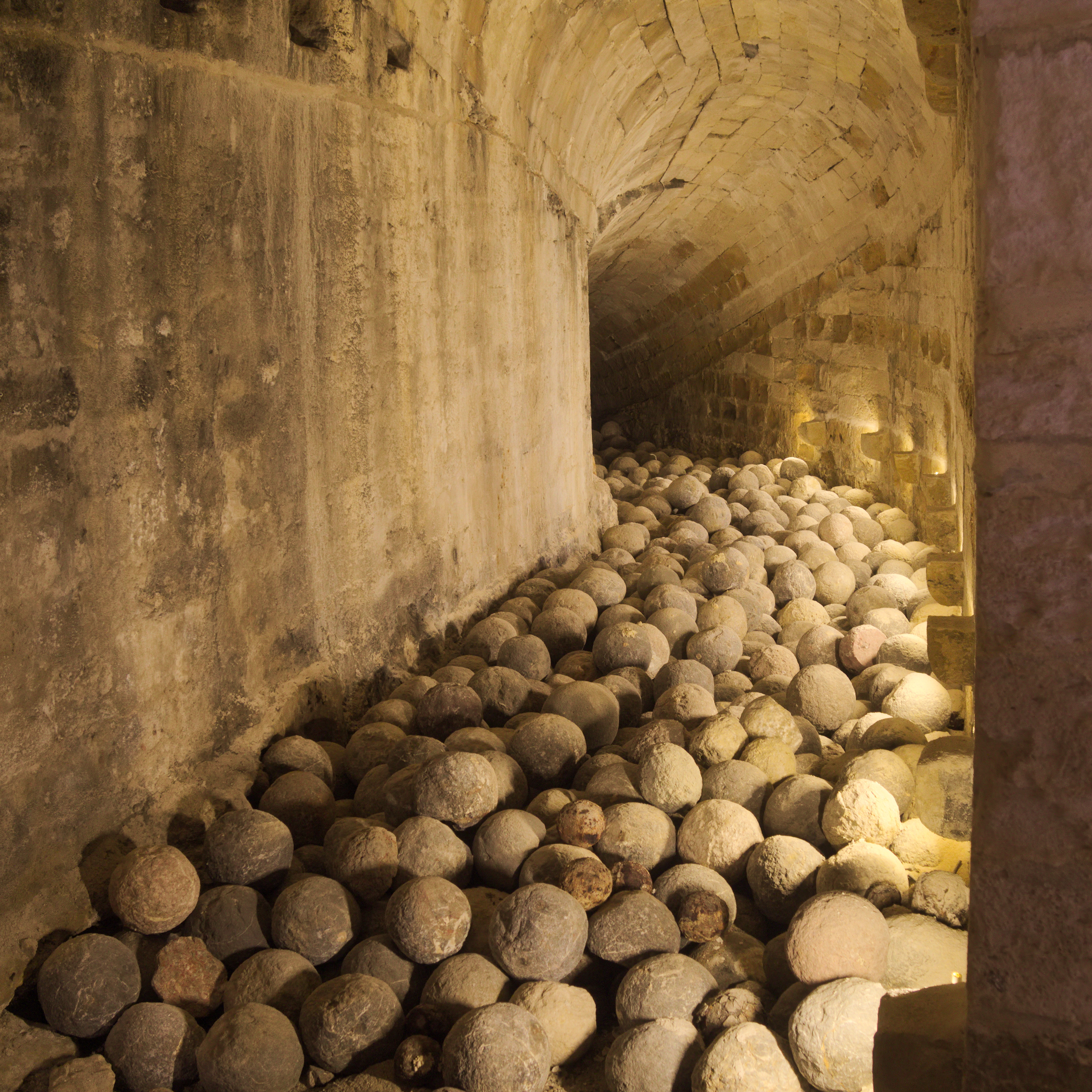
Cannonballs

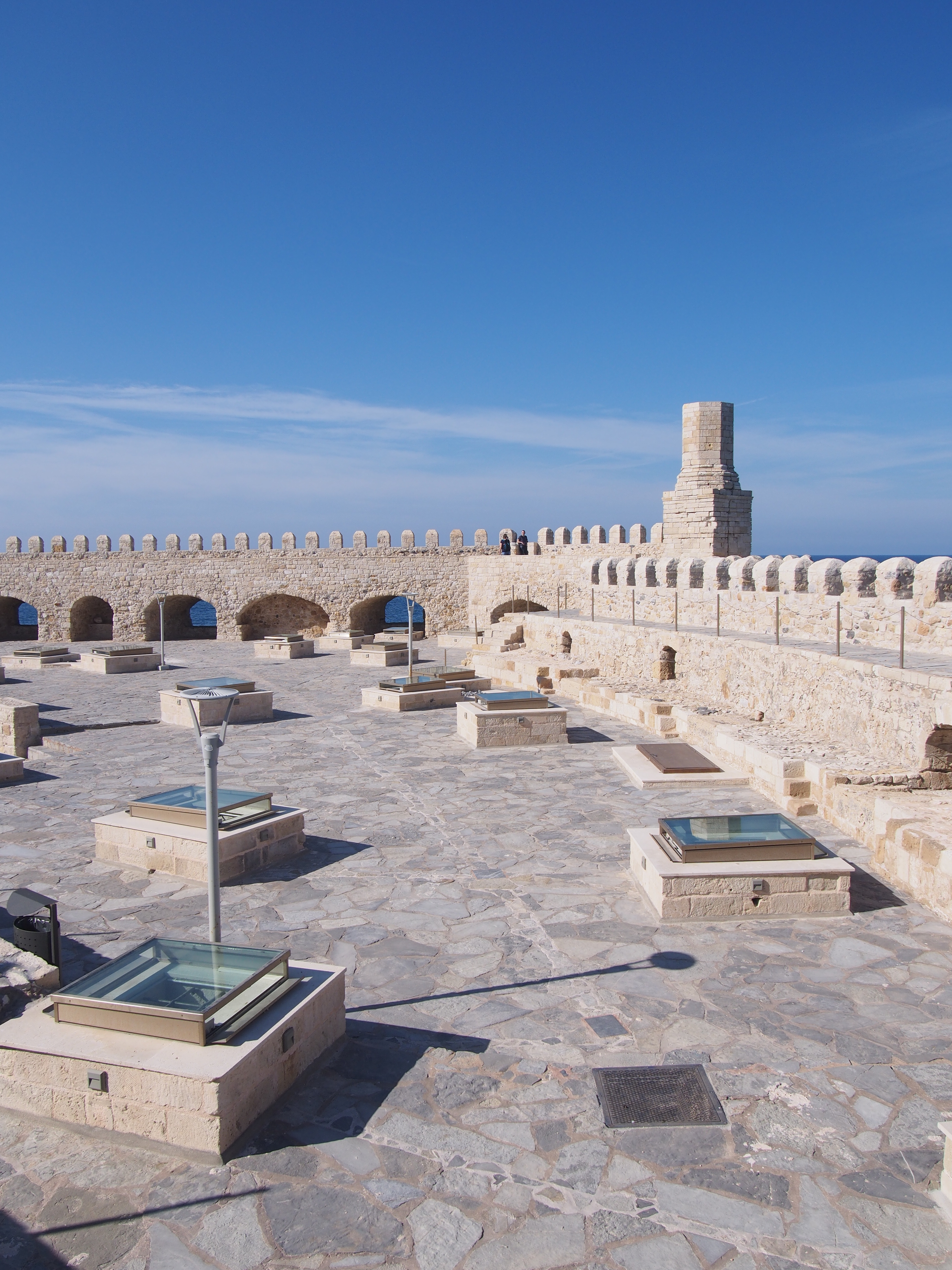
Roof view

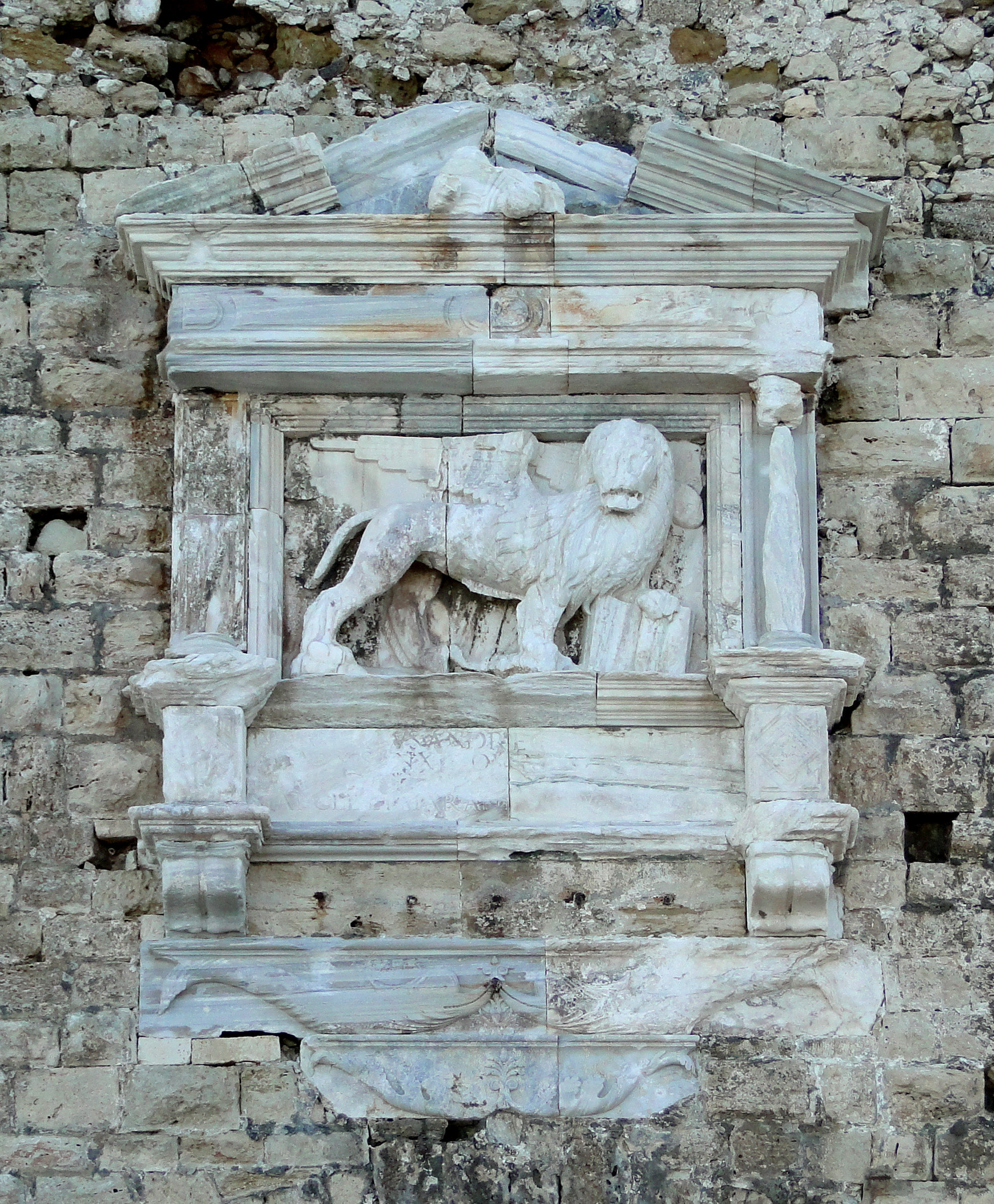
Relief of the winged Venetian lion on the north wall

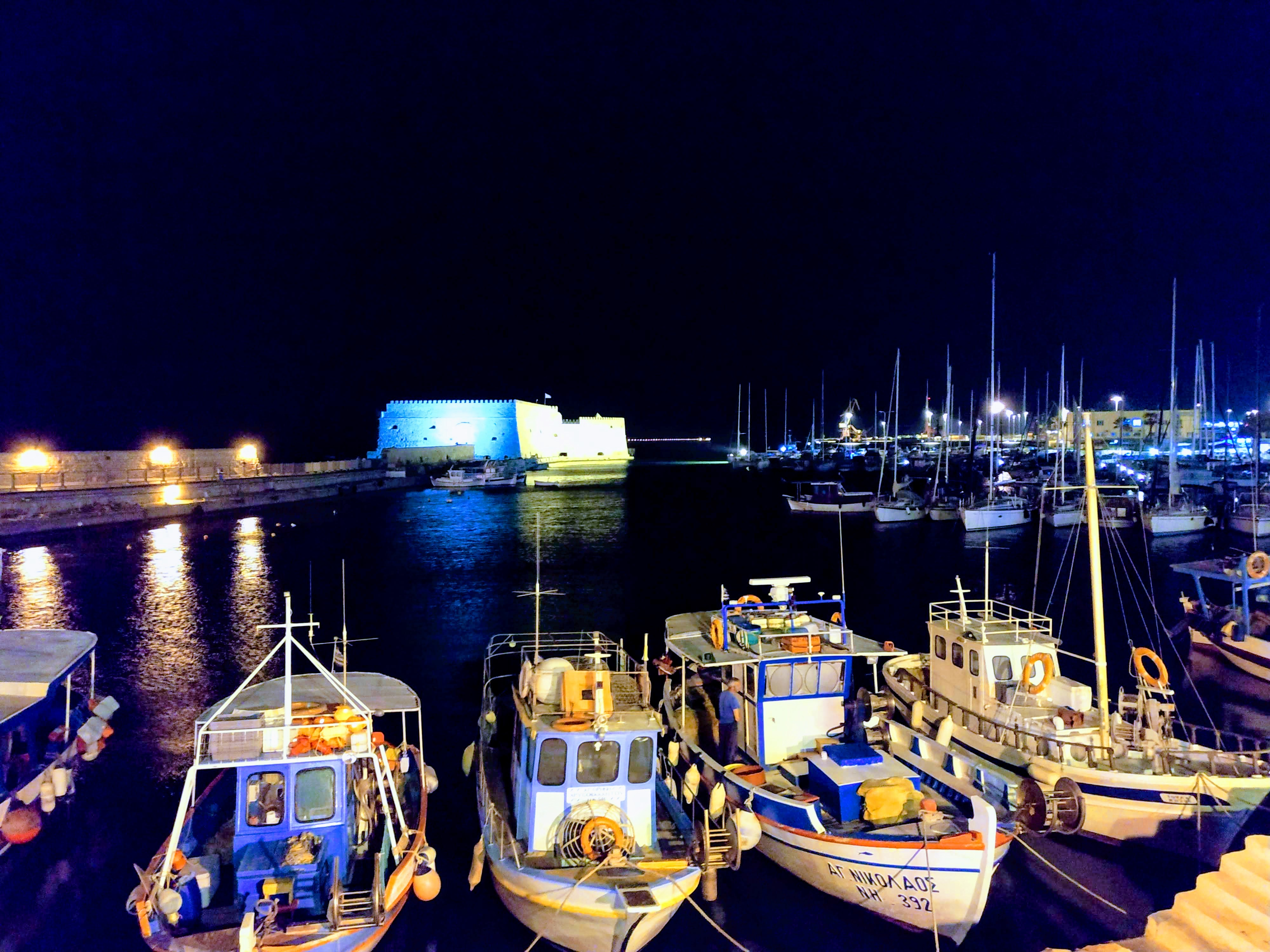
Koules by night
