= Aulon (Naxos) =

Aulon (Ancient Greek: Αὐλών) was a town of ancient Greece on the island of Naxos. It is cited in an inscription dated to the 3rd century BCE.

Its site is located on Naxos.
