= Aulon (Arcadia) =

Aulon (Ancient Greek: Αὐλών) was a town of ancient Arcadia mentioned by Stephanus of Byzantium.

Its site is unlocated.
