= Noel Cazenave =

American sociologist

- Born: Noel Anthony Cazenave; October 25, 1948 (age 77); Washington, D. C.
- Education: Dillard University; University of Michigan; Tulane University
- Spouse: Anita Washington (m. 1971)
- Children: Anika Tene Cazenave
- Scientific career
- Fields: Sociology
- Institutions: University of Connecticut
- Thesis: Middle-income Black fathers: Family interaction, transaction, and development (1977)

Noel Anthony Cazenave (born October 25, 1948) is a professor of sociology at the University of Connecticut. He generated controversy when he began teaching a "White Racism" course at the University of Connecticut in the 1990s. His initial proposal for the class in fall 1995 led to some of his critics comparing him to Leonard Jeffries and Louis Farrakhan. After heated debate among University of Connecticut faculty members, the class was offered for the first time in 1996. Shirlee Taylor Haizlip found out about the class because of the controversy it had generated, and subsequently spoke to its students as a guest lecturer. He is a member of the American Sociological Association, the Society for the Study of Social Problems, and the Association of Black Sociologists. In 2017, he was a co-organizer of the "Stand Up and Speak Out" campaign, which aims to defend progressive minority professors who have been attacked for their statements on racism.
