= Cazeneuve (company) =

- Founded: 1905 in Paris, France

The company A. Cazeneuve was founded in Paris by André Cazeneuve in 1905 and produced steel wool for grinding and cleaning floors. He had designed a specialized lathe to turn out the long, even and sharp chips needed for this purpose.

In 1920 the company was in dire straits economically. The technical director Henri Bruet took over ownership of the company in exchange for unpaid wages. He started manufacture of lathes of the series LO with overhead belt drive.

The son of Henri Bruet was also named Henri. He attended the École nationale supérieure d'arts et métiers, and became a mechanical engineer like his father. His diploma thesis was the design of the lathe HB, named after his own initials. This model came into production after Henri graduated, in 1949. The HB was revolutionary for its time. 40 000 machines were produced in the course of 50 years.

From 1959 to 1973 Cazeneuve also manufactured the HB series at its own factory in northern Tokyo. Approximately 6000 units were sold to Southeast Asian and American customers. This series was also made under license in Spain at the Amutio works.

From 1950 to 1964, Henri Bruet was granted a series of patents for mechanisms and assemblies for use in lathes. Many of these ideas were incorporated into the 360 HB-X (X for experimental) lathe. The machine featured a hydraulically actuated belt variator that allowed continuously variable spindle speed through a lever on the right side of the apron. The hydraulic pump also lubricated the spindle and feed gearboxes.

There was proper shielding of the operator from chuck contact, coolant and flying swarf. Both leadscrews ran in sealed oil baths. The apron was of a totally novel design. The leadscrew engaged with a worm wheel instead of the usual halfnuts. The apron gear system could engage every metric and imperial thread directly and automatically. The leadscrew could be disengaged for each cut without losing register. This made it easy to turn and thread directly against an endstop, even into blind holes. Accordingly, the lathe was equipped with an assortment of endstops both for the saddle and crossfeed. The endstop trip mechanism had a sensitive adjustment. There was a foot-operated emergency stop and spindle brake.

The tailstock was also of completely new design. The quill could be fed by three different methods: Rapidly by a large starwheel, by worm reduction via a smaller handwheel, or automatically by geared connection to the saddle. The transverse adjustment of the centre was done by an eccentric mechanism. The centre was protected from overload by a spring arrangement.

The Cazeneuve HBX 360 was marketed from 1965. Production of the first 50 units started at La Plaine St Denis and in Ruchon. From 1968 it was built at a new, dedicated factory at Pont Évêque.

Around the same time (in 1967) the Japanese Cazeneuve factory in Osaka (Osaka Kosakucho) began manufacturing the HBX 360 for the Japanese market, about 50 units per month. This production lasted until 1976, and from 1970 they also produced the larger but similar model HBY 590 there.

Due to high demand on the French domestic market around 1968, about 200 HBX lathes were imported from Japan between 1968 and 1969. These machines differ from the French model in some details, particularly the electrical equipment and motor. The HBX 360 was also made under license in Brazil for the local market.

Henri Bruet became very debilitated by Parkinson's disease. He left his position as technical director at Cazeneuve in 1972. In 1983 the company went through bankruptcy, and was bought and restructured by the CATO group. Henri Bruet died in 1992. The HBX 360 was still offered in its original, manual form with only cosmetic updates until 2008.
