= Salmacis (Caria) =

Town of ancient Caria

Salmacis or Salmakis (Ancient Greek: Σαλμακίς) was a town of ancient Caria. While the famed fountain appears in Strabo, the town is only mentioned in inscriptions. It was a polis (city-state) and a member of the Delian League.

Its site is unlocated.
