= Castle of Cuppa =

Medieval fortress on the Greek island of Euboea

Coordinates: 38°32′36″N 24°02′20″E

The Castle of Cuppa (Greek: Κάστρο Κούπα) is a medieval fortress in the centre of the Greek island of Euboea.

== Location ==
Cuppa is located on Mount Mavrovouni, southwest of the village of Vrysi.

== History ==
The castle, situated in the district of la Vallona and named after nearby Avlonari, is first mentioned in the 13th century, in the battles between Byzantines and the Lombard lords of Euboea. It was captured in 1269 by the Byzantine commander Licario, recovered by the Franks three years later, and may have been recaptured by the Byzantines in 1276.

In the 15th century, it was the residence of the two local Venetian captains of the district of Avlonari (capitanei Avalone); later one of the two resided in the nearby Potiri Castle. The castle was conquered in 1470 by the Ottoman Empire, during which time reportedly 3,000 local Christians were killed.

== Remains ==
A large part of the fortifications, including the castle keep, survived until the 19th century but have since disappeared, leaving only remains of a wall incorporating ancient spolia. Nearby is a hagiasma in a cave, still being used as a chapel, with traces of ancient and medieval structures.
