= Aulon (Attica) =

Aulon (Ancient Greek: Αὐλών) was a settlement in ancient Attica, located near the Mines of Laurium. Its site is unlocated.
