= Cazeneuve-Montaut =

- Commune
- Location of Cazeneuve-Montaut
- Location within France Location within Occitanie
- Coordinates: 43°11′02″N 0°51′31″E
- Country: France
- Region: Occitania
- Department: Haute-Garonne
- Arrondissement: Saint-Gaudens
- Canton: Cazères
- Intercommunality: Cœur et Coteaux du Comminges

Government
  - Mayor (2020–2026): Christian Tesser
- Area^{1}: 4.59 km^{2} (1.77 sq mi)
- Elevation: 365 m (1,198 ft)
- Highest elevation: 422 m (1,385 ft)
- Lowest elevation: 312 m (1,024 ft)
- Population (2023): 82
  - Density: 18/km^{2} (46/sq mi)
- Time zone: UTC+01:00 (CET)
  - Summer (DST): UTC+02:00 (CEST)
- INSEE/Postal code: 31134 /31420
- ^{1} French Land Register data, which excludes lakes, ponds, glaciers > 1 km^{2} (0.386 sq mi or 247 acres) and river estuaries.

Cazeneuve-Montaut (French pronunciation: [kaznœv mɔ̃to]; Occitan: Casanava de Montaut) is a commune in the Haute-Garonne department in southwestern France.

== Population ==
Historical population
Year	Pop.	±% p.a.
1968	71	—
1975	56	−3.33%
1982	54	−0.52%
1990	58	+0.90%
1999	54	−0.79%
2007	57	+0.68%
2012	71	+4.49%
2017	74	+0.83%
2023	82	+1.73%
Source: INSEE

== See also ==
- Communes of the Haute-Garonne department
