= Aulon, Haute-Garonne =

Aulon
- Commune
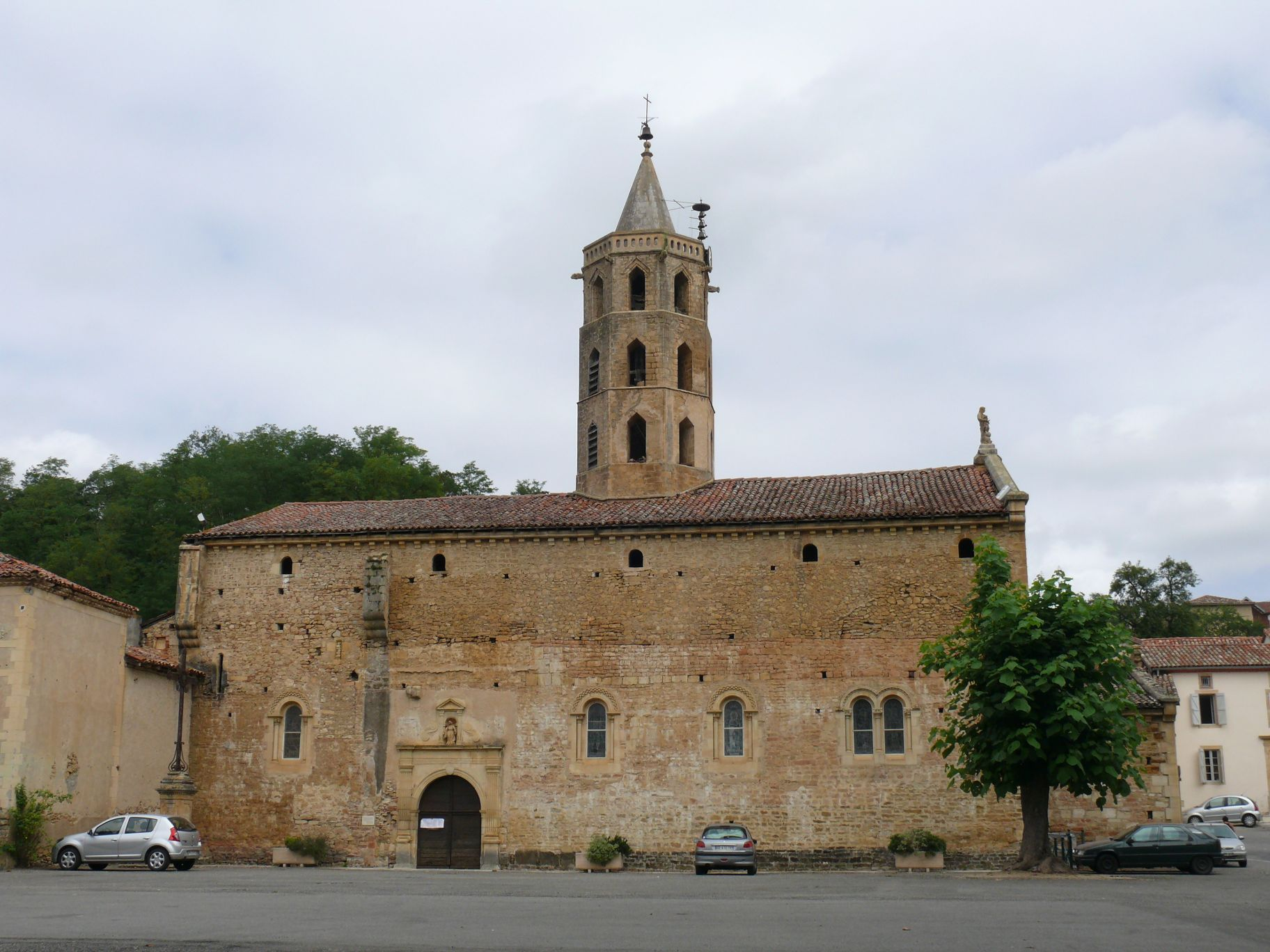
- The church in Aulon
- Location of Aulon
- Location within France Location within Occitanie
- Coordinates: 43°11′32″N 0°49′14″E
- Country: France
- Region: Occitania
- Department: Haute-Garonne
- Arrondissement: Saint-Gaudens
- Canton: Cazères
- Intercommunality: CC Cœur Coteaux Comminges

Government
  - Mayor (2020–2026): Jean-Claude Durroux
- Area^{1}: 14.90 km^{2} (5.75 sq mi)
- Elevation: 310 m (1,020 ft)
- Highest elevation: 483 m (1,585 ft)
- Lowest elevation: 312 m (1,024 ft)
- Population (2023): 313
  - Density: 21.0/km^{2} (54.4/sq mi)
- Time zone: UTC+01:00 (CET)
  - Summer (DST): UTC+02:00 (CEST)
- INSEE/Postal code: 31023 /31420
- ^{1} French Land Register data, which excludes lakes, ponds, glaciers > 1 km^{2} (0.386 sq mi or 247 acres) and river estuaries.

Aulon (French pronunciation: [olɔ̃]) is a commune in the Haute-Garonne department in southwestern France.

== Population ==
Historical population
Year	Pop.	±% p.a.
1968	505	—
1975	488	−0.49%
1982	466	−0.66%
1990	434	−0.89%
1999	347	−2.46%
2007	347	+0.00%
2012	364	+0.96%
2017	309	−3.22%
2023	313	+0.21%
Source: INSEE

== See also ==
- Communes of the Haute-Garonne department
