= Amarysia (festival) =

Ancient Greek Festival

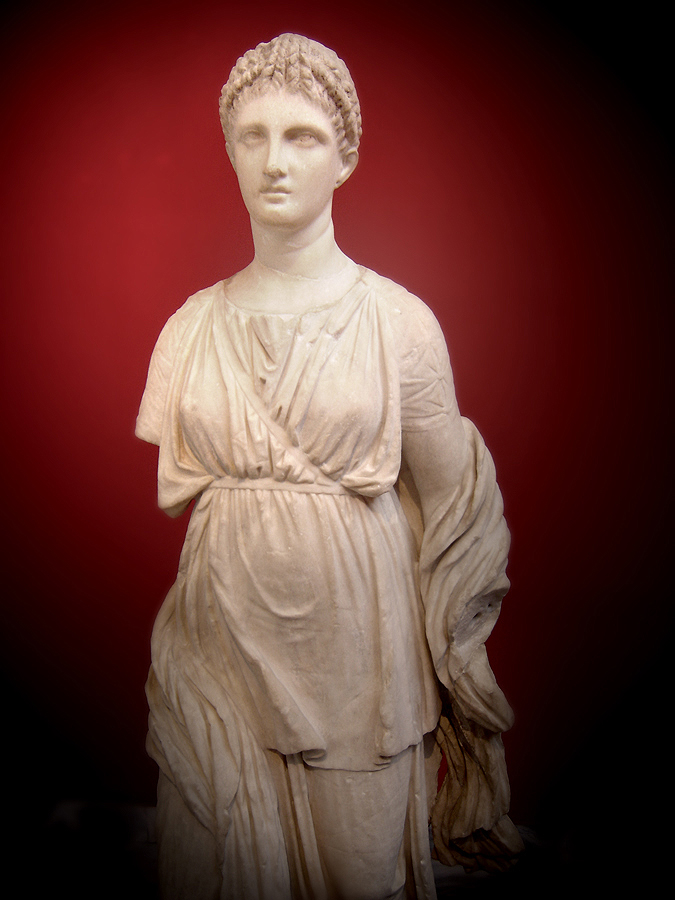
Artemis Diadoumena. National Archaeological Museum in Athens.

The Amarynthia, later known as Amarysia (in Greek Αμαρύσια), was an ancient Greek festival held in honor of Artemis. It was originally celebrated in Amarynthos, Euboea, with the participation of people from Eretria and Karystos, and later in Attica, specifically in the deme of Athmonun.

During the festival, the Eretrians would form a procession from their city to the sanctuary of Amarynthian Artemis, where they would sacrifice rams. The celebrations included musical, athletic, and dramatic competitions. Strabo records that a pillar in that temple bore an inscription detailing that the Eretrians once conducted a festival procession comprising 3,000 hoplites, 600 cavalrymen, and 60 chariots.

The festival was later transferred to the Attic deme of Athmonon in honor of Amarysia Artemis, under the name Amarysia. The modern name of the area, Marousi (Amarousion), is derived from this festival.

Athletes from across Greece participated in the Amarysia, and the victors were awarded gold prizes. On the same day, officials who had governed the deme effectively were also honored.

== Bibliography ==
- Smith, William (1890). Wayte, William; Marindin, G. E. (eds.). A Dictionary of Greek and Roman Antiquities. Albemarle Street, London: John Murray.
- Pausanias. "1.31.5". Description of Greece.
- Peck, Harry Thurston (1898). "Amarynthia". Harpers Dictionary of Classical Antiquities.
- Strabo. "10.1". Geography.
