= Messapian =

Messapian may refer to:

- Messapians, an Iapygian tribe which inhabited Apulia in classical antiquity
- Messapian language, spoken by the Iapygian tribes
- An inhabitant of Messapia, Greece
