= Stellaria biflora =

Stellaria biflora is a botanical synonym of three species of plant:

- Cherleria biflora, synonym published in 1753 by Carl Linnaeus
- Moehringia ciliata, synonym published in 1797 by Nicolaus Thomas Host
- Moehringia lateriflora, synonym published in 1813 by Frederick Traugott Pursh
