= Cherleria dirphya =

Conservation status
- Critically Endangered (IUCN 3.1)

Scientific classification
- Kingdom: Plantae
- Clade: Tracheophytes
- Clade: Angiosperms
- Clade: Eudicots
- Order: Caryophyllales
- Family: Caryophyllaceae
- Genus: Cherleria
- Species: C. dirphya

Binomial name
- Cherleria dirphya (Trigas & Iatroú) A.J.Moore & Dillenb. (2017)

Synonyms
- Minuartia dirphya Trigas & Iatroú (2005)

Species of flowering plant

Cherleria dirphya is a rare species of plant in the family Caryophyllaceae. It is endemic to Mt. Dirfi on Evvia in Greece. It is restricted to the higher peaks of this single mountain on an island with many endemic plant species. Its natural habitat is Mediterranean-type shrubby vegetation. It is threatened by habitat loss.

== Description ==
Minuartia dirphya is a hairless perennial herb that grows in loose, tufted clumps from a woody base. It produces two distinct stem types: short, non-flowering shoots up to 4.5 cm long bearing dense bundles (fascicles) of straight, rigid, narrow leaves 4–9 mm long with three prominent veins, and taller flowering stems 4–16 cm long that lack leaf bundles and carry 8–14 pairs of similar leaves which decrease in length toward the tip. On flowering stems, leaves below the midpoint measure 3.5–11.0 mm—up to twice as long as the stem segments (internodes)—while those above measure 1.8–7.0 mm, up to two-thirds as long as the internodes.

The loose flower cluster (inflorescence) bears one to eleven flowers on slender stalks (pedicels) 1.5–8 mm long. Each flower has five green sepals, 2.6–5.0 mm long and distinctly three-veined with narrow translucent margins, and five white petals, 1.8–3.8 mm long, narrowly elliptic to almost linear and equal to or shorter than the sepals. The stamens arise from a fleshy green disc at the base of the ovary and carry anthers that range in colour from creamy-pink to dark purple. Fruits are oblong-ovoid capsules 3.6–5.5 mm long—slightly longer than the sepals—and contain up to four brown, triangular-kidney-shaped (reniform) seeds 1.5–1.9 mm long; the seed surface bears small bumps (papillae) chiefly along the dorsal ridge.

== Taxonomy ==
Minuartia dirphya was validly published in 2005 based on material collected from the northern slopes of mount Dirfi, Euboea, Greece. It is placed in Minuartia sect. Spectabiles, subsect. Laricifoliae, ser. Laricifoliae. The species epithet name the mountain, the only locality where this taxon occurs, at 900–1,000 m elevation on serpentine outcrops. The holotype is preserved at the herbarium of the University of Patras (Trigas & Iatrou 2998) and the diagnosis contrasts M. dirphya with its close relatives by a combination of glabrous stems, narrowly elliptic petals 0.5–1.0 times the length of the sepals, and triangular-reniform seeds papillose chiefly on the dorsal ridge. The taxon was transferred to the genus Cherleria in 2017.
