= Olimpo =

Olimpo may refer to:

- Olimpo de Bahía Blanca, Argentine sports club located in Bahía Blanca, Argentina
- Olympus (Euboea), name for Mount Olympus
- Olympos, Larissa, municipality in Greece

== See also ==
- Fuerte Olimpo, city in Paraguay
