= Kamaritsa =

Kamaritsa (Greek: Καμαρίτσα) may refer to two places in Greece:

- Kamaritsa, Arcadia, a settlement of Falaisia in Arcadia
- Kamaritsa, Euboea, a settlement in the municipality Dirfys–Messapia, Euboea
