= Loutsa =

Loutsa (Greek Λούτσα, plural Loutses) may refer to the following places in Greece:

- Loutsa, old name of Artemida, East Attica
- Loutsa, Euboea, a settlement in the municipal unit of Dirfys, Euboea
- Loutsa, Preveza, a community of Fanari, Preveza regional unit
- Loutses, a village in the municipal unit of Thinali, Corfu
