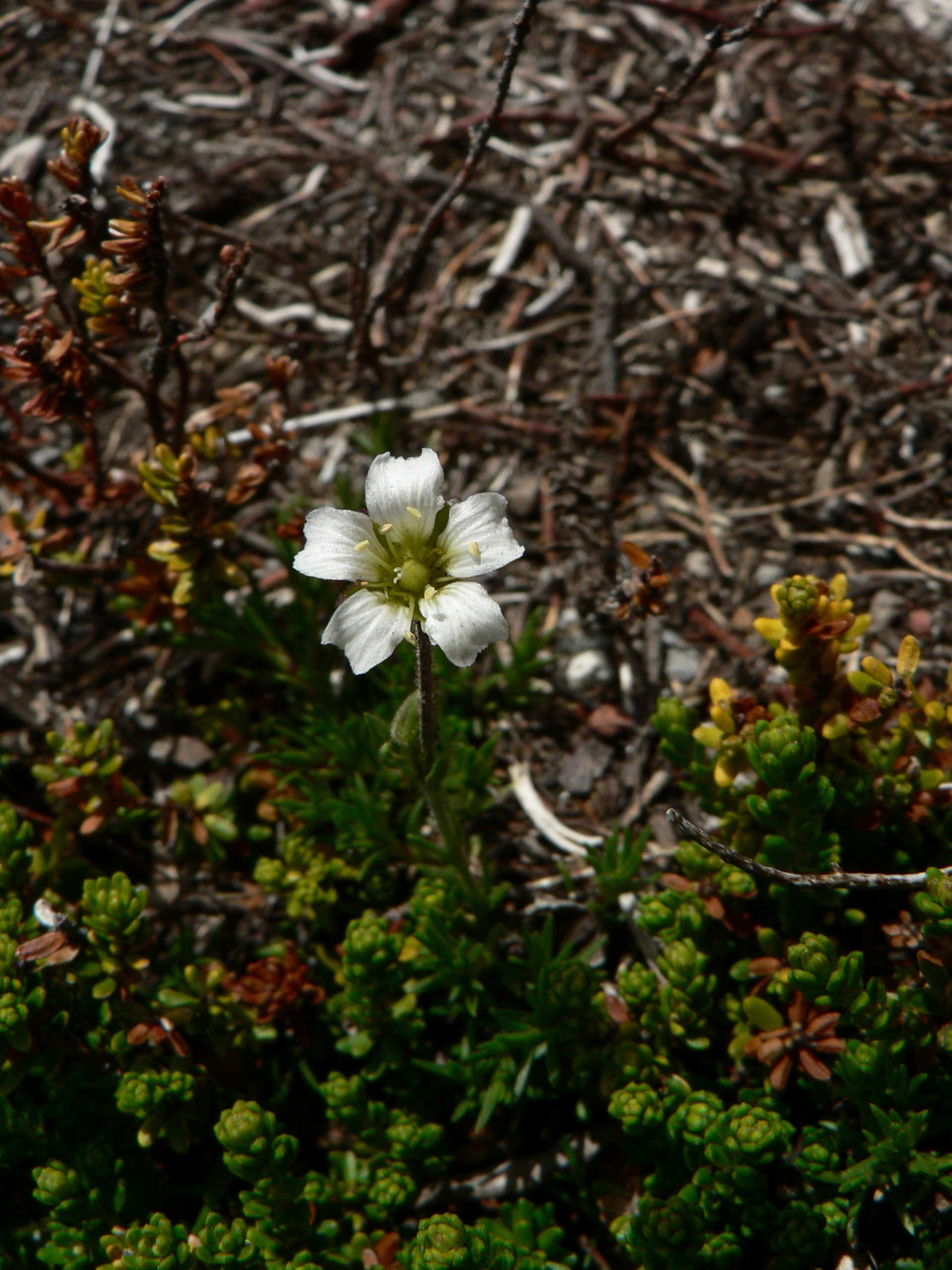

Conservation status
- Secure (NatureServe)

Scientific classification
- Kingdom: Plantae
- Clade: Tracheophytes
- Clade: Angiosperms
- Clade: Eudicots
- Order: Caryophyllales
- Family: Caryophyllaceae
- Genus: Cherleria
- Species: C. obtusiloba

Binomial name
- Cherleria obtusiloba (Rydb.) A.J.Moore & Dillenb.

Synonyms
- List: Alsinopsis obtusiloba; Arenaria biflora var. obtusa; Arenaria obtusa; Arenaria obtusiloba; Lidia obtusiloba; Minuartia obtusa; Minuartia obtusiloba

= Cherleria obtusiloba =

Plant species in the carnation family

Cherleria obtusiloba is a perennial alpine herb known by the common names alpine sandwort and twinflower stitchwort. It is native to the mountains of western North America from the High Sierra of California to the Colorado Rockies north to Alaska, and to far northeastern Russia (Magadan, Kamchatka, and Yakutia). This is a low plant forming mats or clumps and bearing small thimble-shaped flowers with curving white petals.

== Description ==
Alpine sandwort is a perennial plant that forms a tuft or mat of low growing stems, reaching just 12 centimeters (4.7 in) at most, and often just 1 to 5 cm to hug the ground. They have a thick and woody taproot and form a mat as much as 40 cm (16 in) across. Their flowerless stems grow along the ground can be as short as 2 cm or more than 20 cm and branch. The flowering stems grow upwards, though they sometimes rest on the ground at their base.

On non-flowering stems the leaves tightly overlap while on the flowering stems they are spaced variably. The leaves are thin and needle like to subulate in shape and can be straight or curve outward. They measure just 1–8 millimeters long with a width of 0.4–1 mm. Towards the base they are fused and have a tight sheath measuring 0.3–1.5 mm that can be dry and paper-like or herbaceous.

The fruit is a capsule measuring 3.5–6 mm long. They are narrowly egg-shaped or else ellipsoid with three valved openings. Each capsule contains several comma shaped red-brown to brown seeds. They measure 0.6–0.8 mm.

== Taxonomy ==
Cherleria obtusiloba was described as a species named Arenaria obtusa in 1827 by botanist John Torrey. However, this name had previously been used in 1785 by Carlo Allioni to describe what was later accepted as Moehringia ciliata, making it an illegitimate name. It was described as a species again in 1906 by Per Axel Rydberg, but using the name Alsinopsis obtusiloba. This was followed by Homer Doliver House moving it to Minuartia in 1921 and finally to Cherleria by Abigail J. Moore and Markus S. Dillenberger in 2017 to give the species its accepted name according to Plants of the World Online, World Plants, and the Database of Vascular Plants of Canada (VASCAN). The older name Minuartia obtusiloba continues to appear in the Flora of North America, the USDA Natural Resources Conservation Service plants database, and in the NatureServe conservation evaluation.

It has no accepted forms, but has 8 synonyms.

Table of Synonyms
Name	Year	Rank	Notes
Alsinopsis obtusiloba Rydb.	1906	species	≡ hom.
Arenaria biflora var. obtusa S.Watson	1878	variety	≡ hom.
Arenaria obtusa Torr.	1827	species	≡ hom., nom. illeg.
Arenaria obtusiloba (Rydb.) Fernald	1919	species	≡ hom.
Arenaria obtusiloba f. rosea A.E.Porsild	1939	form	= het.
Lidia obtusiloba (Rydb.) Á.Löve & D.Löve	1975	species	≡ hom.
Minuartia obtusa Mattf.	1921	species	≡ hom., nom. superfl.
Minuartia obtusiloba (Rydb.) House	1921	species	≡ hom.
Notes: ≡ homotypic synonym; = heterotypic synonym

=== Names ===
The species name, obtusiloba, means "blunt-lobed". It is known by the common names alpine sandwort, alpine stichwort, twinflower sandwort, and twin-flower sandwort.

== Ecology ==
C. Obtusiloba is a gynodioecious perennial which is a sexually dimorphic breeding system in which females (F, male sterile) and hermaphrodites (H) coexist in the same population.

It is a member of the Caryophyllaceae family, which share flower and pollination traits within members of the family. Plants in the Caryophyllaceae family can have anywhere from one to ten stamen on a single flower. The ovary consists of multiple styles that are not fused together, and can have two to five carpels.

C. obtusiloba cannot vegetatively reproduce and therefore must rely entirely on sexual reproduction to maintain its population. As an alpine cushion plant, C. Obtusiloba has slow growth rates because of the harsh environmental conditions and does not reproduce until it is at least 123 cm^2, which can take up to several decades. In fact, according to various studies, Minuartia is one of the longest-lived forbs whose longevity has been estimated with a lifespan of up to 200 years.
