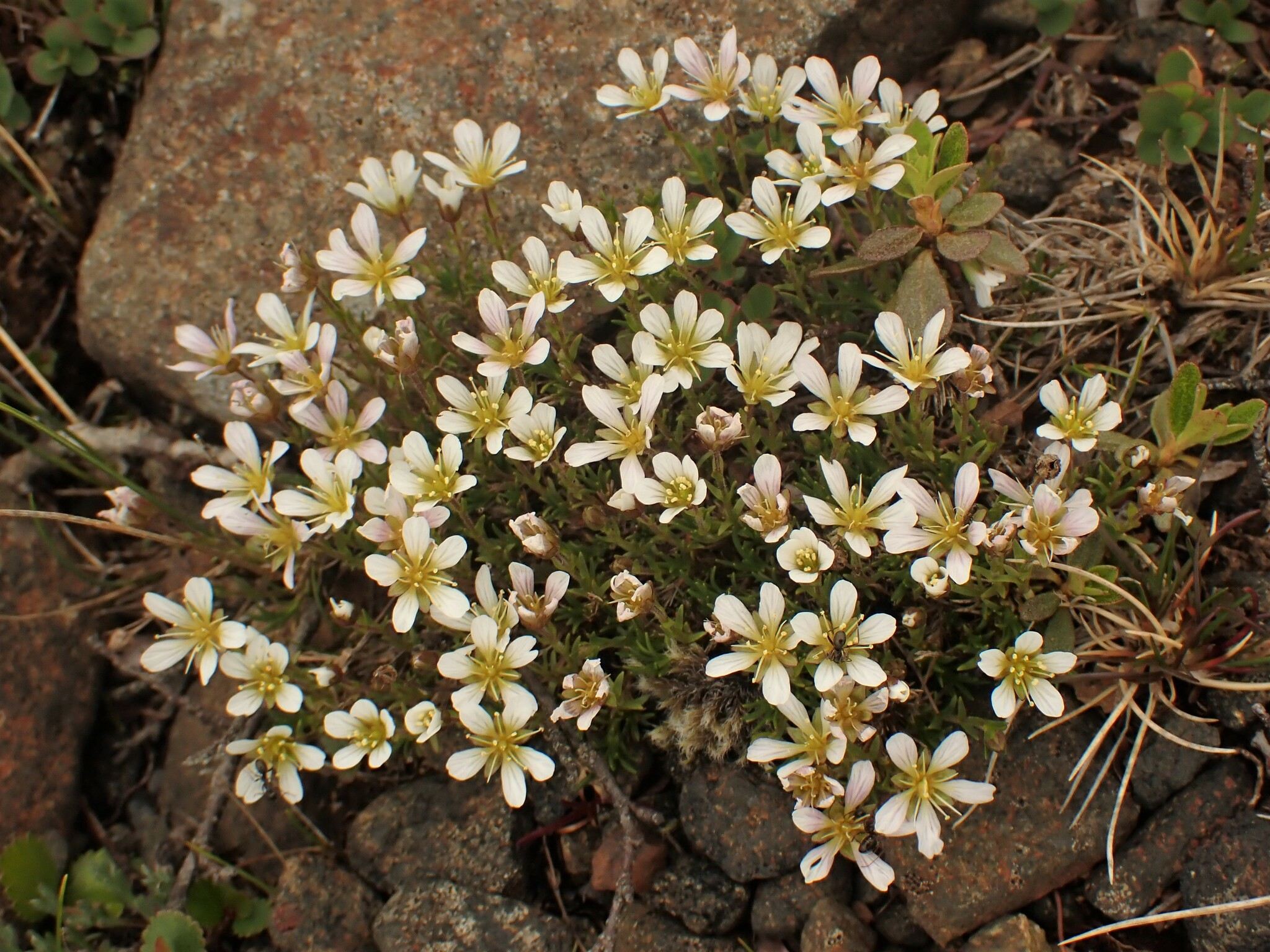

Conservation status
- Vulnerable (NatureServe)

Scientific classification
- Kingdom: Plantae
- Clade: Embryophytes
- Clade: Tracheophytes
- Clade: Spermatophytes
- Clade: Angiosperms
- Clade: Eudicots
- Order: Caryophyllales
- Family: Caryophyllaceae
- Genus: Cherleria
- Species: C. marcescens

Binomial name
- Cherleria marcescens (Fernald) A.J. Moore & Dillenb.

Synonyms
- Arenaria marcescens Fernald; Minuartia marcescens (Fernald) House

= Cherleria marcescens =

Species of plant native to North America

Cherleria marcescens, the serpentine stitchwort or minuartie de la serpentine, is a perennial herbaceous plant found growing in the barren rocky serpentine habitats of Quebec, Newfoundland, and Vermont. The name marcescens refers to the characteristic of the plant in which the leaves die and turn brown but remain attached. Cherleria marcescens was first described as Arenaria marcescens by M. L. Fernald in 1906. It was subsequently transferred to the genus Minuartia by Homer Doliver House in 1921 and to Cherleria by Moore & Dillenberger in 2017.
