= Steni Dirfyos =

Steni Dirfyos Στενή Δίρφυος
- Community
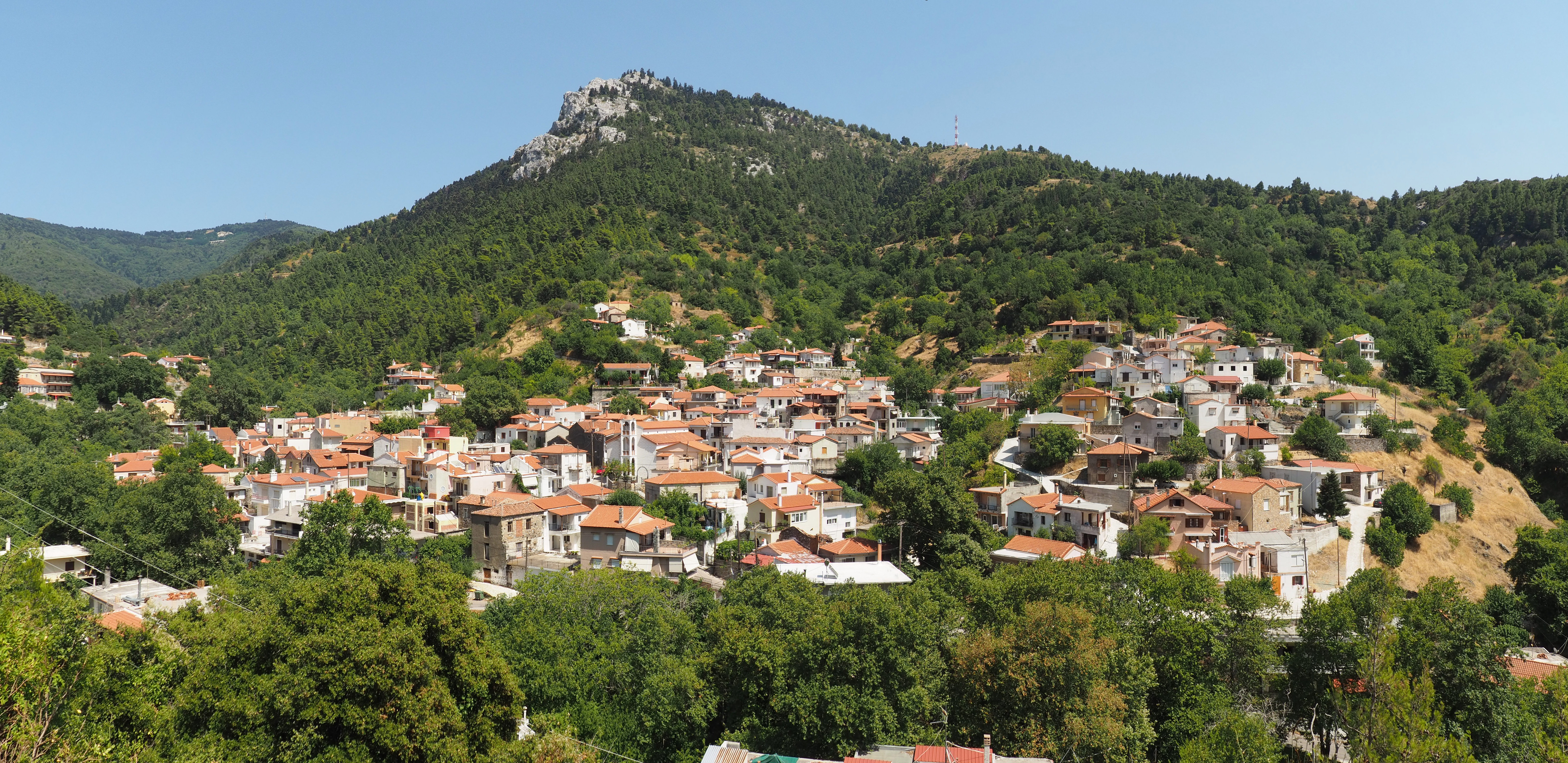

- Location within Greece
- Coordinates: 38°35′N 23°49′E
- Country: Greece
- Administrative region: Central Greece
- Regional unit: Euboea
- Municipality: Dirfys-Messapia
- Municipal unit: Dirfys

Population (2021)
  - Community: 565
- Time zone: UTC+2 (EET)
  - Summer (DST): UTC+3 (EEST)
- Vehicle registration: ΧΑ

Steni Dirfyos (Greek: Στενή Δίρφυος) formerly Ano Steni is a village on Euboea island, Greece. It is nearly located in the centre of Euboea, 30 km northeast of Chalcis. It lies at a height of 440 m. in the slopes of mount Dirfys. Steni is part of Dirfys-Messapia municipality and is the seat of Dirfys regional unit.

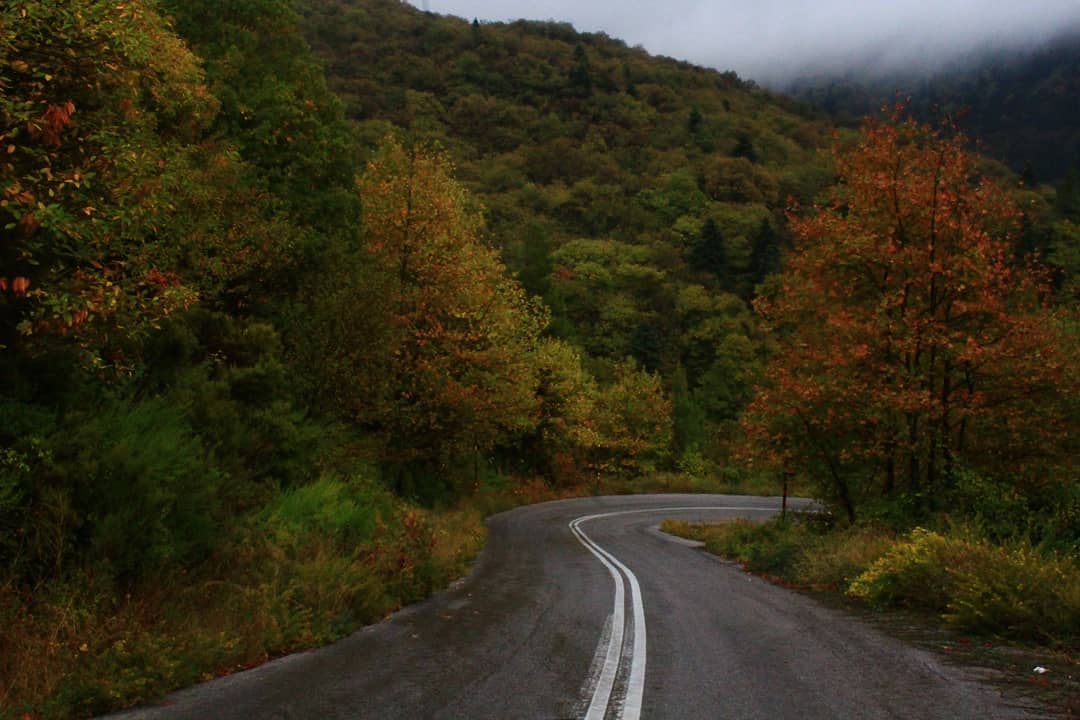
Steni Forest

== History ==
Steni is built in the late 18th century (at about in 1790) by inhabitants of village Skounteri (nowadays Pyrgos). During Ottoman occupation Skounteri was the seat of the local Ottoman governor (Beis). Skounteri has almost been depopulated the next years. In the short distance from Steni is located a big steep rock that named Kleisoura. During Ottoman period this place was the refuge of local anti-Ottoman insurgents known as Klepht. After the Greek independence, Steni became the most important village of the mountainous central Euboea. The last years there was the seat of the local municipality of Dirfys as well as the seat of the local community that includes moreover the small villages Kato Steni and Pyrgos.

== Historical population ==
| Year | Settlement | Community |
|---|---|---|
| 1991 | 796 | |
| 2001 | 691 | 926 |
| 2011 | 392 | 654 |
| 2021 | 312 | 565 |

== Tourism ==
The recent years the village has evolved as a popular destination for climbers and mountain hikers. In the village is the starting point of the path for the summit of Dirfys. There are also hiking paths towards the mountain refuges.

Interesting sights near village is the old Byzantine church known as Palaiopanagia. The temple had very important hagiography frescoes that date from 16th century. Five of these were stolen in 1978 but they returned to Greece recently. After the return the frescoes were exhibited in Byzantine Museum.
