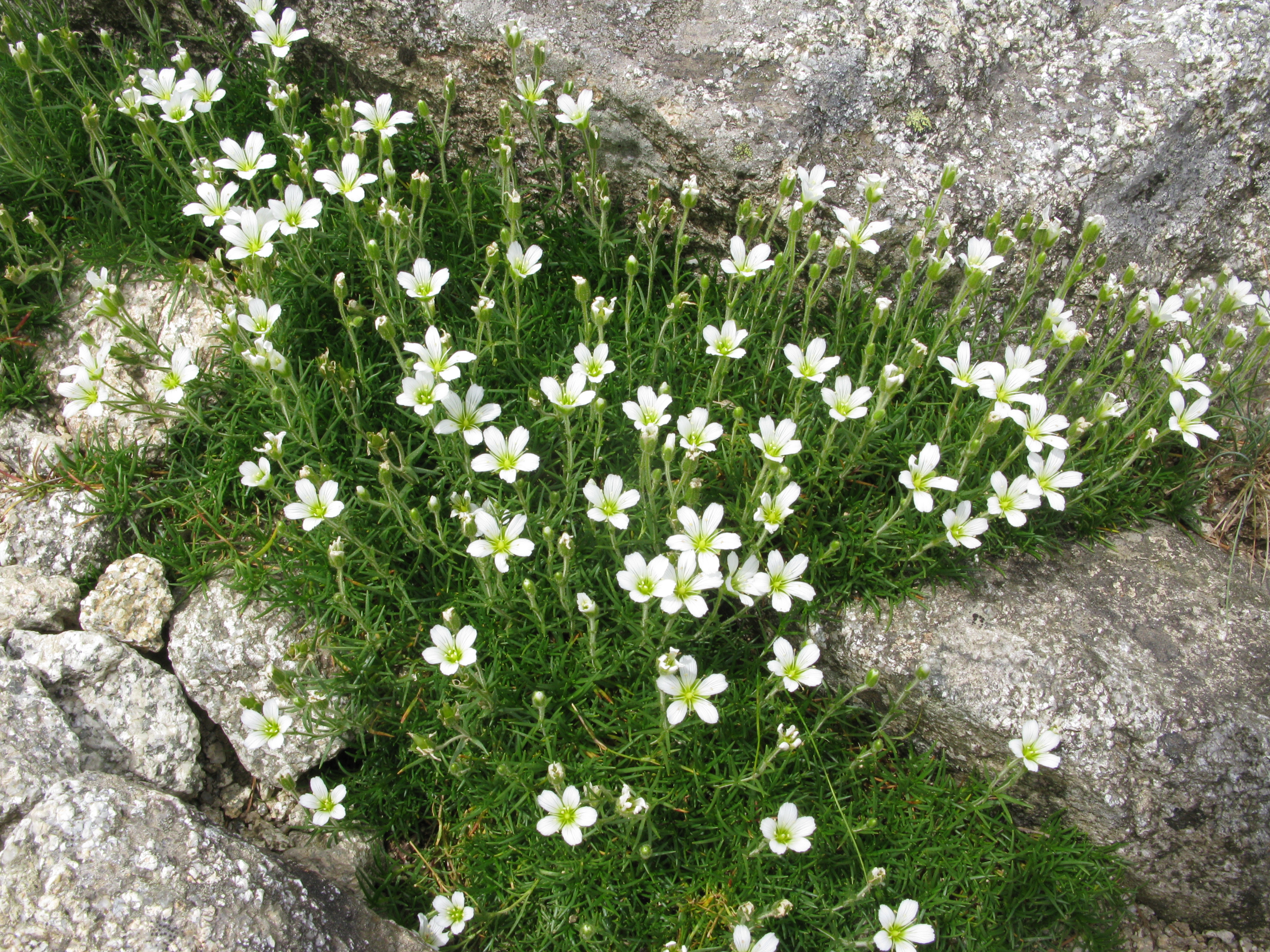
- Cherleria arctica

Scientific classification
- Kingdom: Plantae
- Clade: Tracheophytes
- Clade: Angiosperms
- Clade: Eudicots
- Order: Caryophyllales
- Family: Caryophyllaceae
- Tribe: Sclerantheae
- Genus: Cherleria; L.

Species
- See text

Synonyms
- Lidia Á.Löve & D.Löve; Wierzbickia Rchb.

= Cherleria =

Genus of flowering plants

Cherleria is a genus of flowering plants in the family Caryophyllaceae, found in the Arctic and mountainous areas of the northern hemisphere. Its center of diversity is the Balkans. The species shows ecological differentiation and multiple colonisations of alpine habitats. In 2017, Cherleria was expanded to include species from other genera.

== Species ==
Currently accepted species include:

- Cherleria arctica (Steven ex Ser.) A.J.Moore & Dillenb.
- Cherleria baldaccii (Halácsy) A.J.Moore & Dillenb.
- Cherleria biflora (L.) A.J.Moore & Dillenb.
- Cherleria capillacea (All.) A.J.Moore & Dillenb.
- Cherleria circassica (Albov) A.J.Moore & Dillenb.
- Cherleria dirphya (Trigas & Iatroú) A.J.Moore & Dillenb.
- Cherleria doerfleri (Hayek) A.J.Moore & Dillenb.
- Cherleria eglandulosa (Fenzl) Fedor.
- Cherleria garckeana (Asch. & Sint. ex Boiss.) A.J.Moore & Dillenb.
- Cherleria handelii (Mattf.) A.J.Moore & Dillenb.
- Cherleria langii (G.Reuss) A.J.Moore & Dillenb.
- Cherleria laricifolia (L.) Iamonico
- Cherleria marcescens (Fernald) A.J.Moore & Dillenb.
- Cherleria obtusiloba (Rydb.) A.J.Moore & Dillenb.
- Cherleria parnonia (Kamari) A.J.Moore & Dillenb.
- Cherleria rupestris (Labill.) A.J.Moore & Dillenb.
- Cherleria sedoides L.
- Cherleria wettsteinii (Mattf.) A.J.Moore & Dillenb.
- Cherleria yukonensis (Hultén) A.J.Moore & Dillenb.
