= Stratos Iordanoglou =

Greek basketball player

Stratos Iordanoglou Στράτος Ιορδάνογλου
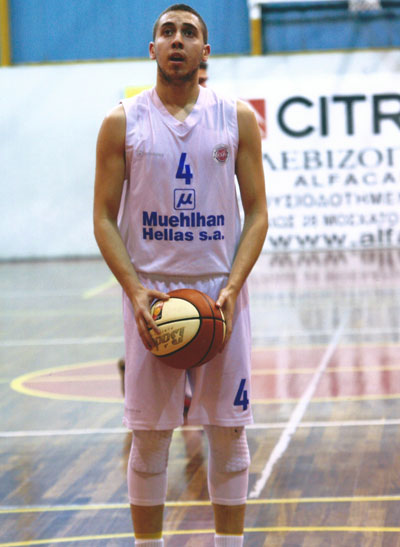

[[Agioi Anargyroi B.C|Agioi Anaryroi]]
- Position: point guard
- League: National League 2 Greece

Personal information
- Born: November 4, 1997 (age 29) Maroussi, Greece
- Listed height: 6 ft 2 in (1.88 m)
- Listed weight: 165 lb (75 kg)

Career information
- Playing career: 2009-–present

Career history
- 2009–2011: Proodeftiki
- 2011–2025: Ikaros Kallitheas
- 2025-present: G.E Agion Anargyron

Efstratios Iordanoglou (alternate spellings: Stratos) (Greek: Στράτος Ιορδάνογλου; born November 4, 1997, in Maroussi, Greece) is a Greek basketball player for G.E Agion Anargyron (National League 2 Greece). He is a right-handed 1.88 m (6 ft 2 in) tall point guard.

== Professional career ==
Iordanoglou began his career with Proodeftiki. In 2011, he moved to the Greek team: Ikaros Kallitheas. He has participated in Greek National Team΄s training camps during the 2012–2013 period.

== Greek National Championship 2013 (under 16) ==
Stratos Iordanoglou was voted by the coaches of the participating teams as one of the best five players of the Greek National Championship 2013 (under 16). He was awarded by the Deputy Mayor for Education, Culture and Sport Mr Athanasios Karagiannis in the city of Grevena.

== Greek & Cyprus School Championship 2014 ==
Gold medal with Lampiri Lyceum in the Greek & Cyprus School Championship held in Patras and organized by the Ministry of Education & Religious Affairs.

== Greek & Cyprus School Championship 2015 ==
Gold medal with Lampiri Lyceum in the Greek & Cyprus School Championship held in Larnaca and organized by the Ministry of Education & Religious Affairs.

== Greek National Championship 2015 (under 18) ==
Silver medal as point guard with Ikaros Kallitheas in the city of Ptolemaida.

== Discrimination ==
Playoffs U16 ΕSKANA: 1st position
2013 U16 ESKANA Championship: 1st position
2013 U16 Greek National Championship: 3rd position
2014 U18 ESKANA Championship: 2nd position
2014 Greek & Cyprus School Championship 2014: 1st position
2015 Greek & Cyprus School Championship 2015: 1st position
2015 U18 Greek National Championship: 2nd position

Iordanoglou Highlights 1
Iordanoglou Highlights 2
