= Amarynthos =

Amarynthos Αμάρυνθος
- Municipal unit
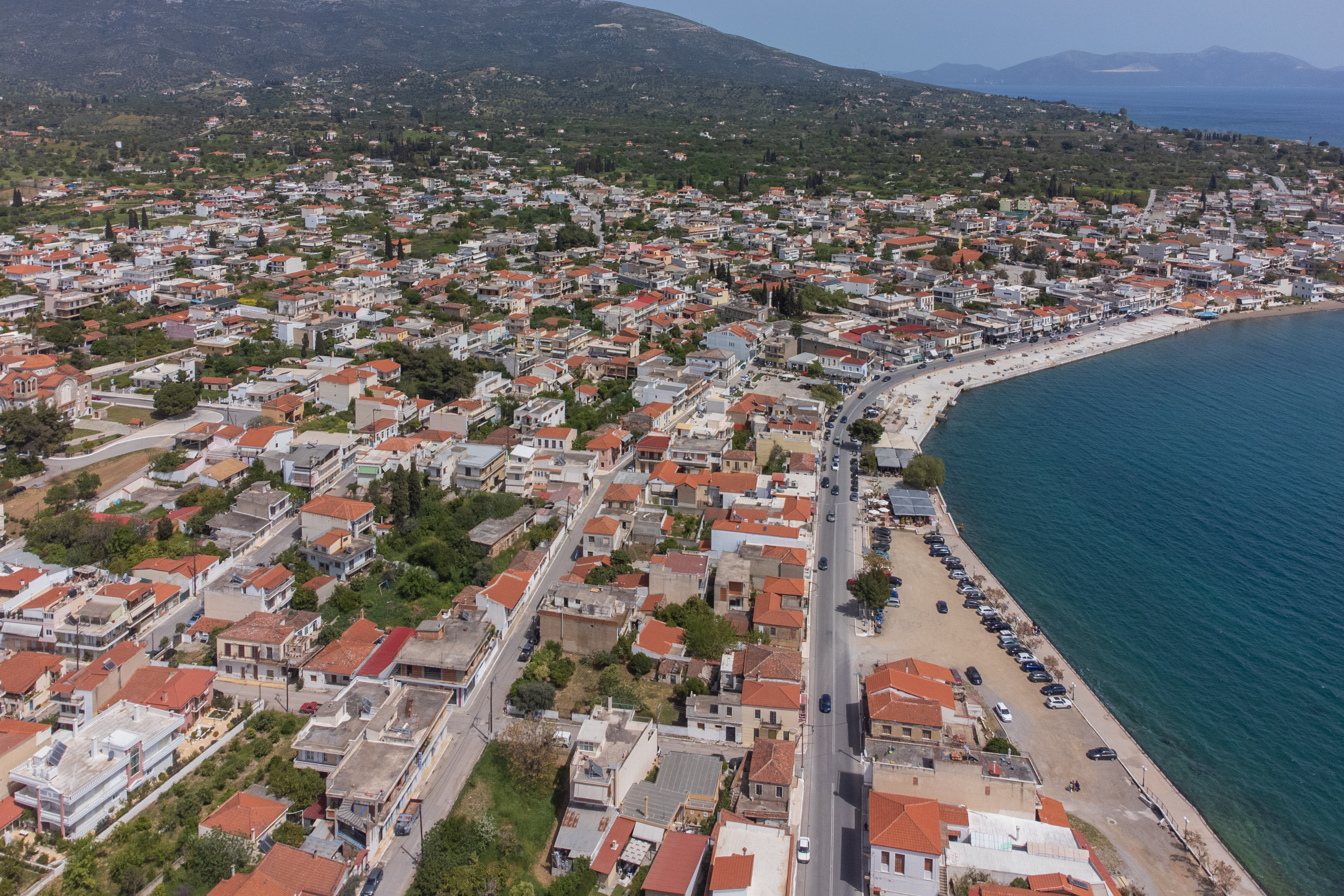
- Aerial view of Amarynthos

- Location within the regional unit

- Location within Greece
- Coordinates: 38.3870°N 23.9091°E
- Country: Greece
- Administrative region: Central Greece
- Regional unit: Euboea
- Municipality: Eretria
- Districts: 5

Area
  - Municipal unit: 109.909 km^{2} (42.436 sq mi)

Population (2021)
  - Municipal unit: 6,085
  - Municipal unit density: 55.36/km^{2} (143.4/sq mi)
  - Community: 3,368
- Time zone: UTC+2 (EET)
  - Summer (DST): UTC+3 (EEST)
- Postal code: 340 06
- Area code: 22290
- Vehicle registration: ΧΑ

Amarynthos (Greek: Αμάρυνθος, [aˈmarinθos], also called Βάθεια Váthia), is a coastal town and a former municipality in Euboea, Greece. Since the 2011 local government reform it is part of the municipality Eretria, of which it is a municipal unit. The municipal unit has an area of 109.909 km^{2}. Amarynthos is 8 km east of Eretria, 27 km southeast of Chalcis, 63 km northwest of Karystos and 10 km north of Kalamos, across the gulf. The Greek National Road 44 (Thebes - Chalcis - Karystos) passes through the town.

== History ==
The area of Amarynthos, along with the region of Eretria, has a long and rich history. Many scientists place Eretria of the Mycenaean period in the location of the present town of Amarynthos. The archaeological artifacts testify a permanent settlement in this location since the Late Neolithic period, around 3000 BC, which was one of the most important Helladic settlements and a significant port on the island of Euboea, during the Early Bronze Age. It had built its own trade with the Aegean Islands, concluded from the findings of Cycladic art in the region.

During the Middle Helladic period, Amarynthos had developed its trade with mainland Greece and produced magnificent pieces of the Minyean art, while in the Late Helladic period it was one of the main areas of Euboea. During the 2nd millennium BC, the Ionians arrived in the southern parts of Greece and settled Euboea, while the name of Amarynthos is mentioned in clay tablets with inscriptions in the Linear B script. Apart from the trade, the locals also occupied with agriculture, pastoralism, fishing and copper processing.

In ancient times, there was a festival in Amarynthos called "Amarynthia", dedicated to Amarysia Artemis, who was worshipped as the patron goddess of Amarynthos and whose Temple of Artemis Amarynthia was located in the plain of the region, being one of the most important in Central Greece. Parts of it were excavated between 1987 and 1992, hosted now at the Museum of Eretria. In Greek mythology, Amarynthos was a man from Eretria who usually ran after Artemis because of his love for her, and his name was given to the town. Pausanias in his Description of Greece, mentions, along with Amarynthos, a town in Attica called Athmonia, where the Athenians also celebrated Amarysia Artemis in a festival as splendid as the one in Amarynthos (1.31.5). Callimachus says that in Amarynthos, Artemis was worshipped as hornless (kolainis), because Agamemnon sacrificed to her a hornless ram made of wax, while Claudius Aelianus refers to the Eretrians who maimed animals to Artemis at Amarynthos. Strabo, in the Geographica, locates the village of Amarynthos seven stadia distant from the walls of Eretria, to which the village belongs (10.1.10). In 2024, during an excavation at the Artemis Amarynthos sanctuary, archaeologists discovered evidence of animal sacrifices, such as hearths, altars and layers of ash with calcined animal bones.

Amarynthos, like the whole of Euboea, was later ruled by the Macedonians, the Romans, the Byzantines, the Venetians and the Ottoman Turks until it joined the modern Greek state around 1830. After the Greco-Turkish War (1919–22) and the population exchange between Greece and Turkey, the arrival of Greek refugees from Asia Minor in Euboea, many of which settled in Amarynthos, boosted the population of the town. In World War II, the Nazi Germany's troops burnt parts of the town.

== Geography ==
The municipal unit Amarynthos is located in Central Euboea and stretches from the coast of the South Euboean Gulf into the mountainous inland. The area near the coast, around the town Amarynthos, is relatively flat and consists of farmlands. The Euboean Olympus overlooks the town, situated 10 km north of it. Amarynthos has a beach and several hotels, restaurants, bars and taverns can be found in the town. Amarynthos has several schools and shops, while the nearest hospital is in Chalcis.

== Culture ==
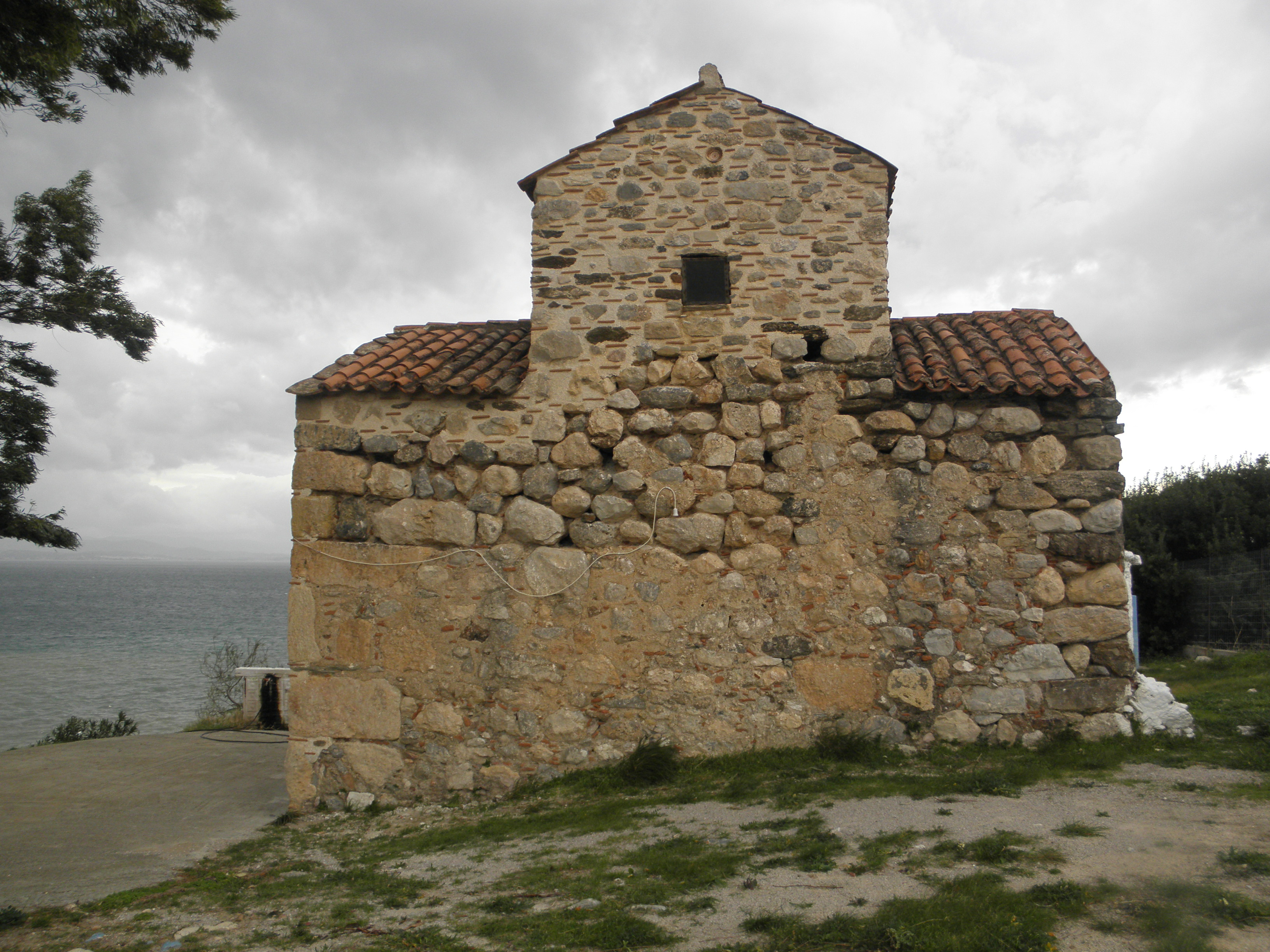
The byzantine church of Theotokos

Worth visiting in Amarynthos are the Byzantine churches of "Koimisi tis Theotokou" (κοίμηση της Θεοτόκου), "Metamorphosi tou Sotiros" (μεταμόρφωση του Σωτήρος) and "Zoodochos Pigi" (Ζωοδόχος πηγή), while to the northeast of the town there is the Byzantine monastery of "Agios Nikolaos" (άγιος Νικόλαος), with wall paintings of the 12th century. A Macedonian tomb dating from the 4th century BC has been excavated in 1897 one kilometre outside of Amarynthos in a location called Vlychos. There is a 14th-century church named "Panagitsa" (Παναγίτσα) close to Ano Vatheia. Many new ancient monuments are revealed every year thanks to the excavations of the Swiss School of Archeology.

== Subdivisions ==
The municipal unit Amarynthos is subdivided into the following communities (constituent villages in brackets):

- Amarynthos (Amarynthos, Galazia Nera)
- Ano Vatheia (Ano Vatheia, Koukaki)
- Gymno (Gymno, Metamorfosi)
- Kallithea
- Seta (Seta, Kato Seta)

== Historical population ==
Year	Town population	Municipal unit population
1981	3,309	-
1991	3,638	6,068
2001	4,141	7,356
2011	3,672	6,723
2021	3,368	6,085
