= Mount Olympus (Euboea) =

Mountain in Greece

Olympus
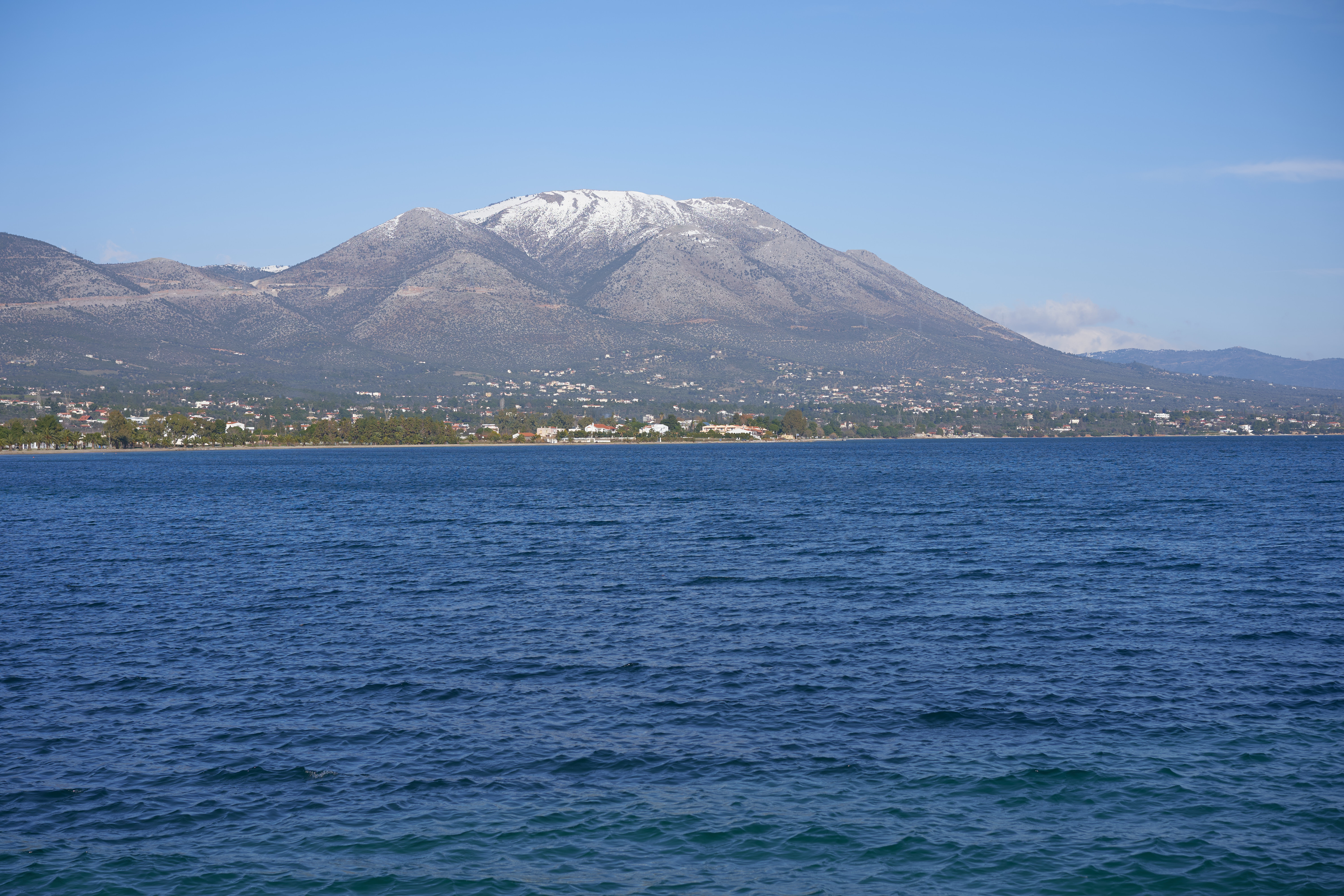

Highest point
- Elevation: 1,172 m (3,845 ft)
- Coordinates: 38°28′44″N 23°51′54″E

Naming
- Pronunciation: English: /əˈlɪmpəs, oʊˈ-/ Greek: [ˈoli(m)bos]

Geography
- Location within Greece
- Location: eastcentral Euboea

Mount Olympus (Greek: Όλυμπος, romanized: Ólympos) is a mountain in the east central part of the island of Euboea, Greece. Its maximum elevation is 1,172 m. It is not the highest mountain of Euboea, that is 1,743 m high Dirfi, 16 km to the north. Olympus is 10 km north of Amarynthos, 11 km northeast of Eretria and 24 km east of the city of Chalcis. There are forests on the northern slopes while most of the mountain range is covered with grassland and bushes.
