= Temple of Artemis Amarynthia =

Ancient sanctuary in Amarynthos on Euboea

The Temple of Artemis Amarynthia was a sanctuary in Amarynthos in Euboea, dedicated to the goddess Artemis. It was a significant shrine of Artemis and arguably the foremost center of her cult in Northern Greece.

Archeological excavations reveal the date of founding to the 6th-century BC. The sanctuary is mentioned by ancient authors from the 3rd-century BC until the 3rd-century AD. According to Callimachus in the 3rd century BC, the temple was established by Agamemnon and often referred to as the temple of Artemis Kolainis (Hornless), "because Agamemnon sacrificed to her a hornless ram made of wax."

Strabo described the sanctuary:

The village Amarynthos, which is seven stadia distant from the walls [of Eretria in Euboia], belongs to this city . . . As for the power the Eretrians once had, this is evidenced by the pillar which they once set up in the temple of Artemis Amarynthia. It was inscribed thereon that they made their festal procession with three thousand heavy-armed soldiers, six hundred horsemen, and sixty chariots. And they ruled over the peoples of Andros, Teos, Keos, and other islands.

The temple was the center for the cult of Artemis in Northern Greece, and the destination for the annual procession from Eretria during festival of Amarysia. Pausanias described the shrine as the place where the main festival of Amarysia took place in the honor of Artemis, though he stated that the Amarysia celebrated in Athens was "no less splendid than the Euboian." Aelian stated in the 3rd-century that "The people of Eretria [in Euboia] sacrifice maimed animals to Artemis at Amarynthos."

If the temple was still in use by the 4th-century, it would have been closed during the persecution of pagans in the late Roman Empire, when laws against non-Christian religions and their sanctuaries where enacted by the Christian emperors.

Researchers have been trying to locate the remains of the temple since the 19th-century. However, using the description made by Strabo, who claimed the temple to be seven stadia (1.5 kilometers or 1 mile) from the town of Eretria, the temple could not be located until excavations made since 2007 has been confirmed to be of the temple. The site was finally located at the foot of the Palaioekklisies hill near the small fishing town of Amarynthos on the Greek island of Euboea, about 10 km from the place where the temple was wrongly thought to be located. The remains has revealed structures from the 6th-century to the second BC, containing an underground fountain, inscribed bases, sealed tiles, and coins containing the name "Artemis".

== See also ==
- Ancient Greek temple
- List of Ancient Greek temples
