= Psachna =

Town in Euboea, Greece

Psachna Ψαχνά
- Community
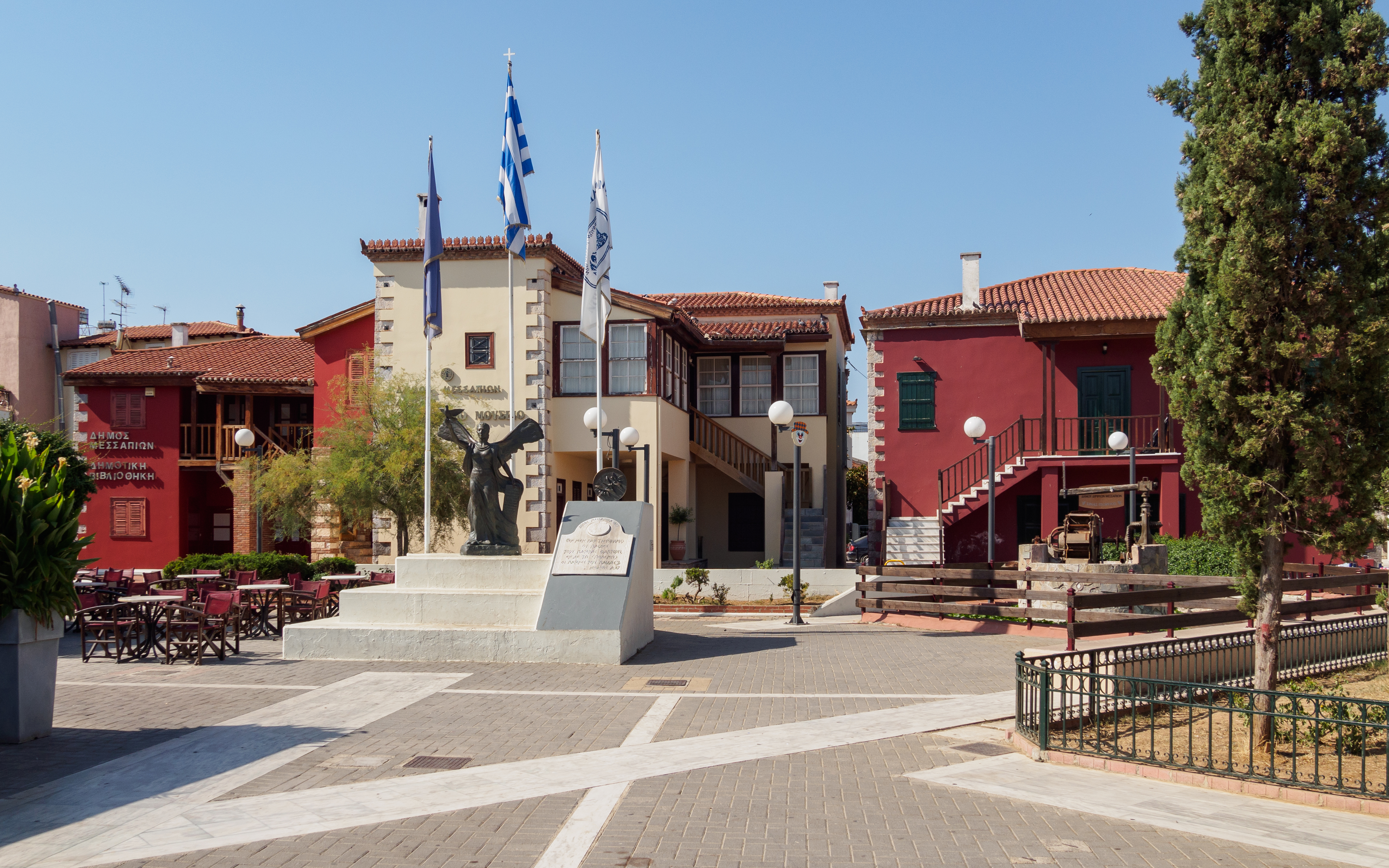
- The central square of Psachna

- Location within Greece
- Coordinates: 38°35′N 23°39′E
- Country: Greece
- Administrative region: Central Greece
- Regional unit: Euboea
- Municipality: Dirfys-Messapia
- Municipal unit: Messapia
- Village established: 1470 (556 years ago)

Population (2021)
  - Community: 5,721
- Time zone: UTC+2 (EET)
  - Summer (DST): UTC+3 (EEST)
- Vehicle registration: ΧΑ

Psachna (Greek: Ψαχνά) is a town in Euboea, central Greece, 16 km north of Chalcis. It is built in a small plain in the central-west part of the island. Psachna is the seat of Dirfys-Messapia municipality and the seat of Messapia municipal unit. The town is also known for the Psachna campus of National and Kapodistrian University of Athens and the football team Iraklis Psachna. Its population is 5,827 residents according to 2011 census.

== History ==
The settlement of Psachna was built by refugees after the sack of Chalcis in 1470 during the First Ottoman–Venetian War. During the Ottoman occupation, it was a small village with few houses. After Greek independence, refugees from Samos were installed in Psachna, leading to the naming of a district of Psachna as "Samiotika". The population of Psachna was increased in the last century when residents of the more mountainous villages such as Pyxaria, Vavoula, Apogremno moved in. In August 2020, the town and the region was badly hit from catastrophic floods that resulted in 6 deaths.

== Historical population ==
Year	Settlement	Community
1991	5,649	
2001	5,766	6,005
2011	5,827	6,250
2021	5,500	5,721

== Description ==
The National and Kapodistrian University of Athens has a campus in Psachna. There are three monasteries near Psachna: Saint John Kalyvitis, Panagia Makrymallis and Panagia Gorgoepikoos. The first two were built during the Byzantine period, destroyed later and rebuilt. The third monastery was built after 1960.

Psachna has also the best medical facilities in the area.
