= Christos Kollias =

Greek basketball player

Christos Kollias (born December 13, 1986, in Amaroussion, Greece) is a Greek basketball player. He is 1.90m (6 ft 2+ in) tall and plays the shooting guard position. He currently plays for Papagou B.C.

== Career ==
He has played for the youth team of Panathinaikos Athens. In 2004 he transferred to Pagrati BC and played there for 3 years. In 2007-2008 he played for Halkida BC. He has also played for AS Ionikos Neas Filadelfeias BC 2008–2009.
