= Cherleria handelii =

Scientific classification
- Kingdom: Plantae
- Clade: Tracheophytes
- Clade: Angiosperms
- Clade: Eudicots
- Order: Caryophyllales
- Family: Caryophyllaceae
- Genus: Cherleria
- Species: C. handelii

Binomial name
- Cherleria handelii (Mattf.) A.J.Moore & Dillenb.

Synonyms
- Minuartia handelii Mattf.

Species of flowering plant

Cherleria handelii, or Handei-Maceti's sandwort, is a perennial plant of the family Caryophyllaceae. It is a stenoendemic from the mountain Čvrsnica, Bosnia and Herzegovina.

== Description ==
Cherleria handelii is a perennial plant subsided in the humus drilling, length up to about 15 (-20) cm. The stems are covered with dense leaves, which can be subsided or standing. Opposite are sitting, with sleeve, triangular to a barrel. At the bottom are a bit dull, with slightly rough and a little eyelashed edges.

It blooms in June and July. Flowers are individual, with a large, cylindrical cup, which is at the base as well as cut down. Length is about 4-4.5 mm, naked or slightly hairy at the base. Petals cups are linear-oblong, about 4-4.5 mm long, and about 1.8 to 2 mm wide. At the top are rounded. In the rosary, the petals are oblong, essentially wedge-shaped, long up to about 5 mm, and about 1.8 to 2 mm wide. Exceed sepals in flowers are in the 10 stamen, and pistil has a 2-3 door (exceptionally more).

Fruit is a quiver, cylindrical to egg-conical, about 4-4.5 mm long, diameter of 1.8–2 mm, with 3 (4) of the flap. Seeds are spherically-kidneys, width 1.2-1.5 mm and about 1-1.2 mm high.
