= Marousi =

City within the Athens urban area, Greece

Marousi Μαρούσι (Greek)
- Municipality
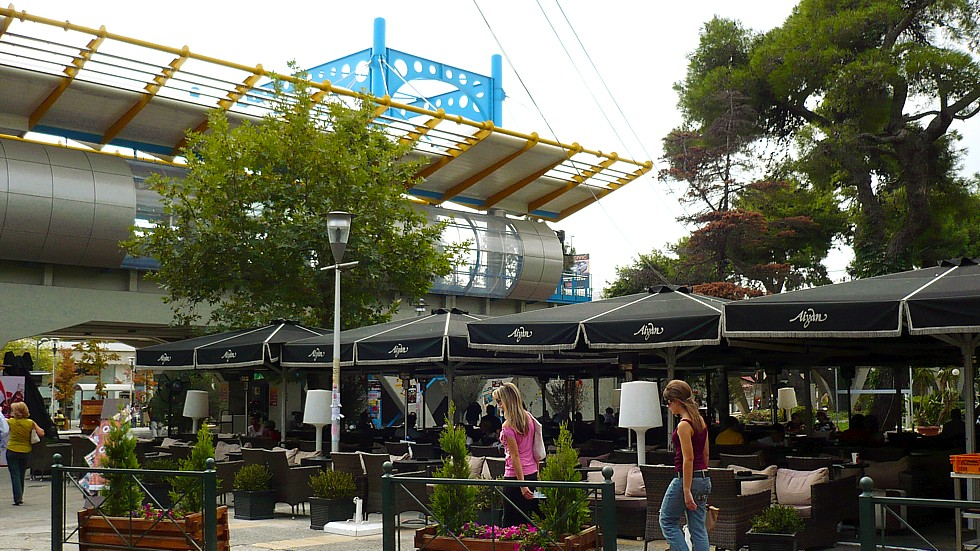
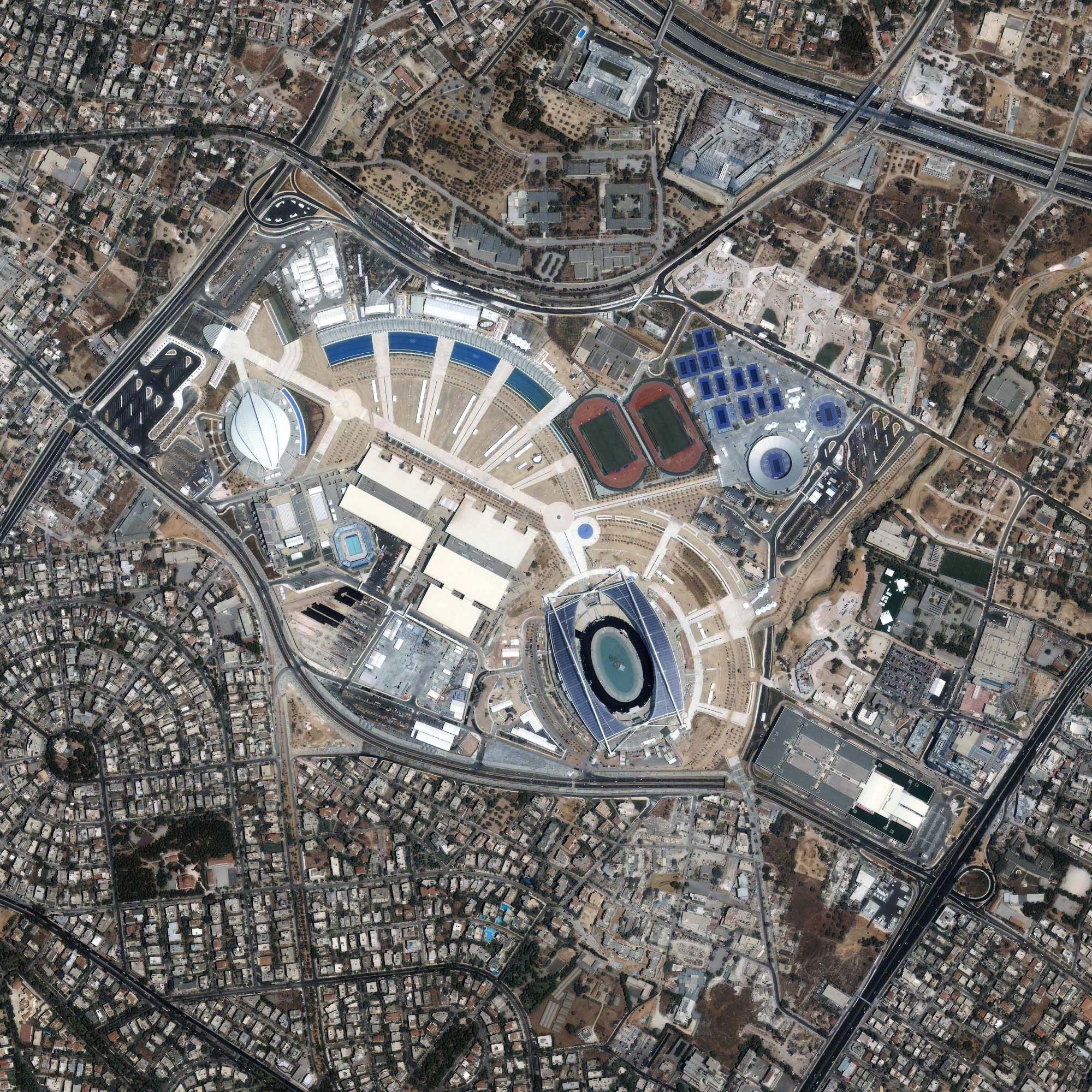
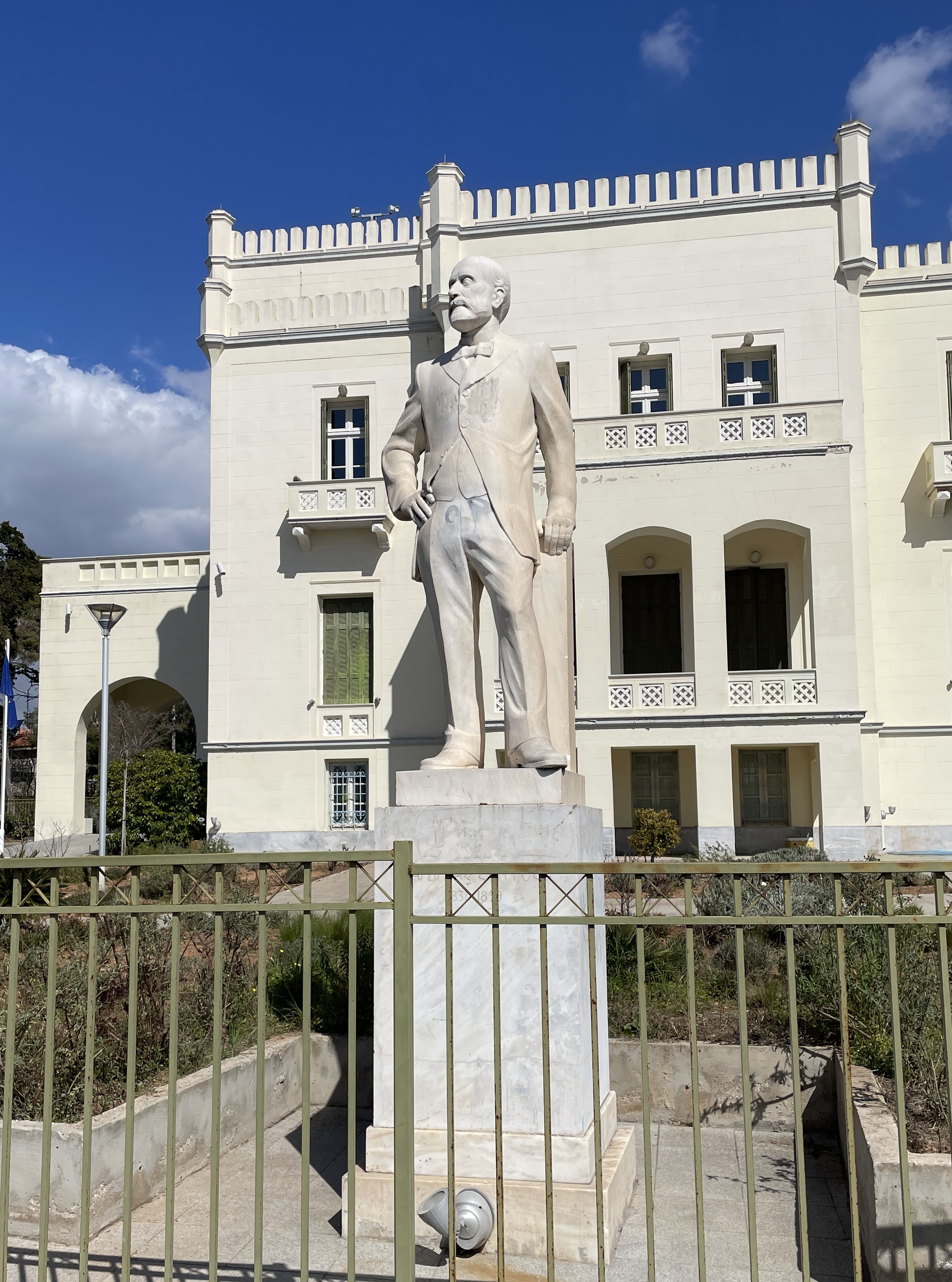
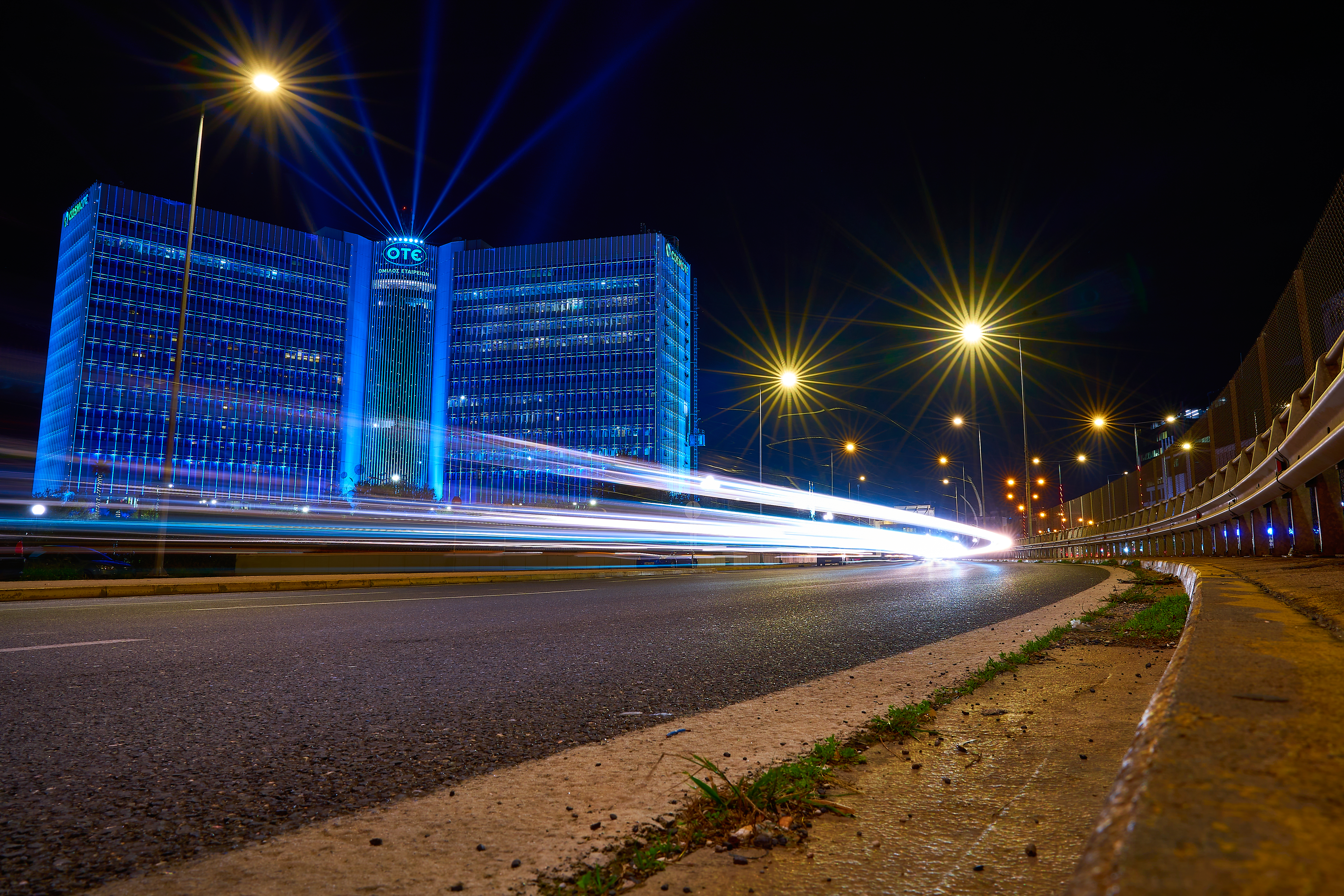
- Square at the Metro Station Athens Olympic Sports Complex Syggros mansion OTE Headquarters

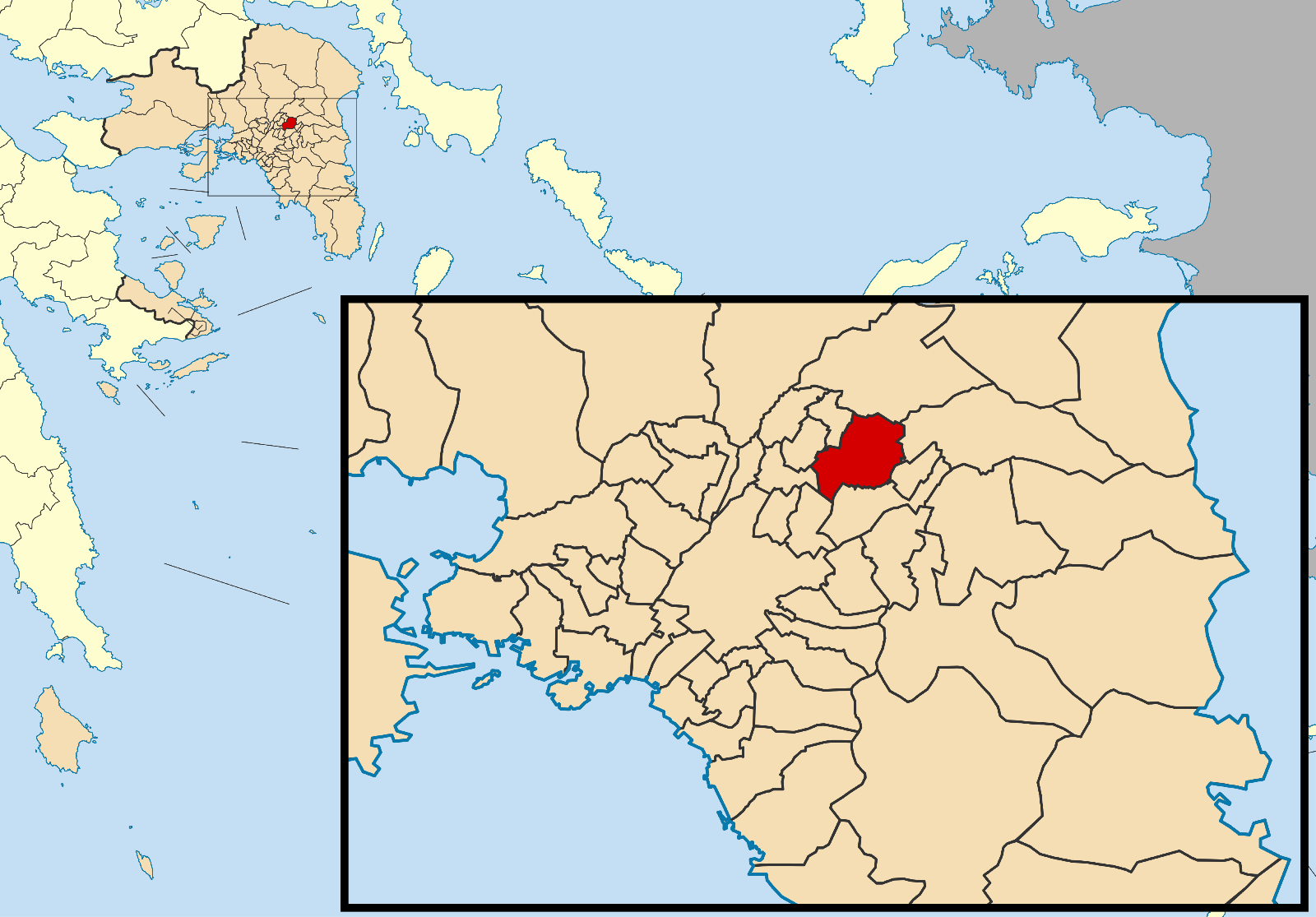

- Location within Greece
- Coordinates: 38°03′N 23°48′E
- Country: Greece
- Administrative region: Attica
- Regional unit: North Athens

Government
  - Mayor: Theodoros Ampatzoglou (since 2019)

Area
  - Municipality: 12.938 km^{2} (4.995 sq mi)
- Elevation: 230 m (750 ft)

Population (2021)
  - Municipality: 71,830
  - Density: 5,552/km^{2} (14,380/sq mi)
- Time zone: UTC+2 (EET)
  - Summer (DST): UTC+3 (EEST)
- Postal code: 151 22/23/24/25/26
- Area code: 21
- Vehicle registration: Z
- Website: maroussi.gr

Marousi or Maroussi (Greek: Μαρούσι), also known as Amarousio (Αμαρούσιο), is a city in the northeastern part of the Athens urban area, Greece. Marousi dates back to the era of the ancient Athenian Republic; its ancient name was Athmonon (Ἄθμονον) and it represented one of the 10 Athenian sub-cities. The area held a main ancient temple, where Amarysia Artemis, the goddess of hunting, was adored. Consequently the city's modern name derives from that of the goddess, Amarysia, which denotes the origin of the worship back in Amarynthos, Euboea. Its mayor is Theodoros Ampatzoglou, re-elected in 2023.

== Geography ==
Marousi is situated 13 km (8 mi) northeast of Athens city centre. The municipality has an area of 12.938 km^{2}. The built-up area of Marousi is continuous with those of the neighbouring suburbs Pefki, Kifisia, Vrilissia, and Halandri. Within Marousi lies the biggest forest in urban Athens, "Dasos Syngrou" (also "Alsos Syggrou"). The Athens Olympic Sports Complex, the largest sports complex in Greece, built for the 2004 Summer Olympics, is located in the southwestern part of the municipality.

The main thoroughfare is the Kifisias Avenue (part of the EO83 road), which connects Marousi with central Athens and the A6 toll motorway. Marousi has 3 stations on Athens Metro Line 1, Nerantziotissa, Irini, and Marousi stations and two suburban (Proastiakos) commuter railway stations: Neratziotissa station and Kifisias railway station.

== Economy ==
Marousi's favourable infrastructure (A6 motorway, Athens Metro, and the Athens Suburban Railway) has led to strong economic growth. The main offices of the Greek subsidiaries of several multinational corporations, including Google, Kodak, Bayer, Kimberly-Clark, Siemens, Takeda Pharmaceutical Company, Microsoft, Nestlé, PwC, and the ANT1 television studios are located in Marousi. The managing office of Consolidated Contractors Company, a large Middle Eastern and International EPC Contractor, is located in Marousi. The Mall Athens, one of the largest shopping centres in southeastern Europe, is situated in the southwestern part of Marousi. The Golden Hall Mall is also located in Marousi, near the Olympic Stadium of Athens.

== Education ==
The new building of Greek Ministry of Education is located in Marousi, in the district Neratziotissa. In the same district is located the School of Pedagogical and Technological Education, a Greek university. The German School of Athens is also located in Marousi.

== Sports ==
Maroussi is the place of the Greek Olympic Sport Center. It is located in the southwest of the suburb, in an area that is named Kalogreza. Maroussi has also some sport gymnasium such as Dais Indoor Hall and Maroussi Indoor Hall that are used by local teams. Local teams are Maroussi B.C. with long-time presence in A1 Ethniki Basketball and A.C. Doukas with many titles in Handball and Futsal. The Olympic Stadium was used as home stadium by famous clubs of Greek football, including by AEK Athens as well as both Panathinaikos and Olympiacos.

Sport clubs based in Maroussi
Club	Founded	Sports	Achievements
Maroussi B.C.	1950	Basketball	2001 European cup in Basketball.
A.C. Doukas	1979	Basketball, Handball, Futsal and other sports	Panhellenic titles in Handball and Futsal
Niki Maroussi	1991	Basketball	Presence in Beta National basketball
Triton Maroussi	1994	Water Polo	Presence in A1 National women
Marousi 2004	1998	Baseball	Panhellenic titles in baseball

== Historical population ==
Year	Population
1981	48,150
1991	64,092
2001	69,470
2011	72,333
2021	71,830

The village was historically Arvanitika-speaking, but later underwent a language shift, partly due to its proximity to Athens. Dionysios Sourmelis, an Athenian native and participant in the Greek War of Independence, claimed that the native Greek inhabitants of Marousi, alongside those of other villages in Attica had been Albanized and forced to adopt the Arvanitika dialect.

== Twin cities ==
Marousi is twinned with the following cities:

- Faenza, Italy
- Niš, Serbia
- Lakatamia, Cyprus
- Mendavia, Spain

== Notable people ==
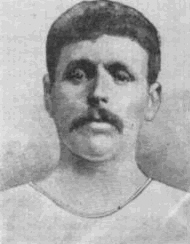
Spiros Louis

- Prince Michael of Greece (1939–2024), son of Prince Christopher of Greece and grandson of King George I of the Hellenes. Prince Michael lived in Marousi from his marriage to Marina Karella in 1965, since late 1970s.
- Stratos Iordanoglou (1997–), basketball player
- Vicky Kaya (1978–), fashion model and actress
- Christos Kollias (born 1986), Greek basketball player
- Labis Livieratos, singer
- Spiridon Louis (1873–1940), a Greek water-carrier who won the first modern-day Marathon at the 1896 Summer Olympics, thereby becoming a national hero
- Aimilia Tsoulfa, Golden Medalist in Sailing, Athens Olympic Games 2004
- Lydia Venieri, Artist
- Aliki Vougiouklaki (1934–1996), movie star and singer who appeared in 42 movies, mostly musicals
- Victor Vernicos (born 2006), Singer and Socialite

== Gallery ==
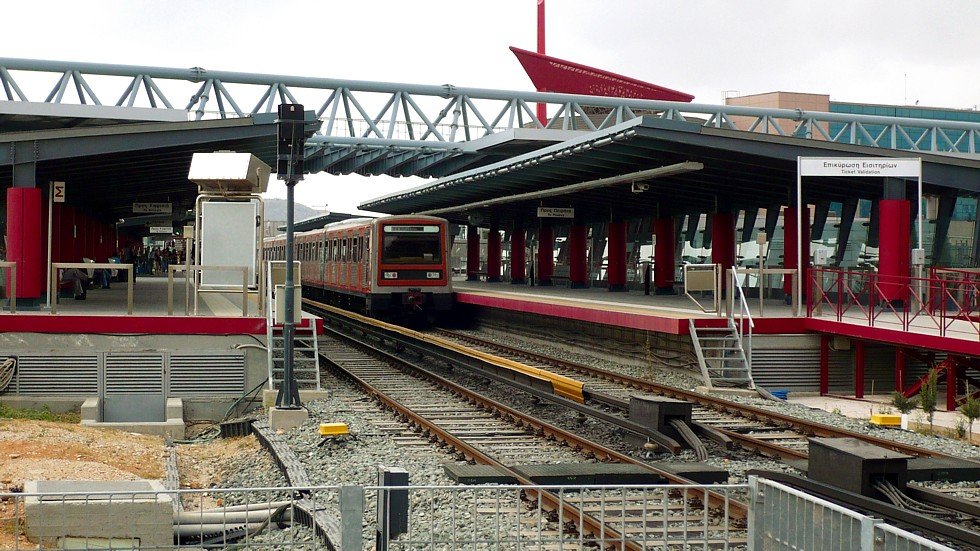
Nerantziotissa station at Marousi.

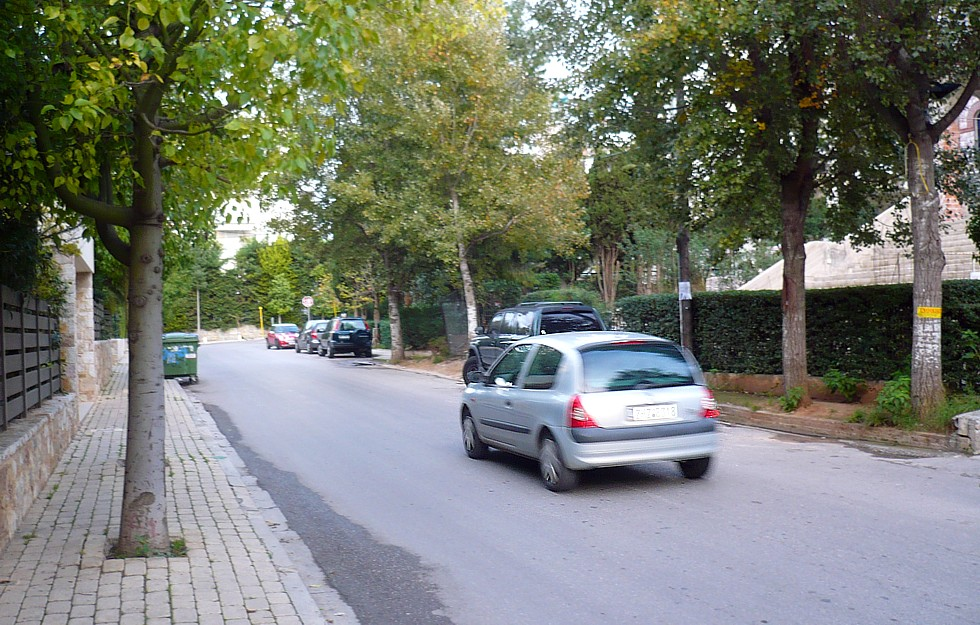
Agia Filothei neighbourhood at Marousi

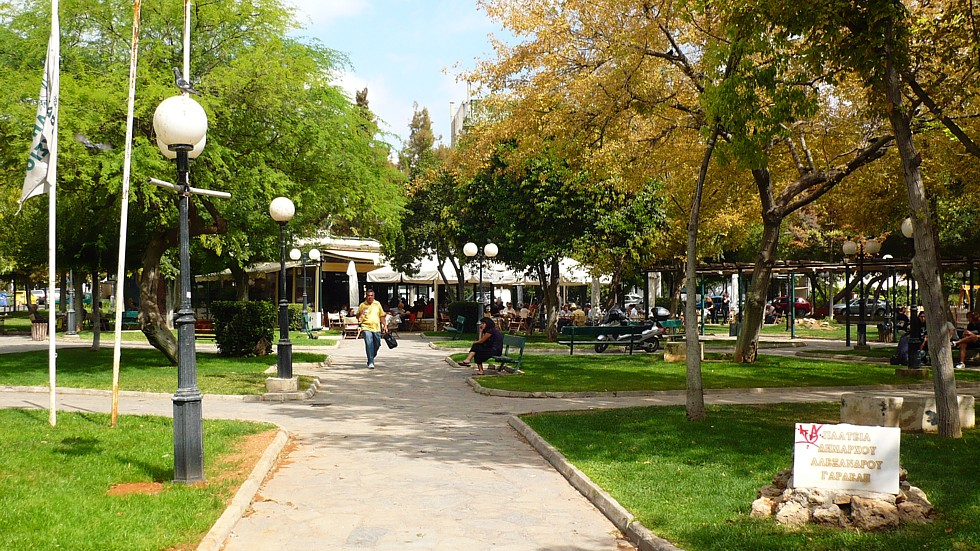
Pindou Square

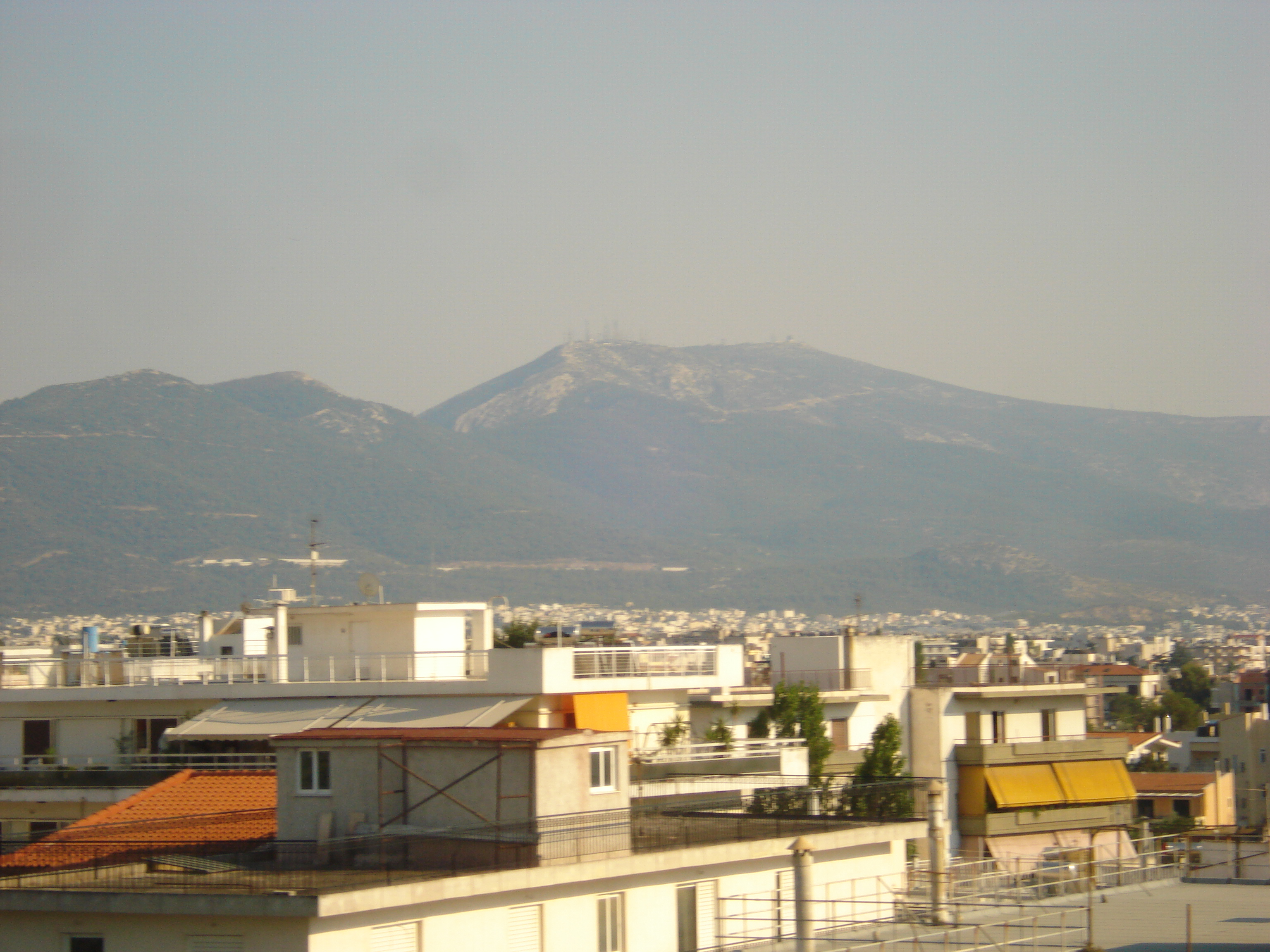
Mount Hymettus from Marousi

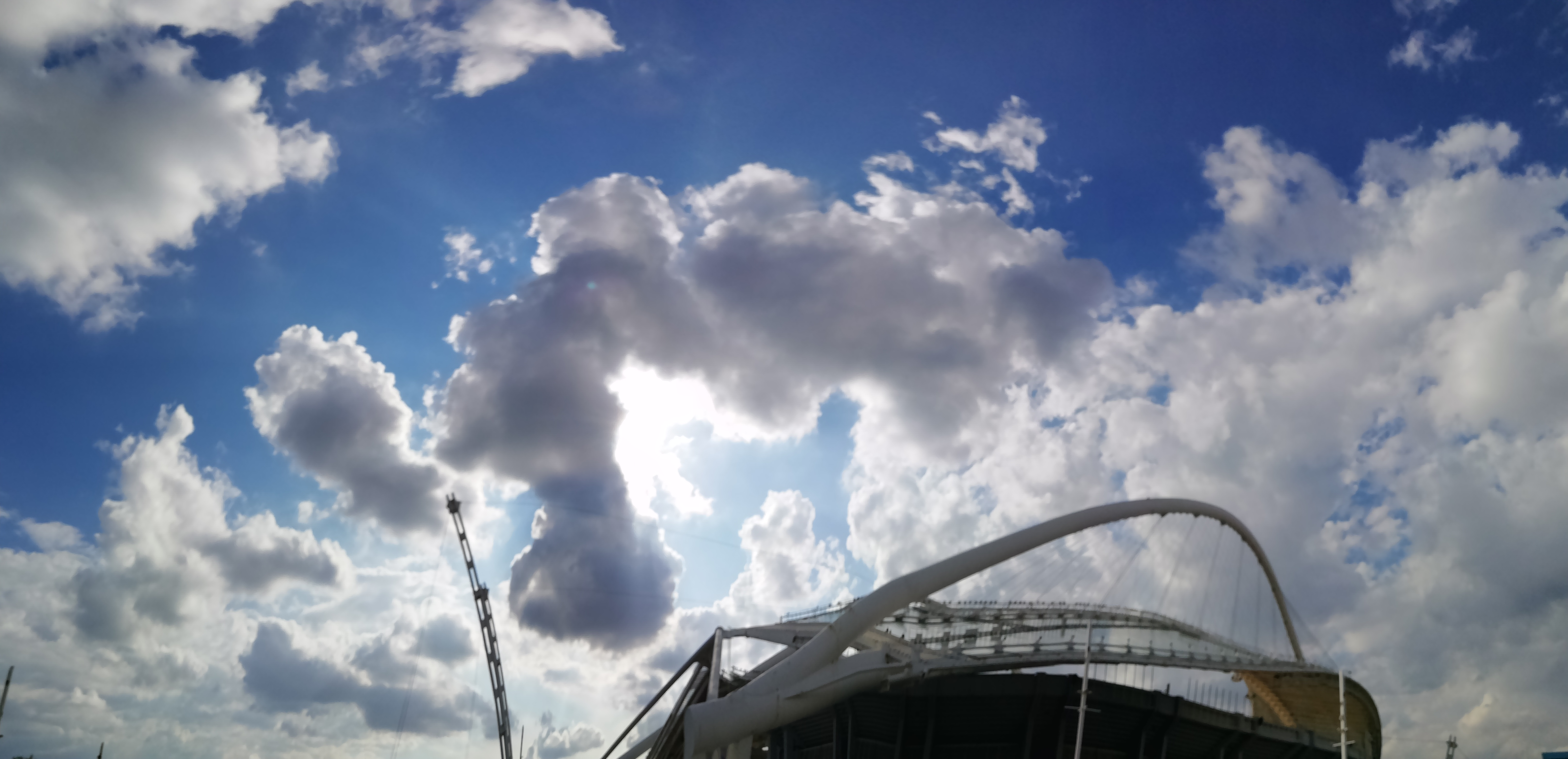
Athens Olympic Stadium

== See also ==
- List of settlements in Attica
