= Cherleria yukonensis =

Scientific classification
- Kingdom: Plantae
- Clade: Tracheophytes
- Clade: Angiosperms
- Clade: Eudicots
- Order: Caryophyllales
- Family: Caryophyllaceae
- Genus: Cherleria
- Species: C. yukonensis

Binomial name
- Cherleria yukonensis Hultén

Synonyms
- Lidia yukonensis (Hultén) Á.Löve & D.Löve (1975 publ. 1976); Minuartia yukonensis Hultén (1967 publ. 1968)

Species of flowering plant

Cherleria yukonensis, the Yukon sandwort or Yukon stitchwort, is a plant species native to Yukon and Northwest Territories of Canada, as well as Alaska, and The Russian Far East. Flora of North America and some other publications also report it from British Columbia, but more recent work shows those collections to have been misidentified. Cherleria yukonensis grows in dry, rocky meadows at elevations less than 1000 m.

Cherleria yukonensis is a perennial herb with a large taproot, spreading out along the ground to form low-lying mats. Stems are up to 30 cm long. Leaves are narrow and linear, up to 18m mm long but rarely more than 1.5 mm across. Flowers are born in cymes of up to 13 green to purplish cup-shaped flowers.
