= Dirfys =

Dirfys Δίρφυς
- Municipal unit
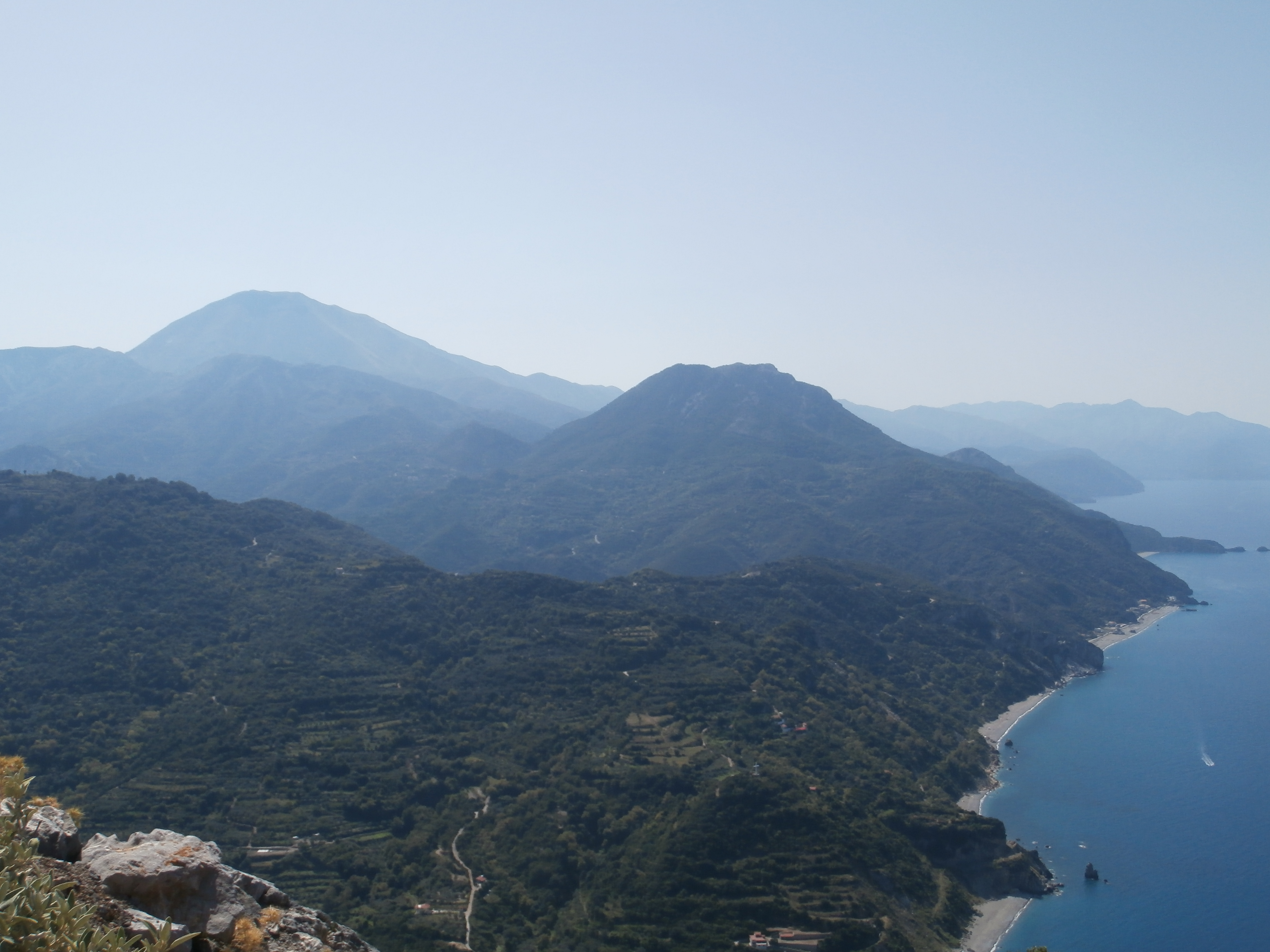
- Aerial view of the northern Evian coast and Mount Dirfi

- Location within the regional unit

- Location within Greece
- Coordinates: 38°35′N 23°50′E
- Country: Greece
- Administrative region: Central Greece
- Regional unit: Euboea
- Municipality: Dirfys-Messapia

Area
  - Municipal unit: 344.16 km^{2} (132.88 sq mi)

Population (2021)
  - Municipal unit: 3,886
  - Municipal unit density: 11.29/km^{2} (29.24/sq mi)
- Time zone: UTC+2 (EET)
  - Summer (DST): UTC+3 (EEST)
- Vehicle registration: ΧΑ

Dirfys (Greek: Δίρφυς) is a former municipality in Euboea, Greece, named after Mount Dirfys. Since the 2011 local government reform it is part of the municipality Dirfys-Messapia, of which it is a municipal unit. The municipal unit has an area of 344.16 km^{2}. Population 3,886 (2021). The seat of the municipality was in Steni.

== International relations ==
Dirfys is twinned with:

- Alatri in Italy
