= Messapia, Greece =

Messapia Μεσσάπια
- Municipal unit
- Location within the regional unit

- Location within Greece
- Coordinates: 38°35′N 23°39′E
- Country: Greece
- Administrative region: Central Greece
- Regional unit: Euboea
- Municipality: Dirfys-Messapia

Area
  - Municipal unit: 433.26 km^{2} (167.28 sq mi)

Population (2021)
  - Municipal unit: 12,048
  - Municipal unit density: 27.808/km^{2} (72.022/sq mi)
- Time zone: UTC+2 (EET)
  - Summer (DST): UTC+3 (EEST)
- Vehicle registration: ΧΑ

Messapia (Greek: Μεσσάπια) is a former municipality in Euboea, Greece. Since the 2011 local government reform, it is part of the Dirfys-Messapia municipality, of which it is a municipal unit. The municipal unit has an area of 433.26 km^{2} and a population of 12,048 (2021). Its name derives from the ancient river Messapios, which flows through the middle of the island. The seat of the municipality was in Psachna.
