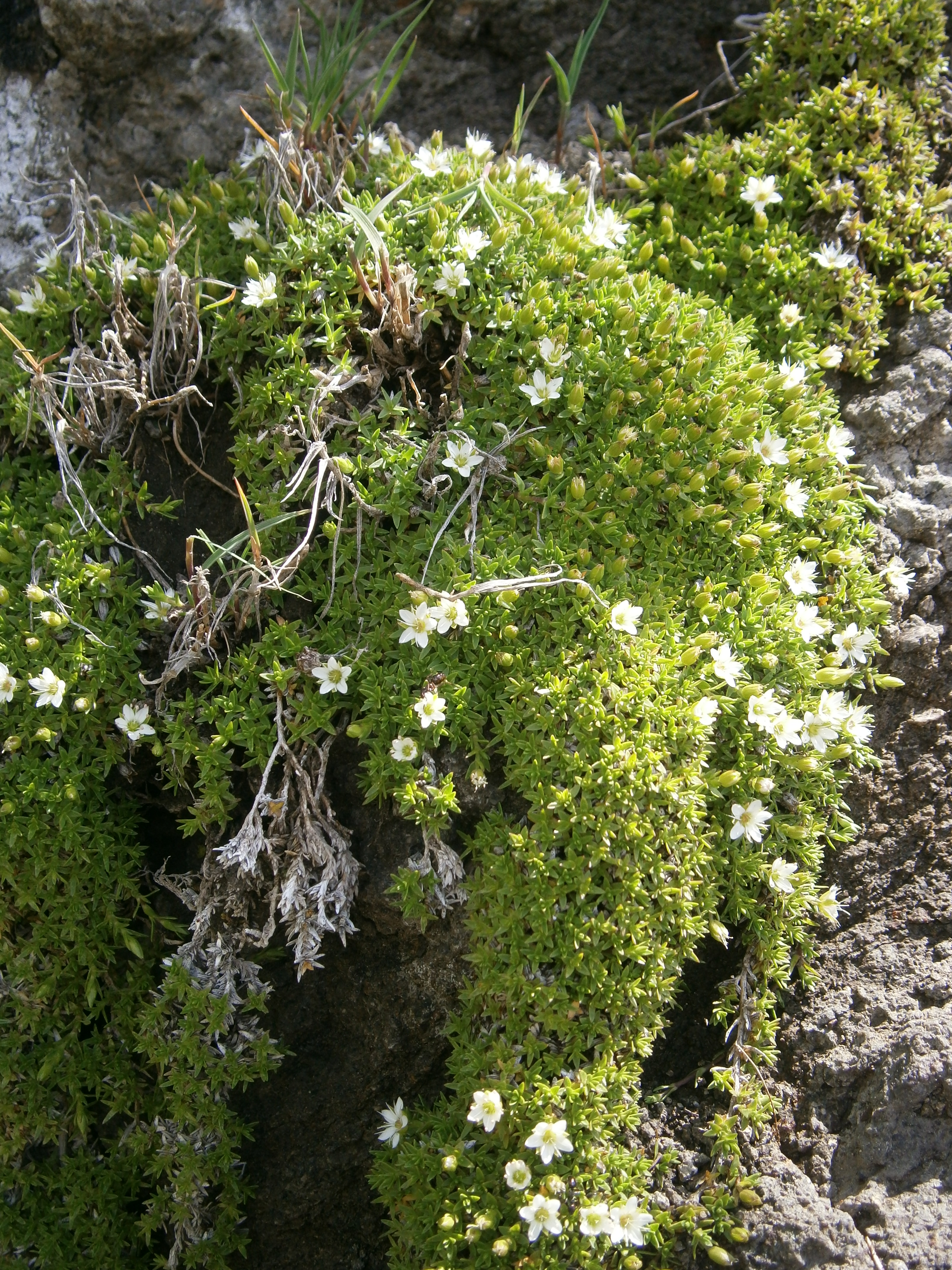
- Cherleria biflora

Scientific classification
- Kingdom: Plantae
- Clade: Embryophytes
- Clade: Tracheophytes
- Clade: Angiosperms
- Clade: Eudicots
- Order: Caryophyllales
- Family: Caryophyllaceae
- Genus: Cherleria
- Species: C. biflora

Binomial name
- Cherleria biflora (L.) A.J.Moore & Dillenb.

Synonyms
- Synonyms (24): Alsine biflora; Alsine biflora var. carnosula; Alsine biflora f. densissima; Alsine biflora f. laxior; Alsine biflora var. rigidula; Alsine biflora f. rosea; Alsine biflora var. versicolor; Alsinella biflora; Alsinopsis biflora; Arenaria arctica var. lapponica; Arenaria arctica var. sajanensis; Arenaria diantha; Arenaria sajanensis; Arenaria sajanensis var. carnosula; Arenaria sajanensis var. rigidula; Arenaria scandinavica; Cerastium biflorum; Lidia biflora; Minuartia biflora; Minuartia biflora f. versicolor; Minuartia sajanensis; Minuartia sajanensis; Sabulina biflora; Stellaria biflora

= Cherleria biflora =

Plant species in the carnation family

Cherleria biflora is a species of plant in the family Caryophyllaceae. It is known as mountain stitchwort.

== Description ==
The species is perennial, and forms mats and cushions. It flowers from June to August.

== Taxonomy ==
Cherleria biflora was initially classified by Carl Linnaeus in the Stellaria genus with the name Stellaria biflora in 1753. It has been reclassified many times by other botanists, but the accepted name was created in 2017 when the species was moved to Cherleria by Abigail J. Moore and Markus Siegfrid Dillenberger. Together with its genus it is part of the Caryophyllaceae family and has no accepted varieties, however several have been proposed and are among its 24 synonyms. There are 13 species names that are listed as synonyms by Plants of the World Online.

Table of Synonyms
Name	Year	Notes
Alsine biflora (L.) Wahlenb.	1812	≡ hom.
Alsinella biflora (L.) Sw.	1814	≡ hom.
Alsinopsis biflora (L.) Rydb.	1923	≡ hom.
Arenaria diantha Bonnier	1913	= het.
Arenaria sajanensis Willd. ex D.F.K.Schltdl.	1816	≡ hom.
Arenaria scandinavica Spreng.	1825	= het.
Cerastium biflorum (L.) Crantz	1766	≡ hom.
Lidia biflora (L.) Á.Löve & D.Löve	1975	≡ hom.
Minuartia biflora (L.) Schinz & Thell.	1907	≡ hom.
Minuartia sajanensis (Willd. ex D.F.K.Schltdl.) House	1921	≡ hom.
Minuartia sajanensis (Willd. ex D.F.K.Schltdl.) House	1921	≡ hom.
Sabulina biflora (L.) Rchb.	1832	≡ hom.
Stellaria biflora L.	1753	≡ hom.
Notes: ≡ homotypic synonym; = heterotypic synonym

== Range ==
Cherleria biflora is found in the upper subalpine and alpine zones in North America (including in the Rocky Mountains and the Cascades), Central and Northern Europe, and Asia.

== Habitat ==
Cherleria biflora is found in dry, gravelly to rocky slopes in the upper subalpine zone to alpine zone, and in the arctic zone.
