= Athmonum =

Coordinates: 38°03′18″N 23°48′42″E

Athmonum or Athmonon (Ancient Greek: Ἄθμονον), also Athmonia (Ἀθμονία), was a deme of ancient Attica, situated on the site of Marousi (Amarousion). The name of the modern village has been derived from Amarysia, a surname of Artemis, who was worshipped under this designation at Athmonum. An inscription found near Marousi, in which the temenos of this goddess is mentioned, puts the matter beyond dispute. Athmonum also possessed a very ancient temple of Aphrodite Urania. The inhabitants of this deme appear to have been considered clever wine-dressers.

== See also ==
- List of ancient Greek cities
