= Dirfi =

Mountain in Greece

- Δίρφη
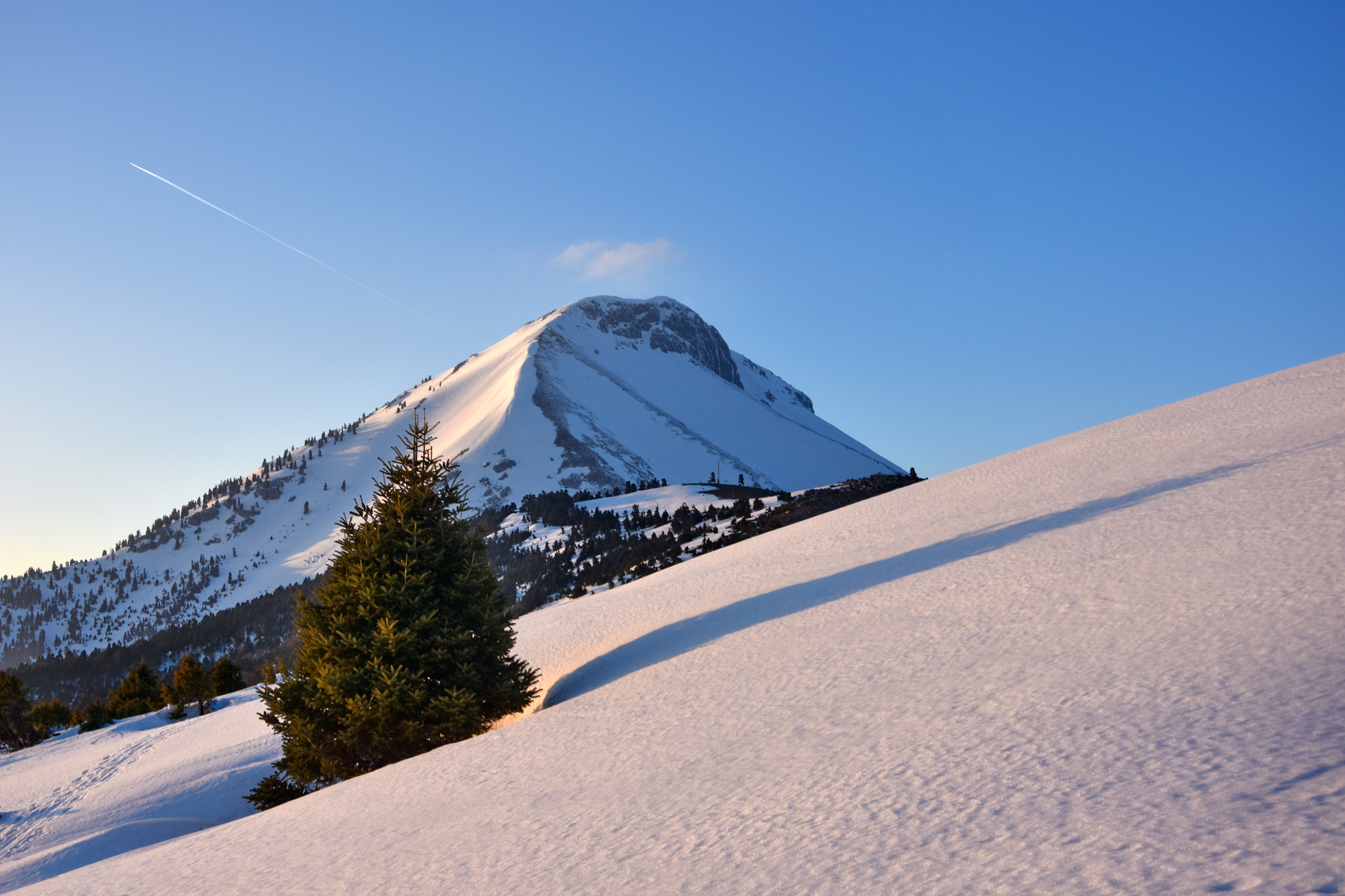
- Delphi, the summit of Dirfys

Highest point
- Elevation: 1,743 m (5,719 ft)
- Prominence: 1,743 m (5,719 ft)
- Listing: Ultra
- Coordinates: 38°37′39″N 23°50′34″E

Geography
- Location within Greece
- Location: central Euboea, Greece

Dirfi (Greek: Δίρφη [ˈðiɾfi]), formerly Dirfys (Ancient Greek: Δίρφῠς [dírpʰys]), is a mountain in the central part of the island of Euboea, in central Greece. At 1,743 m elevation, it is the highest mountain of Euboea. The Dirfi gave its name to the municipal unit Dirfys. Its summit is 4 km west of Stropones, 5 km north of Steni Dirfyos and 28 km northeast of the city of Chalcis. There are forests on the lower slopes while most of the mountain is covered with grassland and in winter with frost and snow.

== Gallery ==
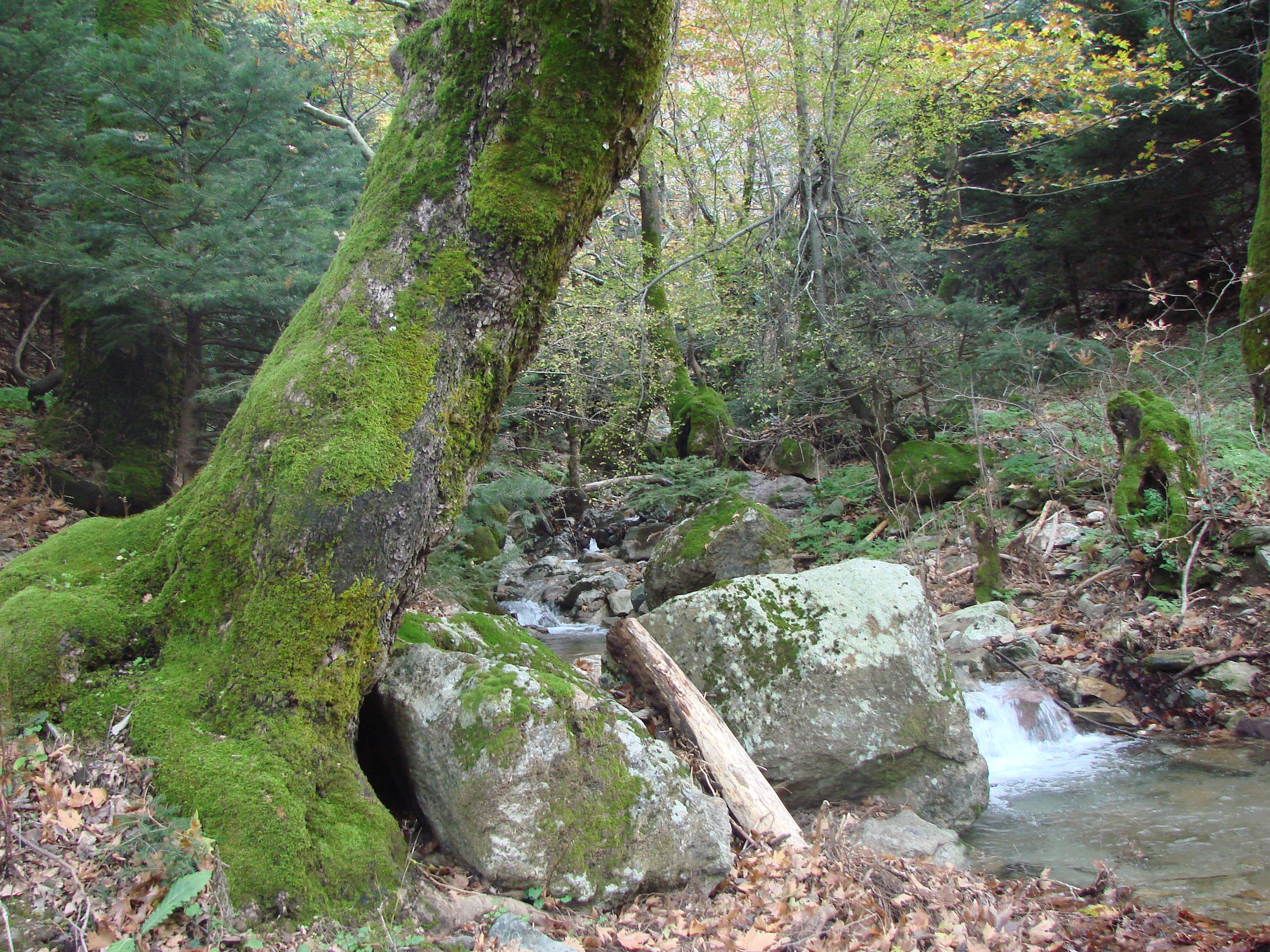
A part of the trekking path located on Dirfi mountain.

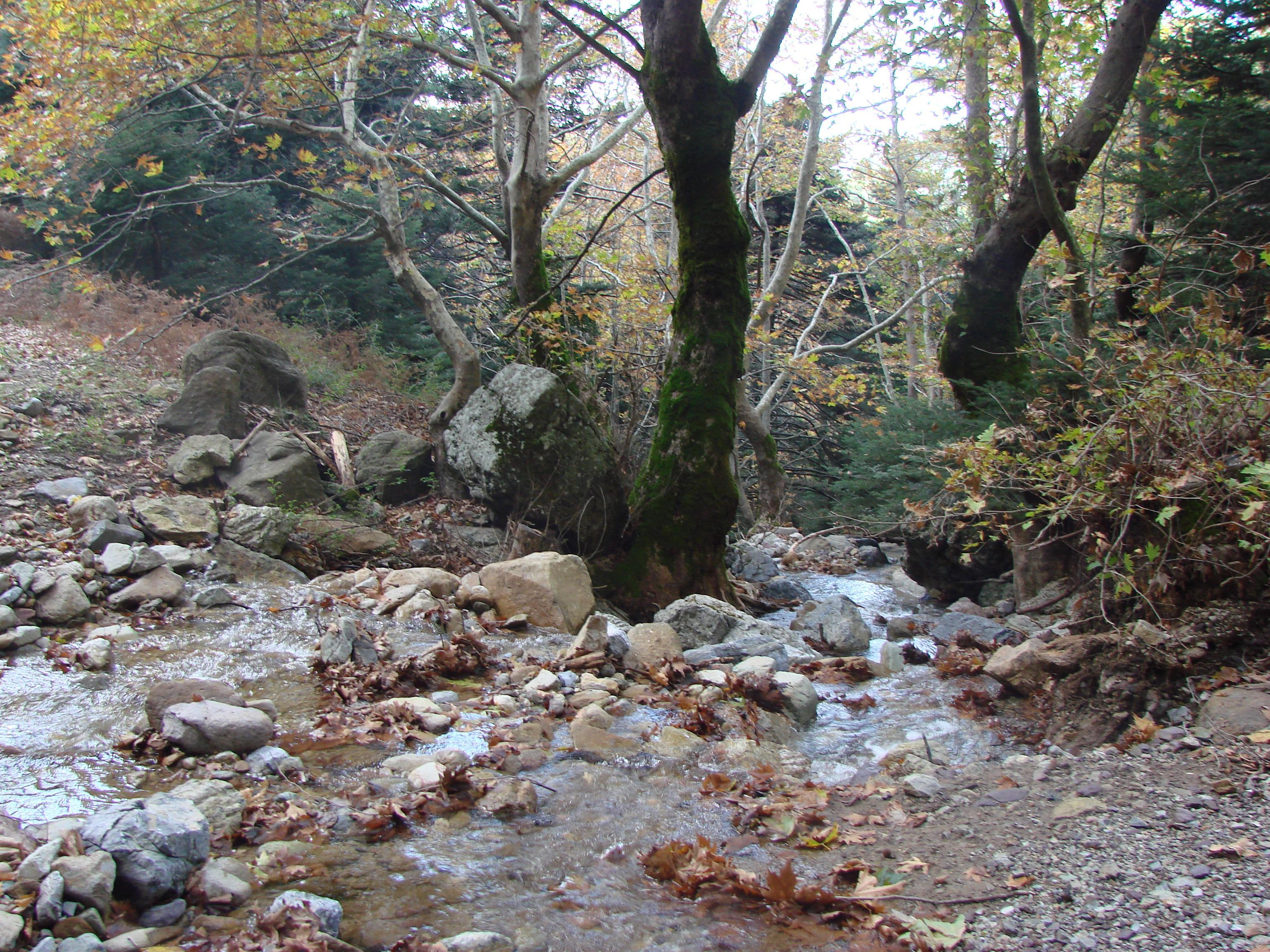
A stream flowing by the Dirfi mountain.

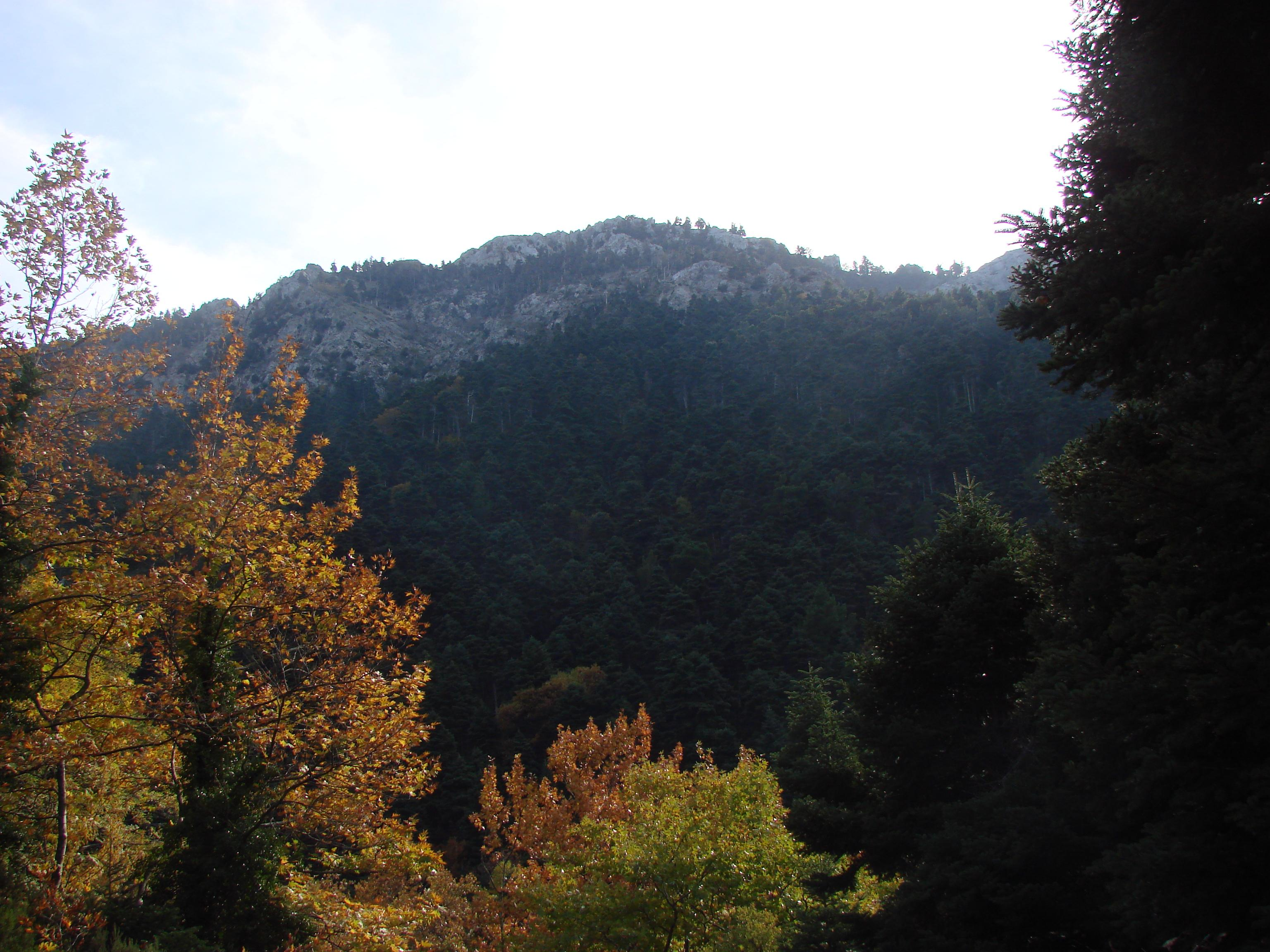
One of the peaks of Dirfi mountain.

== See also ==
- List of European ultra prominent peaks
