= Dirfys-Messapia =

Dirfys-Messapia Δίρφυς-Μεσσάπια
- Municipality
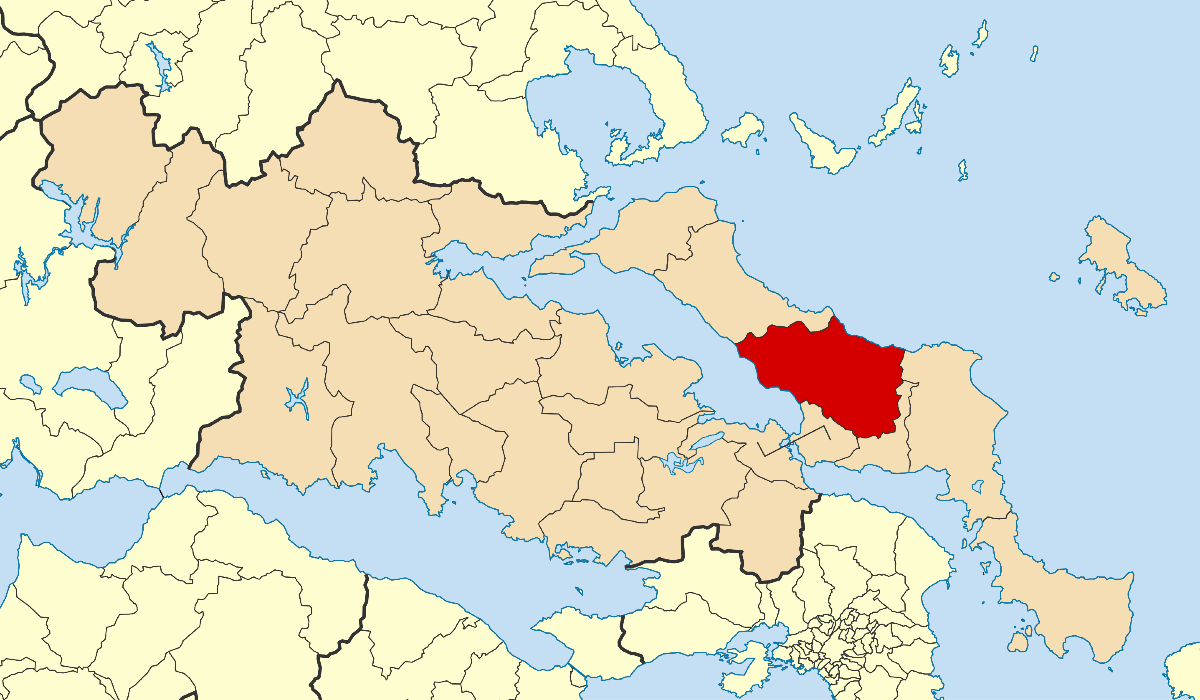

- Location within Greece
- Coordinates: 38°35′N 23°39′E
- Country: Greece
- Administrative region: Central Greece
- Regional unit: Euboea
- Seat: Psachna

Area
  - Municipality: 777.4 km^{2} (300.2 sq mi)

Population (2021)
  - Municipality: 15,934
  - Density: 20.50/km^{2} (53.09/sq mi)
- Time zone: UTC+2 (EET)
  - Summer (DST): UTC+3 (EEST)

Dirfys-Messapia (Greek: Δίρφυς-Μεσσάπια) is a municipality in the Euboea regional unit, Central Greece, Greece. The seat of the municipality is the town Psachna. The municipality has an area of 777.420 km^{2}.

== Municipality ==
The municipality Dirfys-Messapia was formed at the 2011 local government reform by the merger of the following 2 former municipalities, that became municipal units:

- Dirfys
- Messapia
