= Homer Doliver House =

American botanist (1878–1949)

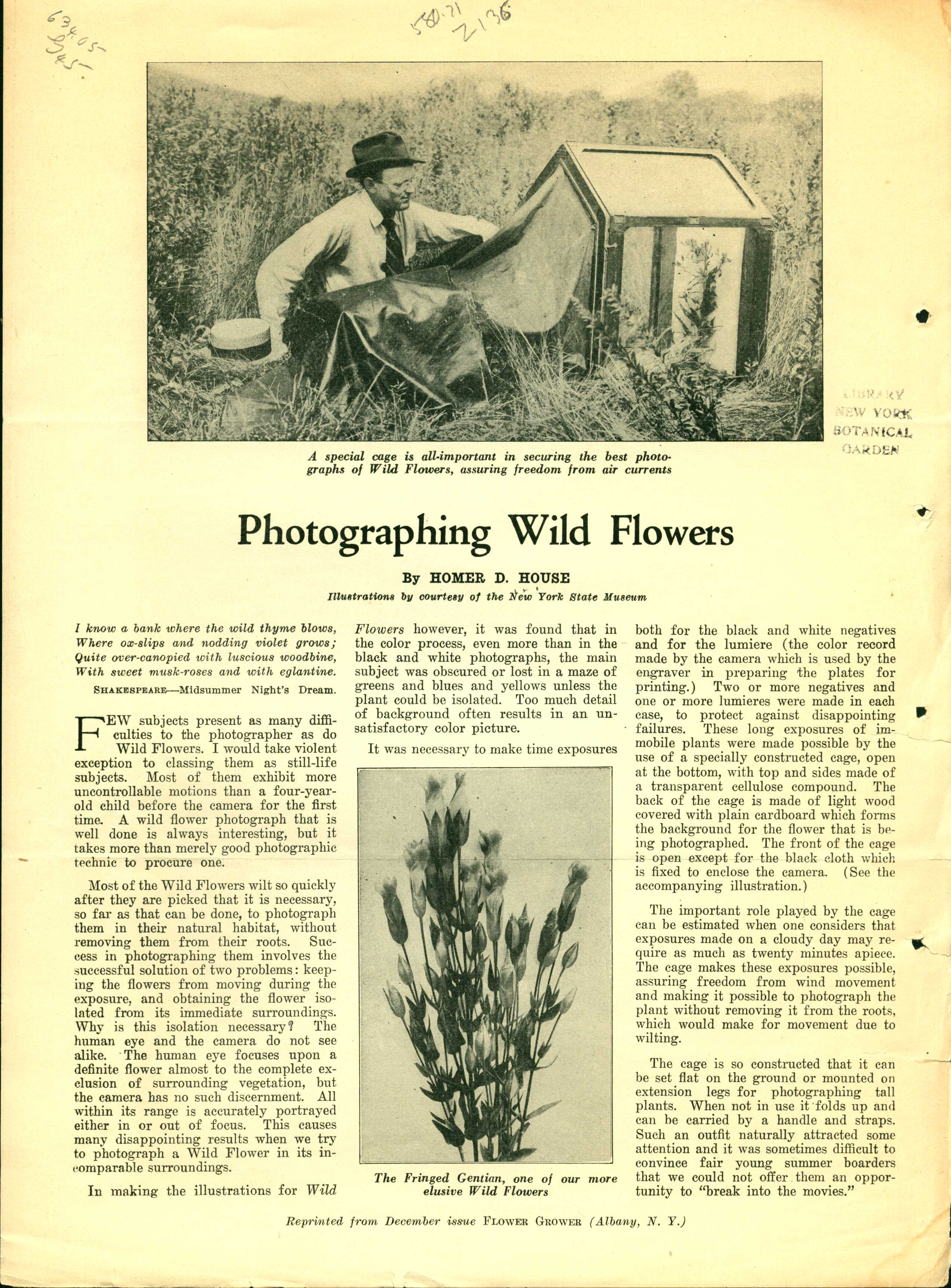
House's article Photographing Wild Flowers in the journal Flower Grower (Albany, N.Y., 1917)

Homer Doliver House (July 21, 1878 - December 21, 1949) was an American botanist from New York State.
