= Saint Nicholas Galatakis Monastery =

- Μονή Αγίου Νικολάου Γαλατάκη

Monastery information
- Established: 8th century
- Dedicated to: Saint Nicholas
- Celebration date: December 6
- Diocese: Metropolis of Chalcis

Site
- Location: Limni, Euboea
- Country: Greece
- Coordinates: 38°43′0″N 23°22′17″E

The Saint Nicholas Galatakis Monastery (Greek: Μονή Αγίου Νικολάου Γαλατάκη) is a monastery located in northern Euboea and very close to the shores of the Northern Euboean gulf, at a distance of 9 km southeast of Limni and 67 km northwest of Chalcis. It is built at an altitude of 110m, with a southeast view of Mount Kandili, while it is considered the oldest monastery of Euboea, which until 1946 was male monastery, and later female. Since 1958 it has been designated an ancient monument.

== Historical evidence ==
According to tradition, the founder of the Monastery is someone from Galata of Constantinople, hence the nickname "Galataki" (although there is also an interpretation from the etymology of the word: milk-cheese), a native master (although the Monastery seems to have existed from in the 8th century AD, built on the ruins of a pre-Christian ancient Greek temple of Poseidon), who around the 10th century, in danger of being drowned by a fierce storm near Mount Kandili, invoked the help of Saint Nicholas. Indeed, the rough sea stopped and "Galatakis" rushed to land, undertaking the construction of a Monastery in honor of Saint Nicholas.

During the period of the Venetian rule in Euboea (1204), the Monastery was destroyed by the fanatical Papists of Boniface of Montferrat. Apart from the pirate attacks and arson attacks, the Monastery in 1470 suffered new disasters from the Turkish conquerors. Finally, with a Turkish firman (1838), he was freed from the Turkish troubles. After the Liberation, a European Company took over the operation of the leucolith mine of the Monastery, thus giving it a great economic boost. From 1950 the Monastery began to function as an orphanage.

The Holy Monastery preserves its ancient church in excellent condition, with its three distinct parts (narthex, main church - "catholic" - and Holy Vima) and its famous frescoes, which were completed in 1567 with the financial contribution of Master Francis Fragomustakis, who had also been miraculously saved from a severe storm. The large temple of the Monastery is of the Byzantine style. It was rebuilt in 1557. The spacious narthex, massive and heavy, was later (17th century) attached to the church.

The Monastery has many relics of Saints (Andrew, Nicholas, Menas, Charalambοs, David, John the Forerunner, Mary Magdalene, Tryphon, Modestus, Cyricus, Pantaleon, Great Basil, Cosmas and Damian, John Chrysostom, Theodore Stratelates, Mamandos, Kyriakos, Stephen).

Also, the Holy Monastery has a chapel named after the Holy Forerunner on the right side of the Narthex. Next to the entrance of the Chapel there is also a Crypt with 18 steps.

Finally, the Galataki Monastery also has many shares (Our Lady of Politics, Archangel, Transfiguration of the Savior, Dormition of Theotokos, Saint George).

== Administrative data ==
As a settlement it is officially mentioned, after the Greek revolution of 1821 and the integration of Evia, in 1835 to be annexed to the then municipality of Aegaion. According to the Kallikratis plan, along with Limni, Katounia, Myrtia, Retsinolakkos, Sepia and Chronia, they form the municipal community of Limni, which is part of the municipal unit of Elymnia of Mantoudi-Limni-Agia Anna and according to the 2011 census there are 6 nuns.

== Sources ==
- Αλβανάκης, Διονύσιος Σ. Ιστορία των Ιερών Μονών του Κράτους. τ. 2: Ιερά Μονή Γαλατάκη (Επισκοπή Ευβοίας) Εν Αθήναις :Εκ των Τυπογραφικών Καταστημάτων Α. Παπασπύρου - Ιω. Δεουδέ, 1906.
