= Euboean League =

League of city-states in ancient Greece

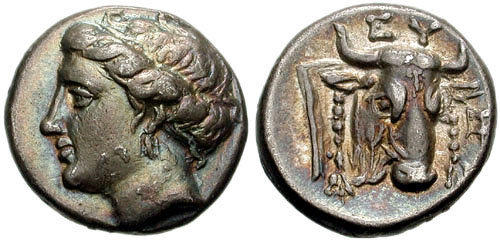
Silver drachma of the Euboean League. Obverse: Head of the nymph Euboea. Reverse: Bull's head and kantharos, with the inscription EY[ΒΟΙΕΩΝ] "of the Euboeans".

The Euboean League (Ancient Greek: τὸ κοινὸν τῶν Εὐβοιέων, to koinon tōn Euboieōn) was a federal league (koinon) of the cities of Euboea in ancient Greece, extant from the 3rd century BC to the late 3rd century AD.

The League is first attested during the reign of Demetrios Poliorketes (r. 294–288 BC), but is not mentioned again until it was formed again in 194 BC and later in 30 AD. Based on its coinage, it survived until well into the Roman Empire, until its dissolution by Emperor Diocletian (r. 284–305) in 297 AD. It was a full federation (sympoliteia) of city-states, with its own boule and ecclesia, federal laws, common coinage (although the member cities continued to mint their own coins), and the right to grant proxenia. The League was headed by an official called hegemon, whose name featured on federal coinage.

== Sources ==
- Schwahn, Walther (1931). "Sympoliteia". Realencyclopädie der Classischen Altertumswissenschaft. Vol. Band IV, Halbband 7, Stoa–Symposion. col. 1171–1266.
- Papamichael, Stamatis (2002). Post-Christian Karystos (in Greek). Ε & Π ΤΑΜΒΑΚΟΣ Ο.Ε. ISBN 960-90995-1-3.
