= Petalioi Gulf =

Gulf of the Aegean Sea, Greece

Coordinates: 38°00′N 24°05′E

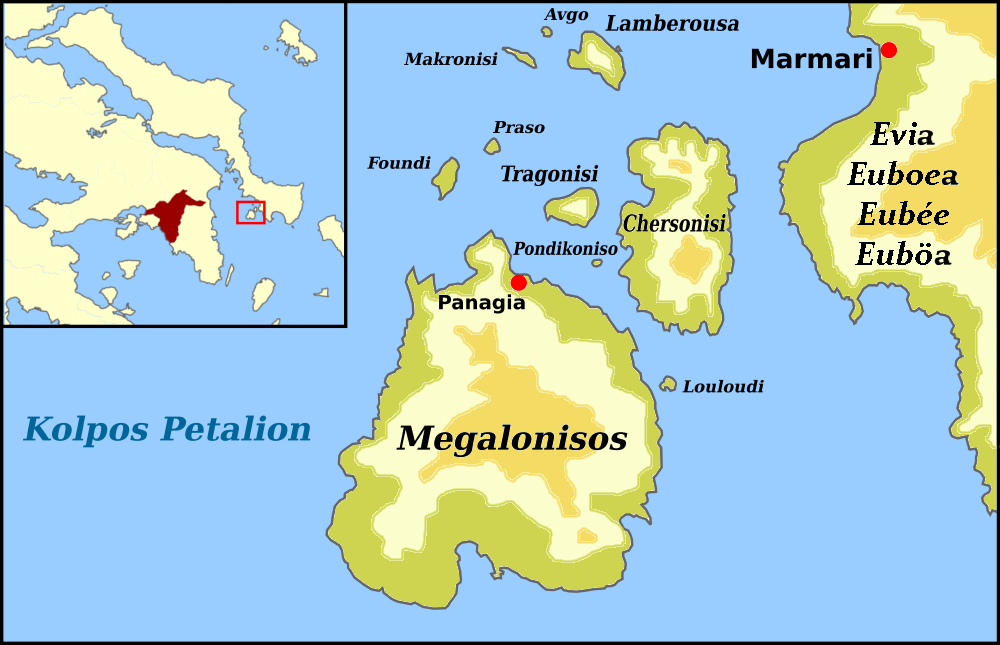
Petalioi Gulf (Kolpos Petalion) and Islands

The Petalioi Gulf (Greek: Κόλπος Πεταλιών - Kolpos Petalion) is a gulf of the Aegean Sea, Greece. It stretches between the east coast of Attica and the south tip of the island Euboea. It takes its name from the Petalioi islands, that are situated in the northeastern part of the Gulf, off the Euboean coast. The Petalioi Gulf is connected to the South Euboean Gulf to the north. Its length is approximately 50 km long from north to south and its width is approximately 5 km in the north to about 50 km in the south. There are several uninhabited islands in the gulf, including the Petalioi and Makronisos. Promontories include Strongylo and Vigla in the island of Euboea.

== Places by the gulf ==
- In Attica (from south to north):
  - Lavrio
  - Porto Rafti
  - Artemida
  - Rafina
  - Nea Makri
  - Agia Marina
- In Euboea (from northwest to southeast):
  - Styra
  - Marmari
  - Karystos
