= 1119 Euboea =

Background asteroid

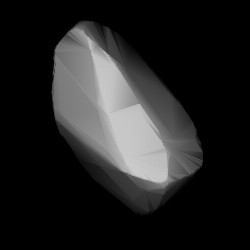
- Shape model of Euboea from its lightcurve

Discovery
- Discovered by: K. Reinmuth
- Discovery site: Heidelberg Obs.
- Discovery date: 27 October 1927

Designations
- Pronunciation: /juːˈbiːə/
- Named after: Euboea (Greek island)
- Alternative designations: 1927 UB
- Minor planet category: main-belt · (middle); background

Orbital characteristics
- Epoch 4 September 2017 (JD 2458000.5)
- Uncertainty parameter 0
- Observation arc: 90.10 yr (32,908 days)
- Aphelion: 3.0172 AU
- Perihelion: 2.2036 AU
- Semi-major axis: 2.6104 AU
- Eccentricity: 0.1558
- Orbital period (sidereal): 4.22 yr (1,540 days)
- Mean anomaly: 190.40°
- Mean motion: 0° 14^{m} 1.32^{s} / day
- Inclination: 7.8583°
- Longitude of ascending node: 57.381°
- Argument of perihelion: 230.16°

Physical characteristics
- Dimensions: 18.37±4.84 km 25.10±8.95 km 29.443±0.279 km 31.46 km (derived); 31.881±0.199 km 31.90±0.38 km
- Synodic rotation period: 11.396±0.001 h 11.3981±0.0005 h 11.39823±0.00001 h 11.41±0.01 h
- Geometric albedo: 0.0539 (derived); 0.0576±0.0081; 0.058±0.002; 0.09±0.06; 0.15±0.07; 0.213±0.044
- Spectral type: S (assumed)
- Absolute magnitude (H): 11.20 · 11.30 · 11.32

1119 Euboea (/juːˈbiːə/; prov. designation: 1927 UB) is a background asteroid from the central region of the asteroid belt. It was discovered on 27 October 1927, by German astronomer Karl Reinmuth at the Heidelberg-Königstuhl State Observatory in southwest Germany. The asteroid has a rotation period of 11.4 hours and measures approximately 30 kilometers (19 miles) in diameter. It was named for the Greek island of Euboea.

== Orbit and classification ==
Euboea is a non-family asteroid of the main belt's background population when applying the hierarchical clustering method to its proper orbital elements. It orbits the Sun in the central asteroid belt at a distance of 2.2–3.0 AU once every 4 years and 3 months (1,540 days; semi-major axis of 2.61 AU). Its orbit has an eccentricity of 0.16 and an inclination of 8° with respect to the ecliptic. The body's observation arc begins with a recovered observation from the Lowell Observatory in April 1930, more than 2 years after to its official discovery observation.

== Naming ==
This minor planet was named after Euboea, also known as "Negropont", the largest island of Greece in the Aegean Sea. The naming was mentioned in The Names of the Minor Planets by Paul Herget in 1955 (H 105).

== Physical characteristics ==
Euboea is an assumed stony S-type asteroid.

=== Rotation period and poles ===
In October 2007, a first rotational lightcurve of Euboea was obtained from photometric observations by astronomers at the Oakley Southern Sky Observatory in Australia. Lightcurve analysis gave a rotation period of 11.41 hours with a brightness variation of 0.50 magnitude (U=3). In April 2010, a similar period of 11.396 hours and an amplitude of 0.46 magnitude was measured by French amateur astronomer Pierre Antonini (U=3).

In 2016, two modeled lightcurves were published using photometric data from the Lowell Photometric Database and other sources. They gave a concurring sidereal period of 11.3981 and 11.39823 hours, respectively. Each study also determined two respective spin axes of (79.0°, 75.0°) and (282.0°, 55.0°), and (71.0°, 61.0°) and (280.0°, 54.0°) in ecliptic coordinates (λ, β).

=== Diameter and albedo ===
According to the surveys carried out by the Japanese Akari satellite and the NEOWISE mission of NASA's Wide-field Infrared Survey Explorer, Euboea measures between 18.37 and 31.90 kilometers in diameter and its surface has an albedo between 0.0576 and 0.213. The Collaborative Asteroid Lightcurve Link derives a low albedo of 0.0539 – typical for carbonaceous C-type asteroids – and a diameter of 31.46 kilometers based on an absolute magnitude of 11.3.
