= Petalioi =

Island complex southeast of Euboea

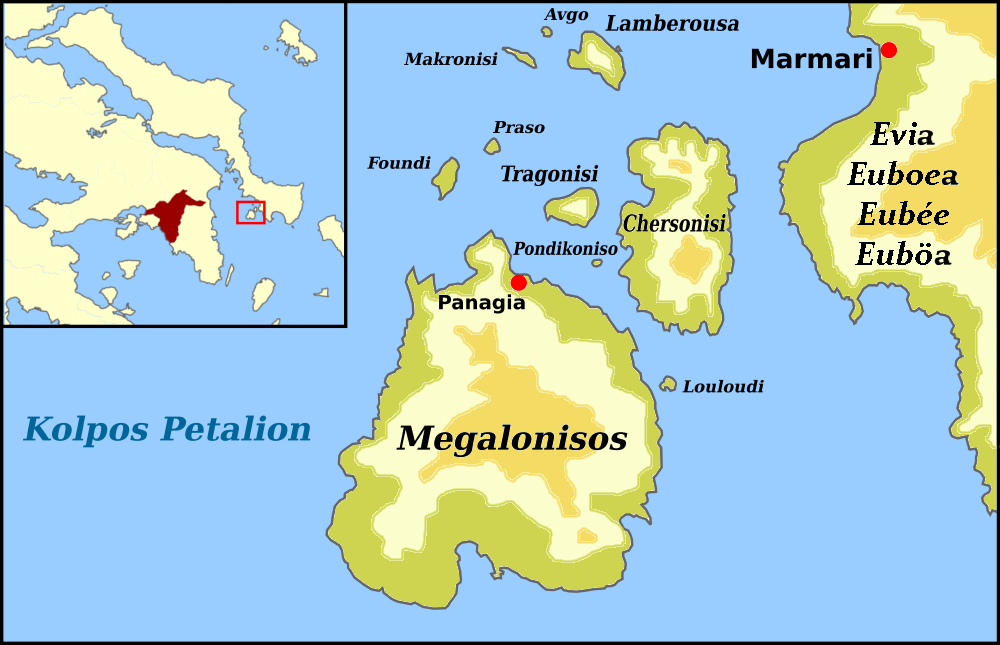
- Map of Petalioi

- Location within Greece

Geography
- Location: Euboean Sea
- Coordinates: 38.0116°N 24.2636°E
- Total islands: 10

Administration
- Greece
- Region: Central Greece
- Regional unit: Euboea
- Municipality: Karystos

Demographics
- Population: 1 (2011)

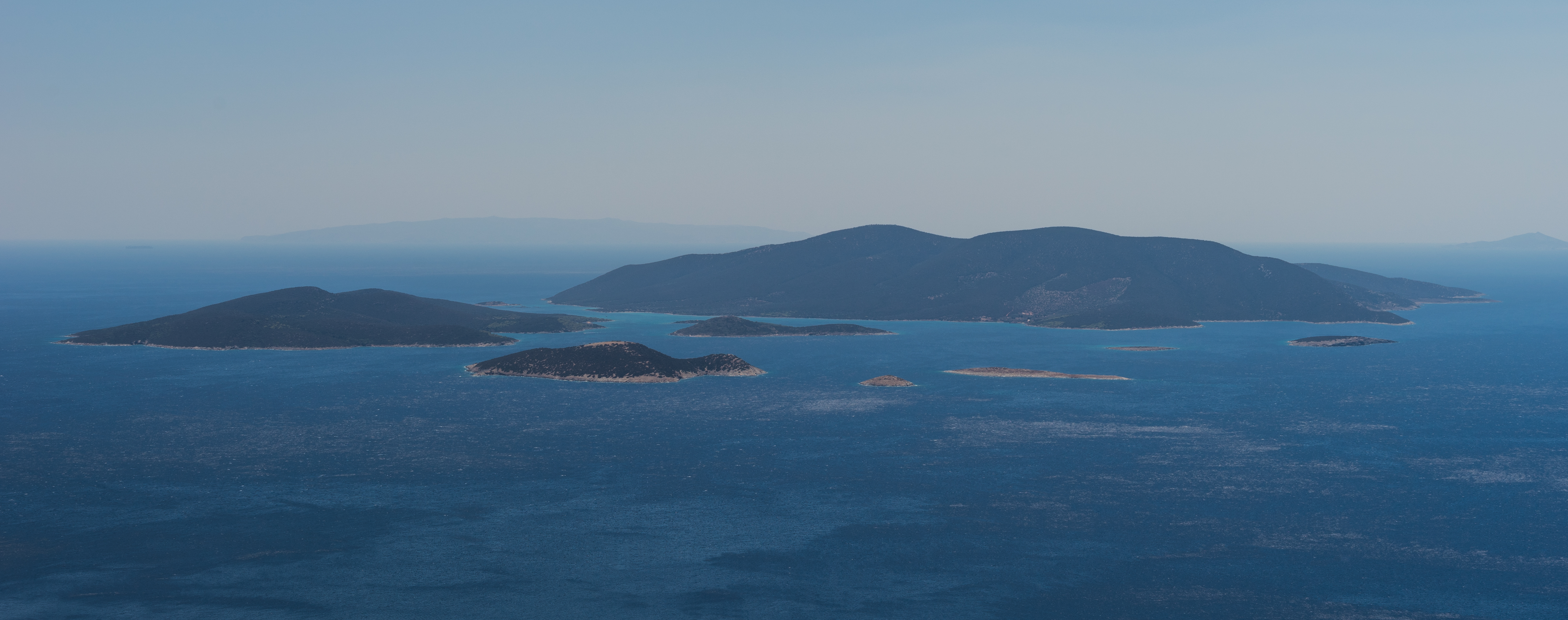
Petalioi archipelago

Petalioi (Greek: Πεταλιοί) is an island complex southeast of Euboea, Greece, in the Petalioi Gulf of the Euboean Sea. It consists of ten small islands and islets, almost all of which are uninhabited.

The total area of the complex is 22.5 km^{2} (8.7 mi^{2}). Administratively, the islands belong to the municipality of Karystos, in the municipal unit of Marmari. The islands of the complex are Megalonisos, Chersonisi, Avgo, Lamperousa, Louloudi, Makronisi, Pontikoniso, Praso, Tragos and Founti.

The largest of them is Megalonisos. It has an area of 17 km^{2} (6.6 mi^{2}) and is uninhabited. Most of the islands are privately owned and belong to Greek shipowners.

== History ==
The name Petalioi derives from Petalios, the name of Megalonisos (the largest island) in antiquity. In modern times, the islands were the property of the Greek royal family. In 1915 or 1916, prince George II sold the islands to the Greek shipowner Maris Empeirikos.
