= Demetrios Magiros =

Greek-American mathematician

Demetrios G. Magiros (Δημήτριος Γ. Μαγείρος, 19 December 1912, Euboea, Greece – 19 January 1982, Philadelphia, Pennsylvania) was a Greek-American mathematician, specializing in the stability of dynamical systems.

== Education and career ==
Magiros did his undergraduate and graduate study at the University of Athens (National and Kapodistrian University of Athens), where he received his doctorate in pure mathematics in 1940. At the National Technical University of Athens he was appointed a lecturer in mechanics and geodesy and subsequently was promoted to professor of mathematics. During WW II he published no papers but in 1946 he published three papers on the catenary. In 1949 he went to the USA. There he studied applied mathematics at Brown University, at the Courant Institute of Mathematical Sciences, and at Massachusetts Institute of Technology (MIT). After holding research positions at Columbia University's IBM Thomas J. Watson Research Laboratory, the Republic Aviation Corporation, and at the Courant Institute, he was appointed professor of mathematics and mechanics at Hofstra University. When he was a professor at Hofstra, he was also a consultant for the General Electric Company's Missile and Space Vehicle Department at the Valley Forge Technology Center. In 1960 he resigned from Hofstra University to work full-time as a researcher at General Electric's Missile and Space Vehicle Department. He worked for General Electric Aerospace for the remainder of his career.

During his career Magiros published 54 papers, 2 of them in the Proceedings of the National Academy of Sciences. In 2012 a book containing a selection of 43 of his papers was published with Spyros G. Tzafestas as editor. The book is organized into three parts: mathematics applied to engineering modelling and social issues (with 11 papers), nonlinear mechanics (with 18 papers), and dynamic systems analysis (with 12 papers), plus an appendix with 2 papers published in Soviet mathematical journals. The section on nonlinear mechanics contains 8 papers on celestial and orbital mechanics. The section on dynamical systems analysis contains 6 papers on stability analysis, 4 on precessional phenomena, and 2 on separatrices of dynamical systems.

== Selected publications ==
- Magiros, Demetrios G. (1958). "Subharmonics of any order in nonlinear systems of one degree of freedom: Application to subharmonics of order 1/3". Information and Control. 1 (3): 198–227. doi:10.1016/S0019-9958(58)80002-9.
- Magiros, Demetrios G. (1959). "On a problem of nonlinear mechanics". Information and Control. 2 (3): 297–309. doi:10.1016/S0019-9958(59)90239-6.
- Magiros, D. G. (1960). "A Method for Defining Principal Modes of Nonlinear Systems Utilizing Infinite Determinants". Proceedings of the National Academy of Sciences. 46 (12): 1608–1611. Bibcode:1960PNAS...46.1608M. doi:10.1073/pnas.46.12.1608. PMC 223090. PMID 16590791.
- Keller, Joseph B.; Magiros, Demetrios G. (1961). "Diffraction by a semi-infinite screen with a rounded end". Communications on Pure and Applied Mathematics. 14 (3): 457–471. doi:10.1002/cpa.3160140321.
- Magiros, Demetrios G. (1961). "Method for Defining Principal Modes of Nonlinear Systems Utilizing Infinite Determinants". Journal of Mathematical Physics. 2 (6): 869–875. Bibcode:1961JMP.....2..869M. doi:10.1063/1.1724234. PMC 221664.
- Magiros, Demetrios G. (1963). "The impulsive force required to effectuate a new orbit through a given point in space". Journal of the Franklin Institute. 276 (6): 475–489. doi:10.1016/0016-0032(63)90493-9.
- Magiros, D. G. (1965). "On Stability Definitions of Dynamical Systems". Proceedings of the National Academy of Sciences. 53 (6): 1288–1294. Bibcode:1965PNAS...53.1288M. doi:10.1073/pnas.53.6.1288. PMC 219835. PMID 16578606.
- Magiros, D. G. (1974). "On the stability of a class of precessions". Amsterdam International Astronautical Federation Congress. Bibcode:1974amst.iafcR....M.
- Magiros, Demetrios G.; Reehl, George (1985). "ΜΑΘΗΜΑΤΙΚΑ.—The Entry Problem". In: Selected Papers of Demetrios G. Magiros. Dordrecht: Springer. pp. 345–350. doi:10.1007/978-94-009-5368-0_29. ISBN 978-94-010-8869-5. (reprinted from 1966 original in Proceedings of the Athens Academy of Sciences — George H. Reehl (1923–2012) was an electrical engineer employed by General Electric. "Obituary. George H. Reehl". Albany Times Union. September 18, 2012.)
