= Euboea =

Second-largest Greek island

Native name: Εύβοια
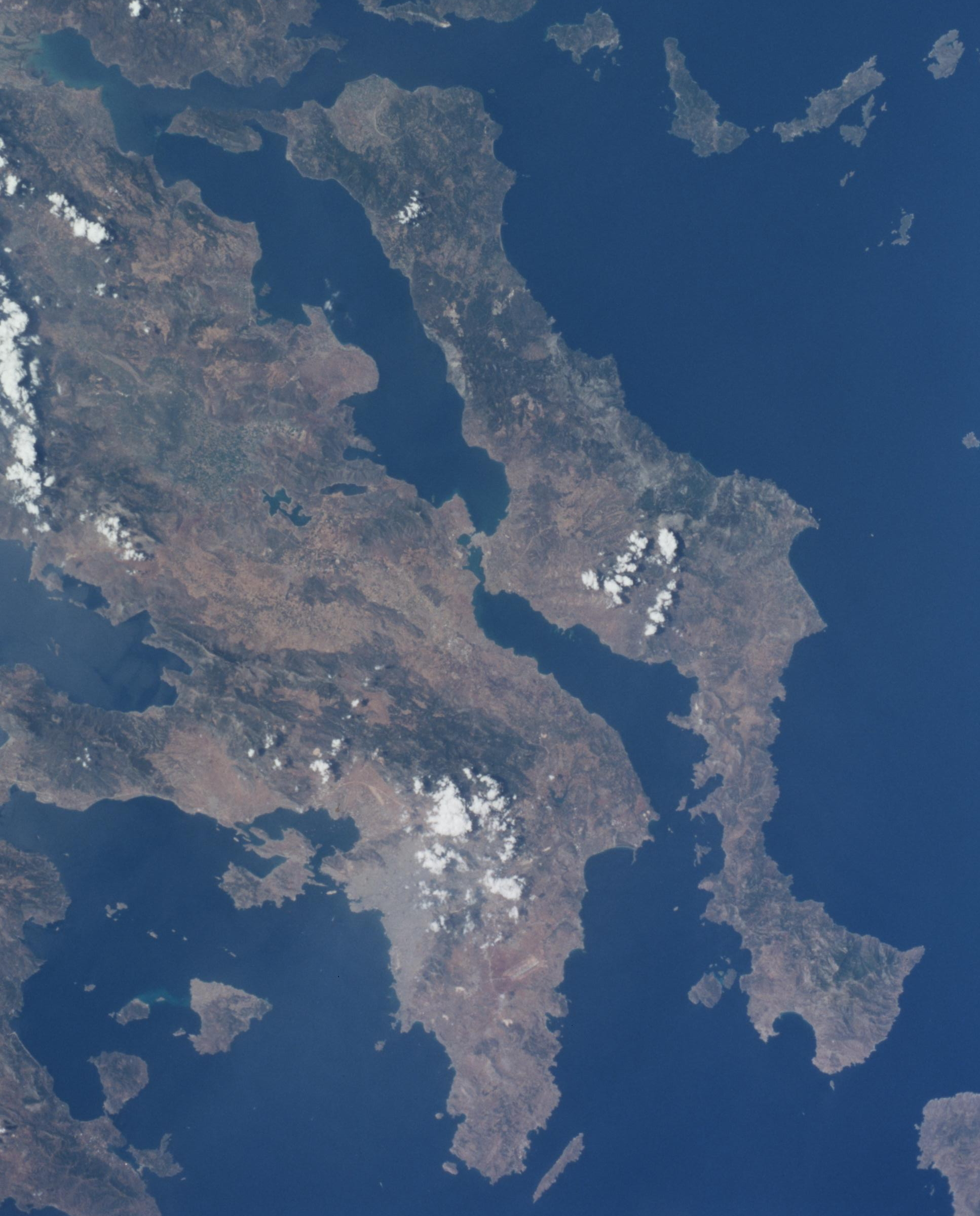
- NASA picture of Central Greece with Euboea lying to the right

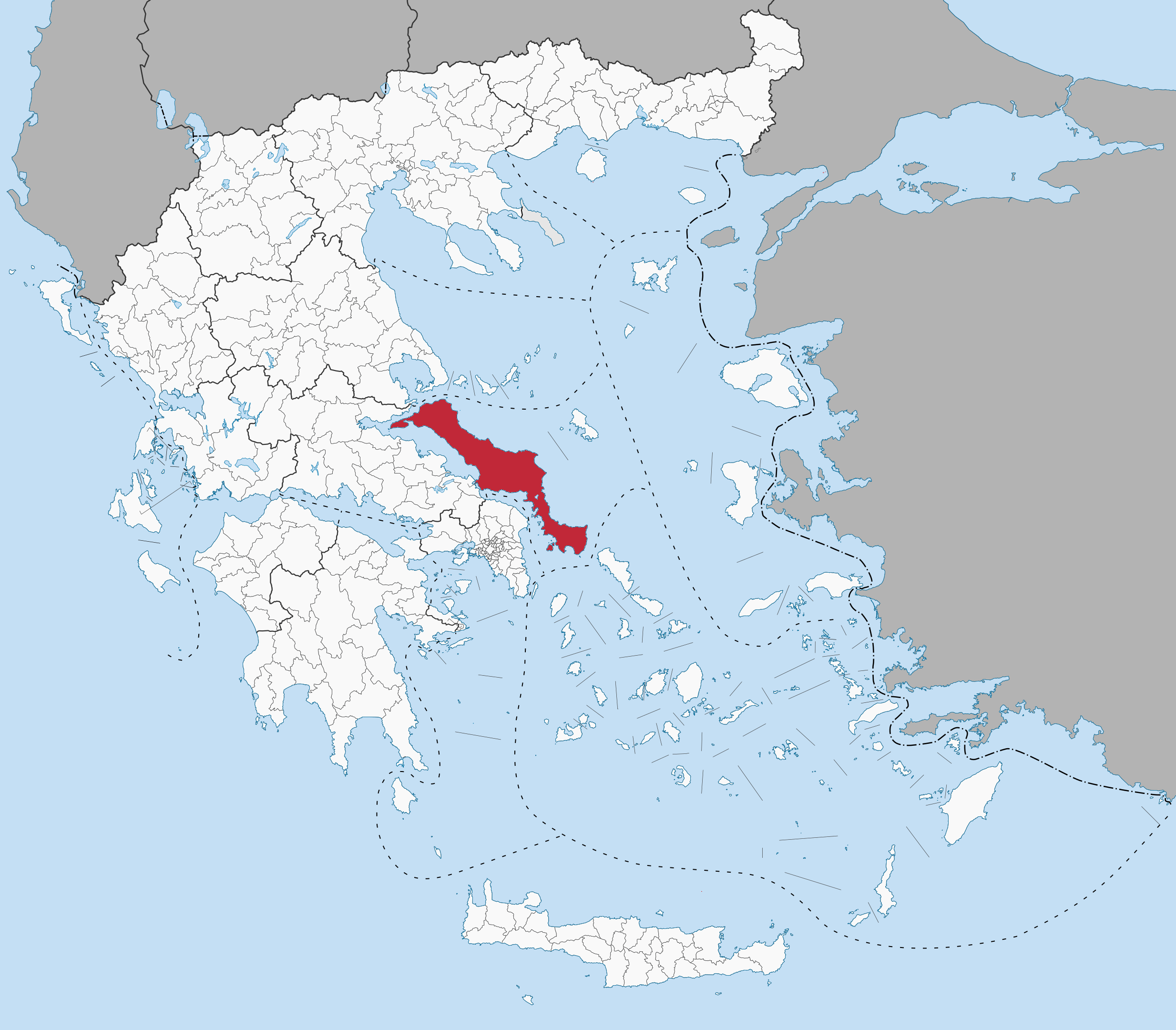

Geography
- Coordinates: 38°30′N 24°00′E
- Archipelago: Aegean Islands
- Area: 3,684 km^{2} (1,422 sq mi)
- Highest elevation: 1,743 m (5719 ft)
- Highest point: Dirfi

Administration
- Greece
- Region: Central Greece
- Regional unit: Euboea
- Municipality: Εύβοια
- Capital city: Chalcis

Demographics
- Population: 204,818 (2021)
- Pop. density: 54/km^{2} (140/sq mi)

Additional information
- Postal code: 34x xx
- Area code: 22x0
- Vehicle registration: XA
- Official website: www.naevias.gr

Euboea, (Note: /juːˈbiːə/ yoo-BEE-ə; Ancient Greek: Εὔβοια, romanized: Eúboia, IPA: [ěu̯boi̯a]) also known as Evia, (Note: /ˈɛviə/ EV-ee-ə; Modern Greek: Εύβοια, IPA: [ˈevi.a]) is the second-largest Greek island in area and population, after Crete, and the sixth largest island in the Mediterranean Sea. It is separated from Boeotia in mainland Greece by the narrow Euripus Strait (only 40 m (130 ft) at its narrowest point), the North Euboean Gulf, and the South Euboean Gulf. In general outline it is a long and narrow island; it is about 180 km (110 mi) long, and varies in breadth from 50 km (31 mi) to 6 km (3.7 mi). Its geographic orientation is from northwest to southeast, and it is traversed throughout its length by a mountain range, which forms part of the chain that bounds Thessaly on the east, and is continued south of Euboia in the lofty islands of Andros, Tinos and Mykonos.

It forms most of the regional unit of Euboea, which also includes Skyros and a small area of the Greek mainland.

== Name ==
Like most of the Greek islands, Euboea was known by other names in antiquity, such as Macris (Μάκρις) and Doliche (Δολίχη) from its elongated shape, or Ellopia (after Ellops the son of Ion), Aonia and Abantis from the tribes inhabiting it, or Ocha/Oche (Ὄχη), which is also the name of one of the highest mountains on the island. The name Euboea (Εὔβοια) derives from the words εὖ 'good', and βοῦς 'ox', meaning '(the land of) the well(-fed) oxen'. Strabo writes that it took the name Euboea either from the heroine Euboea or because of a cave on the island at the Aegaean coast which was called Boösaule (βοὸς αὐλὴ, meaning 'cow's stall'), where Io was said to have given birth to Epaphus.

In the Middle Ages, the island was often referred to by Byzantine authors as Chalcis (Χαλκίς), the name of its capital, or Euripos (Εὔριπος), the name of the strait that separates the island from the Greek mainland; but the ancient name Euboea remained in use by classicizing authors until the 16th century.

The phrase στὸν Εὔριπον 'to Evripos', rebracketed as στὸ Νεὔριπον 'to Nevripos', became Negroponte ('Black Bridge') in Italian by folk etymology, the ponte 'bridge' being interpreted as the bridge of Chalcis. This name was most relevant when the island was under Venetian rule. That name entered common use in the West in the 13th century, with other variants being Egripons, Negripo, and Negropont.

Under Ottoman rule, the island and its capital were known as Eğriboz or Ağriboz, again after the Euripos strait.

== Geography and climate ==
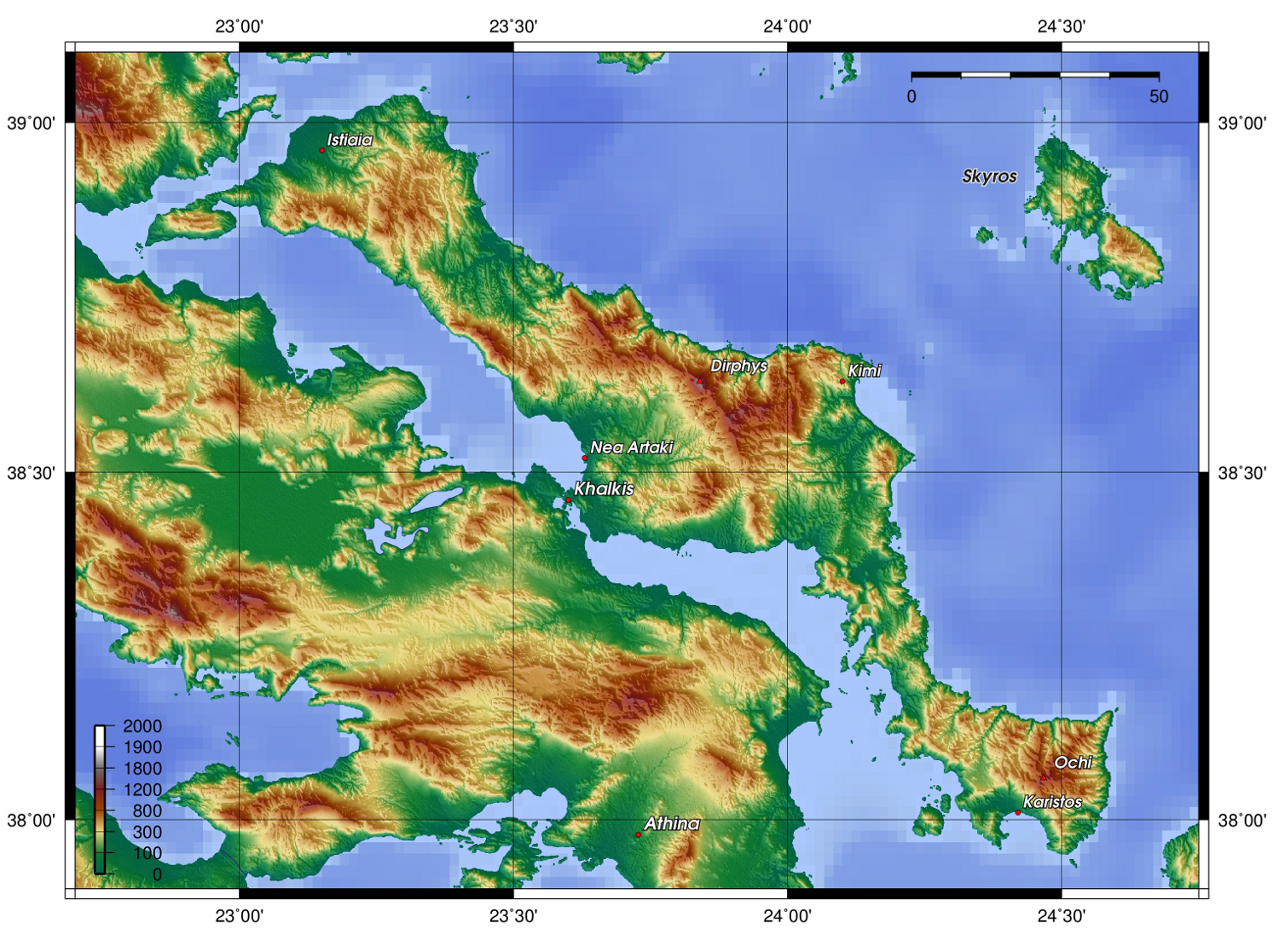
Topography of Euboea and parts of the Greek mainland.

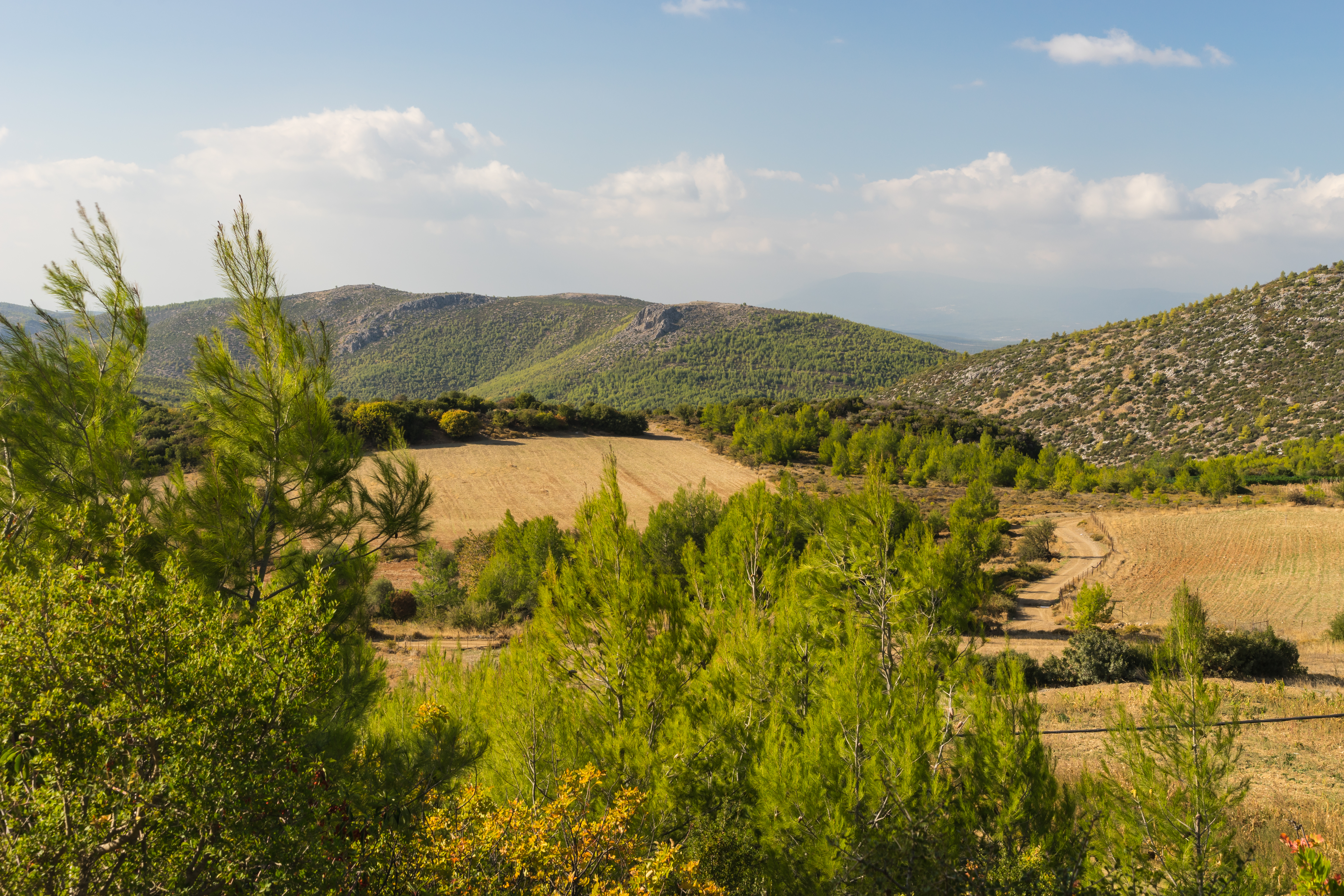
Landscape near Eretria

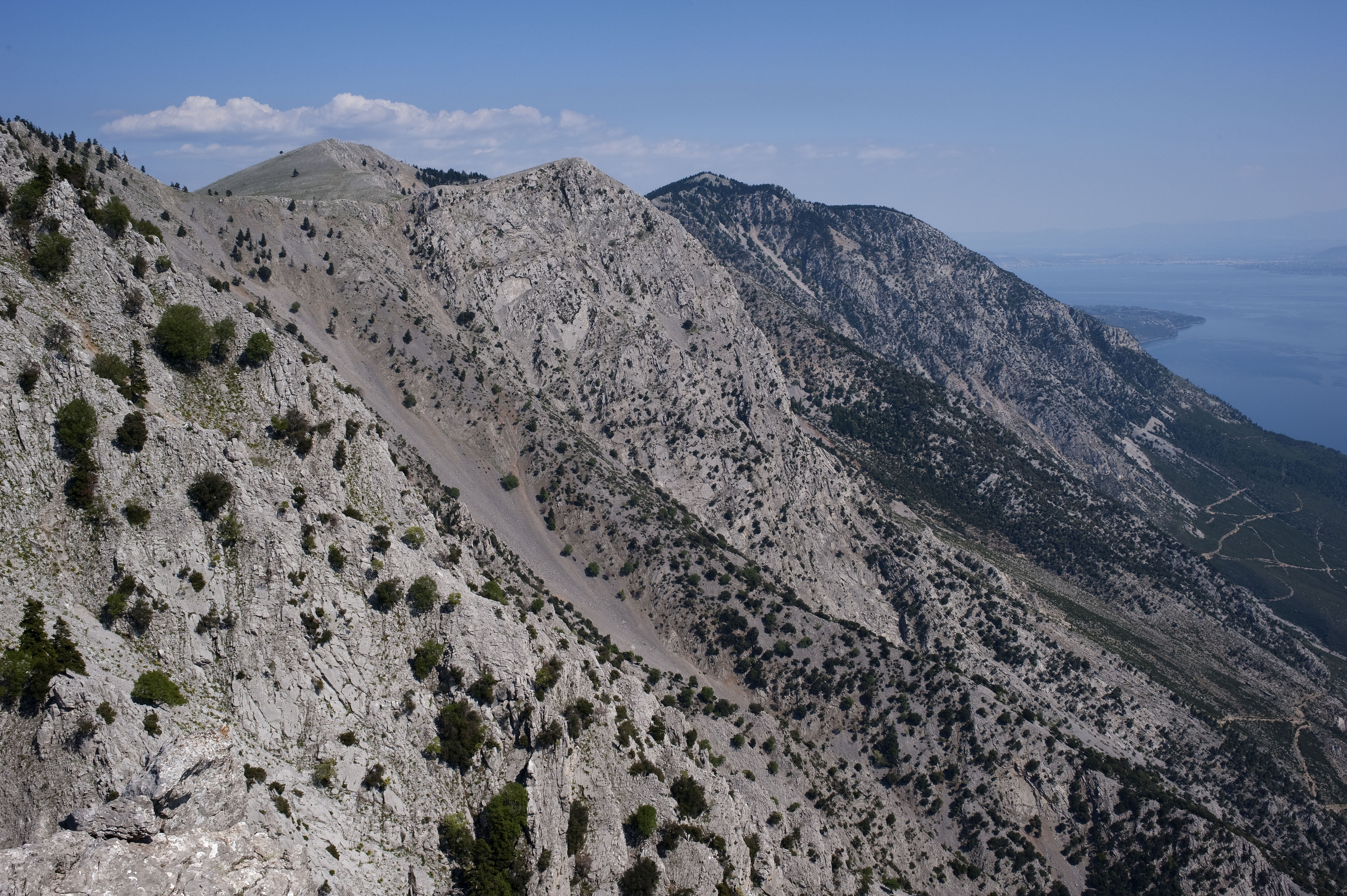
View of Kantili mountain.

Euboea was believed to have originally formed part of the mainland, and to have been separated from it by an earthquake. This is fairly probable, because it lies in the neighbourhood of a fault line, and both Thucydides and Strabo write that the northern part of the island had been shaken at different periods. In the neighbourhood of Chalcis, both to the north and the south, the bays are so confined as to make plausible the story of Agamemnon's fleet having been detained there by contrary winds. The Euripus Strait is narrowest, only 40 m, at Chalcis itself. The extraordinary changes of tide that take place in this passage have been a subject of note since classical times, and it was so feared by sailors that the principal line of traffic from the north of the Aegean to Athens used to bypass Chalcis and the Euboic Sea. At one moment the current runs like a river in one direction, and shortly afterwards with equal velocity in the other. A bridge was first constructed here in the twenty-first year of the Peloponnesian War (410 BC).

Geography and nature divide the island itself into three distinct parts: the fertile and forested north (which suffered major damage in the August 2021 forest fires); the forested mountainous centre, with agriculture limited to the coastal valleys; and the barren south.

The main mountains include Dirfi (1,743 m (5,719 ft)), Kantili (1,246 m (4,088 ft)), Pyxaria (1,341 m (4,400 ft)) in the northeast and Ochi (1,394 m (4,573 ft)) in the south. The neighboring gulfs are the Pagasetic Gulf in the north, the Malian Gulf and North Euboean Gulf in the west, and the South Euboean Gulf and Petalion Gulf in the south. The Petalioi archipelago lies to the southwest, while the Monilia islands lie to the west.

With a total land area of 3,684 km^{2} (1,422 sq mi), the island had a population of 198,130 at the 2001 census.

Most of the island features a hot-summer Mediterranean climate (Köppen climate classification: Csa) with hot, dry summers and cool, wet winters.

== History ==
=== Antiquity ===
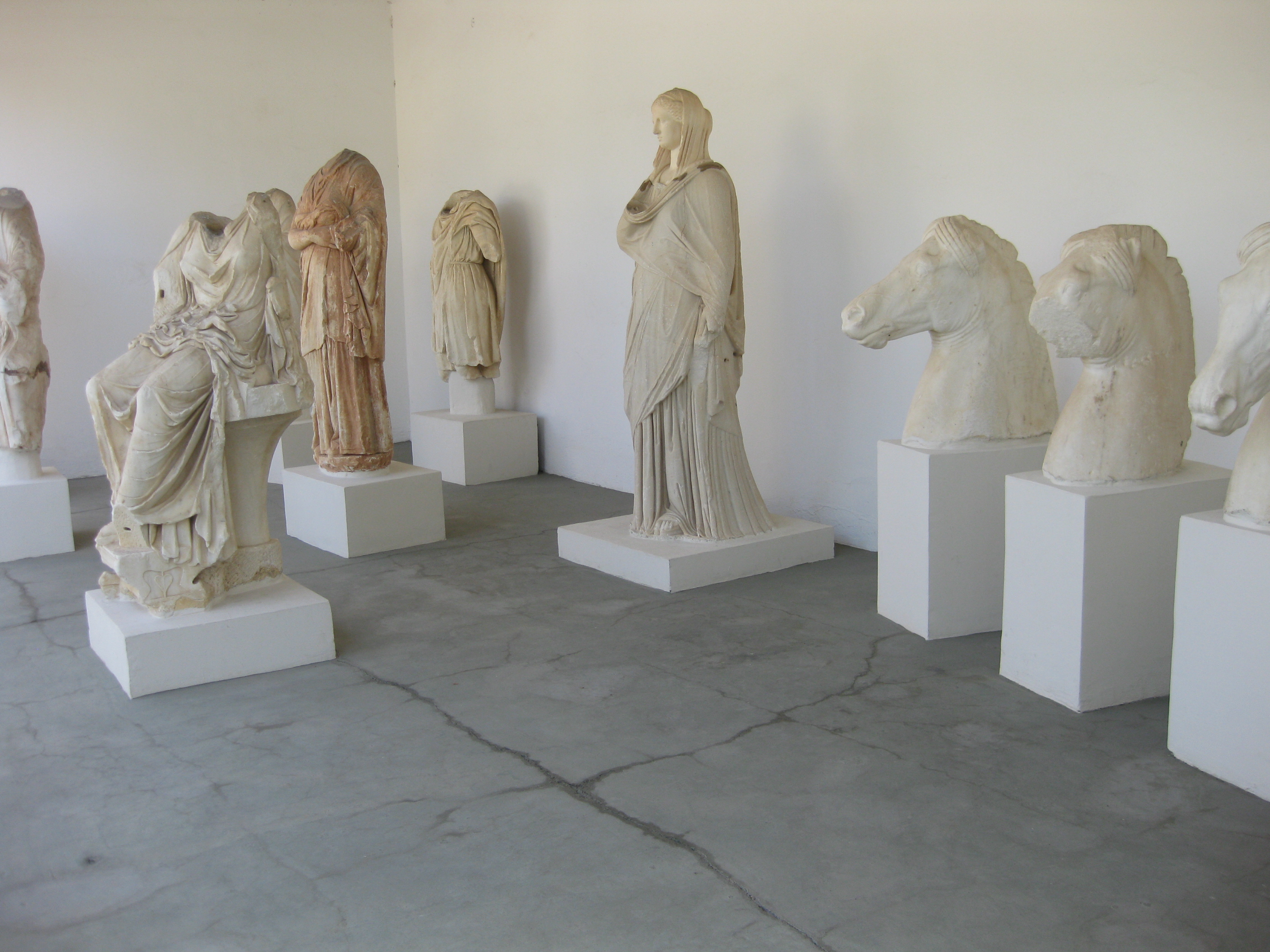
Exhibits in the archaeological museum of Chalcis.

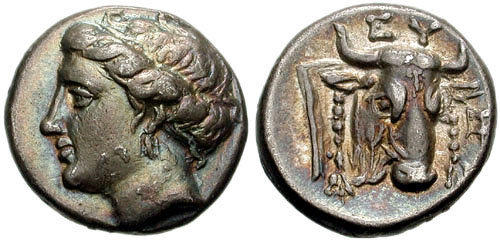
Silver drachma of the Euboean League. Obverse: Head of the nymph Euboea. Reverse: Bull's head, kantharos to right EY[ΒΟΙΕΩΝ] "of the Euboeans".

The archeological site of Lefkandi is an important site dating to the Greek Dark Ages that shows continuous activity on the island during this time period. The classical history of the island of Euboea is largely that of its two principal cities, Chalcis and Eretria, both mentioned in the Catalogue of Ships. Both cities were settled by Ionian Greeks from Attica, and would eventually settle numerous colonies in Magna Graecia and Sicily, such as Cumae and Rhegium, and on the coast of Macedonia. This opened new trade routes to the Greeks, and extended the reach of Western Civilization. The commercial influence of these city-states is evident in the fact that the Euboic scale of weights and measures was used among the Ionic cities generally, and in Athens until the end of the 7th century BC, during the time of Solon. The classicist Barry B. Powell has proposed that Euboea may have been where the Greek alphabet was first employed, c. 775–750 BC, and that Homer may have spent part of his life on the island.

Silver tetrobol from Euboia, Histaia. Wreathed head of the Nymph Histiaia right; [ΙΣΤΙ] – ΑΕΙΩΝ, Nymph Histiaia seated right on stern of galley, ornamented with wing, holding naval standard; AP monogram and labrys in exergue; BMC 61; BCD 391

Chalcis and Eretria were rival cities, and appear to have been equally powerful for a while. One of the earliest major military conflicts in Greek history took place between them, known as the Lelantine War, in which many other Greek city-states also took part. In 490 BC, Eretria was utterly ruined by the Persian armies. Eretria, Athens, and other Ionian Greek states had previously burned the Persian city of Sardis and participated in the Ionian revolution. After Eretria was destroyed, its inhabitants were transported as captives to Persia. Though it was restored nearby its original site after the Battle of Marathon, the city never regained its former eminence. Following the battles of Thermopylae and Artemisium in 480 BC, Persian forces occupied Euboea along with Attica and Boeotia. Following their decisive defeat at the Battle of Plataea the following year, the Persians withdrew from all of their European possessions, including Euboea.

Both cities gradually lost influence to Athens, which saw Euboea as a strategic territory. Euboea was an important source of grain and cattle, and controlling the island meant Athens could prevent invasion and better protect its trade routes from piracy. Athens invaded Chalcis in 506 BC and settled 4,000 Attic Greeks on their lands. After this conflict, the whole of the island was gradually reduced to an Athenian dependency. Another struggle between Euboea and Athens broke out in 446. Led by Pericles, the Athenians subdued the revolt, and captured Histiaea in the north of the island for their own settlement.

By 410 BC, during the Peloponnesian War, the island succeeded in regaining its independence. Euboea participated in Greek affairs until it fell under the control of Philip II of Macedon after the Battle of Chaeronea in 338 BC. It was incorporated into the Roman Republic in the second century BC. Aristotle died on the island in 322 BC soon after fleeing Athens for his mother's family estate in Chalcis. From the early Hellenistic period to well into the Roman Imperial period, the island was organized into the Euboean League.

=== Middle Ages ===
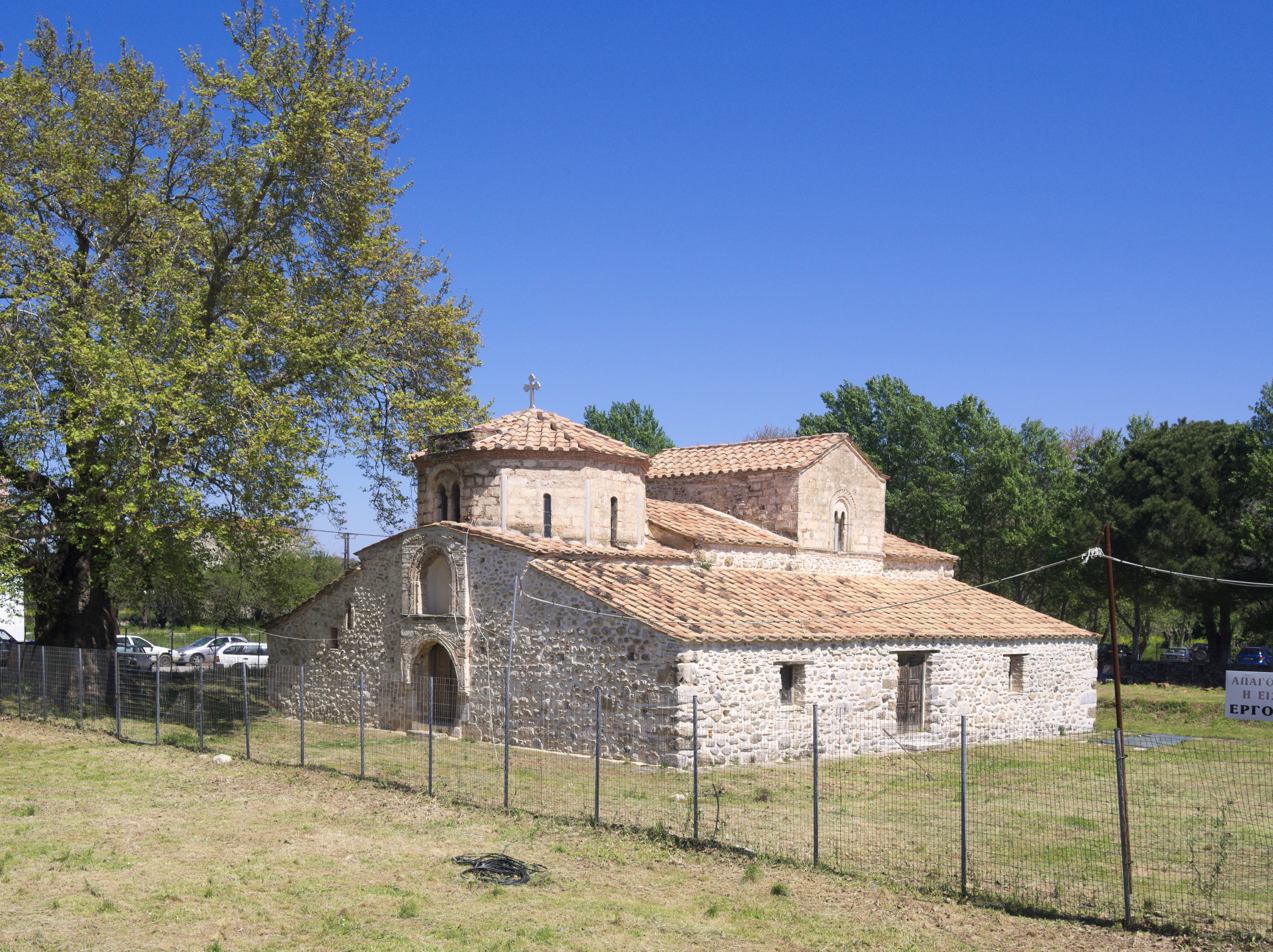
St Demetrius in Avlonari (10th)

Negroponte and the other Greek and Latin states of southern Greece, c. 1210.

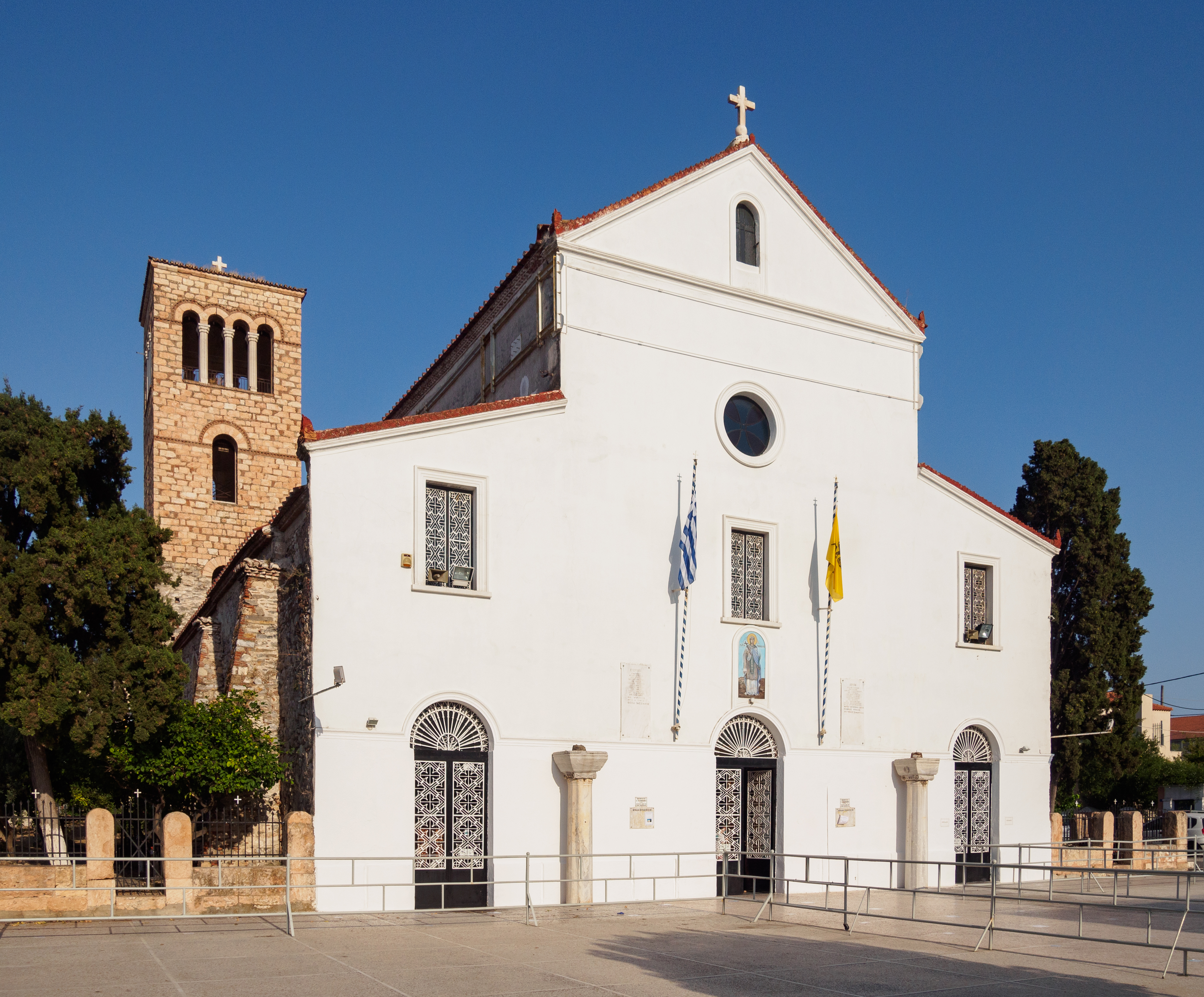
Medieval church of Agia Paraskevi, Chalcis.

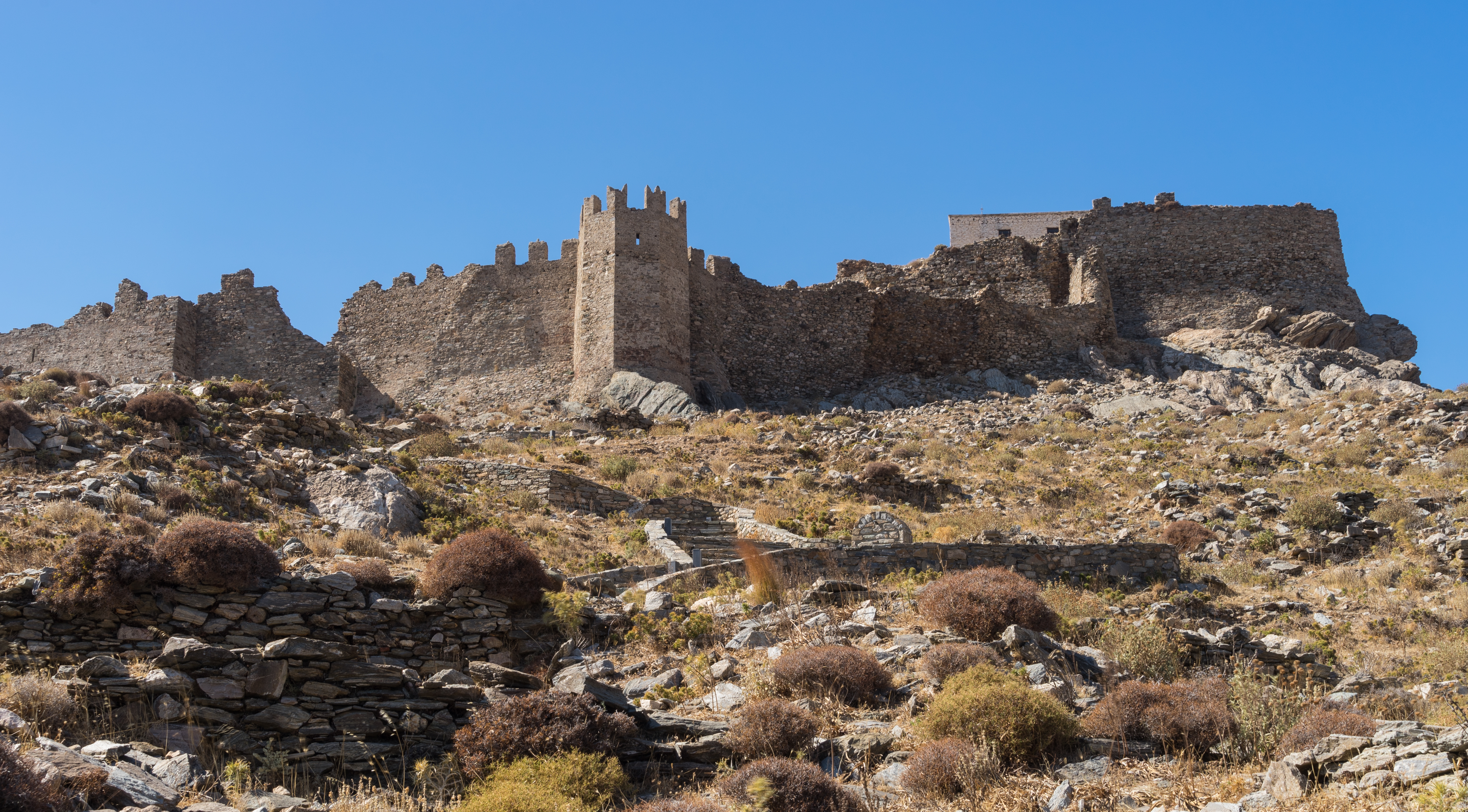
Kokkinokastro (Castelrosso) of Karystos

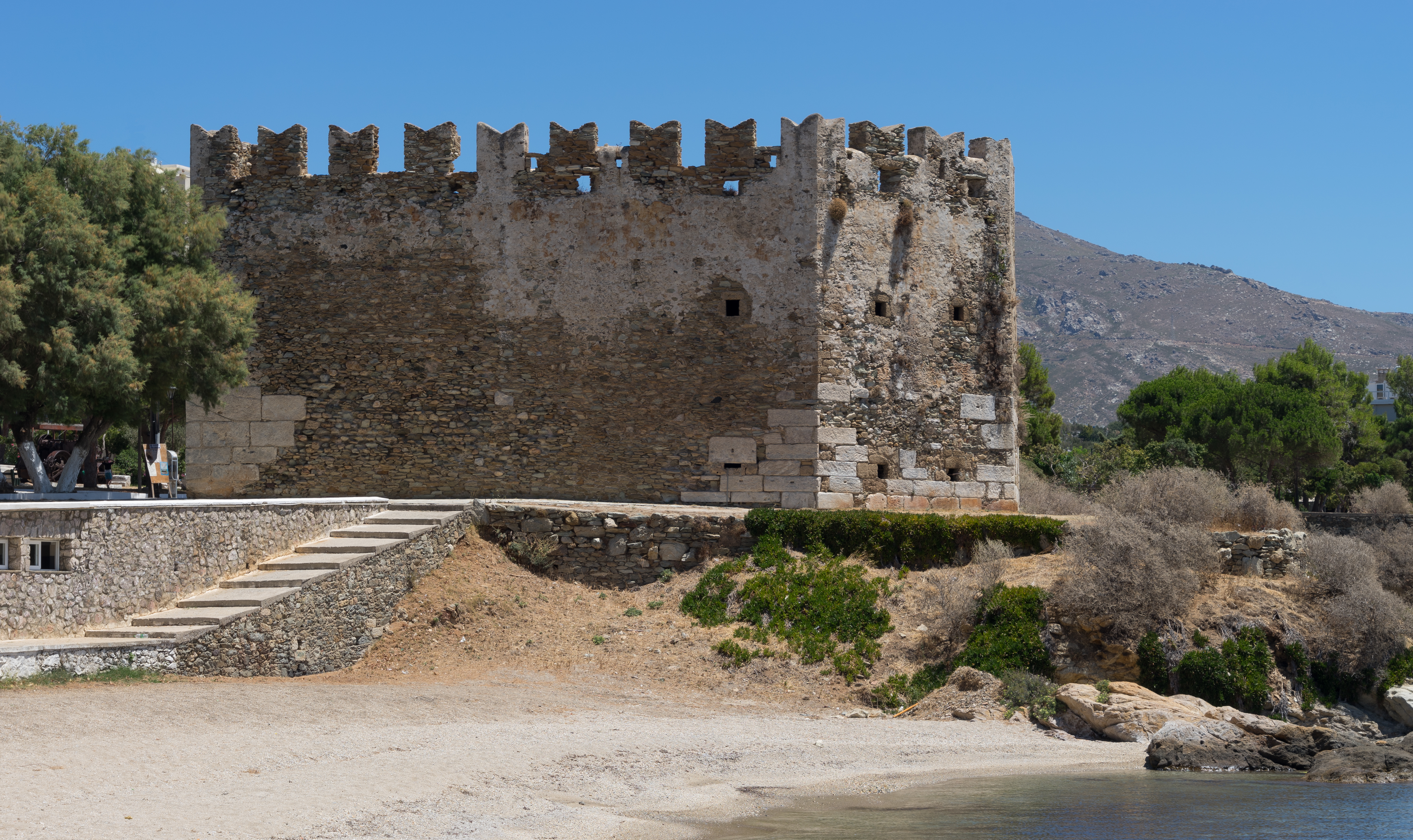
Bourtzi castle, Karystos

Unlike much of Byzantine Greece, Euboea was spared the bulk of the barbarian raids during late antiquity and the early medieval period, due to its relatively isolated location. The Vandals raided its shores in 466 and in 475, but the island seems to have been left alone by the Avars and Slavs, and it was not until a failed Arab attack on Chalcis in the 870s that the island again came under threat. As a result, the island preserved a relative prosperity throughout the early medieval period, as attested by finds of mosaics, churches and sculpture throughout the 7th century, "even from remote areas of the island". In the 6th century, the Synecdemus listed four cities on the island, Aidipsos, Chalcis, Porthmos (modern Aliveri) and Karystos, and a number of other sites are known as bishoprics in the subsequent centuries (Oreoi and Avlon), although their urban character is unclear. In the 8th century, Euboea formed a distinct fiscal district (dioikesis), and then formed part of the theme of Hellas.

In 1157 all the coastal towns of Euboea were destroyed by a Sicilian force, while Chalcis was burned down by the Venetians in 1171. During the 13th century, the Greek element of the island was strengthened by the Byzantine Emperor Michael Palaiologos.

Euboea came into prominence following the Fourth Crusade. In the partition of the Byzantine Empire by the crusaders after 1204, the island was occupied by a number of Lombard families, who divided it into three baronies, the Triarchy of Negroponte; each barony was split in 1216, giving six sestiere. The island's rulers came early on under the influence of the Venetian Republic, which secured control of the island's commerce in the War of the Euboeote Succession (1256–1258) and gradually expanded its control, until they acquired full sovereignty by 1390.

On 12 July 1470, during the Ottoman–Venetian War of 1463–1479 and after a protracted and bloody siege, the well-fortified city of Negroponte (Chalcis) was wrested from Venice by Mehmed II and the whole island fell into the hands of the Ottoman Empire. The Doge Francesco Morosini besieged the city in 1688, but was forced to withdraw after three months.

Albanians started settling Euboea gradually, since 1402, encouraged by the Venetians. In 1425, a total of 10,000 Albanians from various regions were settled in Euboea. A further indeterminate number of Albanians settled in the island in 1435. These Albanians intermingled with the local Greeks of the island. According to Johann Georg Von Hahn (1854), Albanians were present in all of the cities of southern Euboea, excluding the town of Karystos, which was inhabited solely by Greeks. According to Hahn, the Albanians numbered 25,000 in south Euboea, out of the total population of 72,368 of the island as a whole.

The Greek inhabitants of south Euboea spoke a certain dialect related to Old Athenian. This dialect was spoken in Kymi, Avlonari, Konistres, Aliveri, Karystos and other places.

Although the name Negroponte remained current in European languages until the 19th century, the Turks themselves called the city and the island Eğriboz or Ağriboz after the Euripos Strait. Under Ottoman rule, Ağriboz was the seat of a sanjak that also encompassed much of Continental Greece.

At the conclusion of the Greek War of Independence in 1830, the island returned to Greece and constituted a part of the newly established independent Greek kingdom.

=== Modern period ===
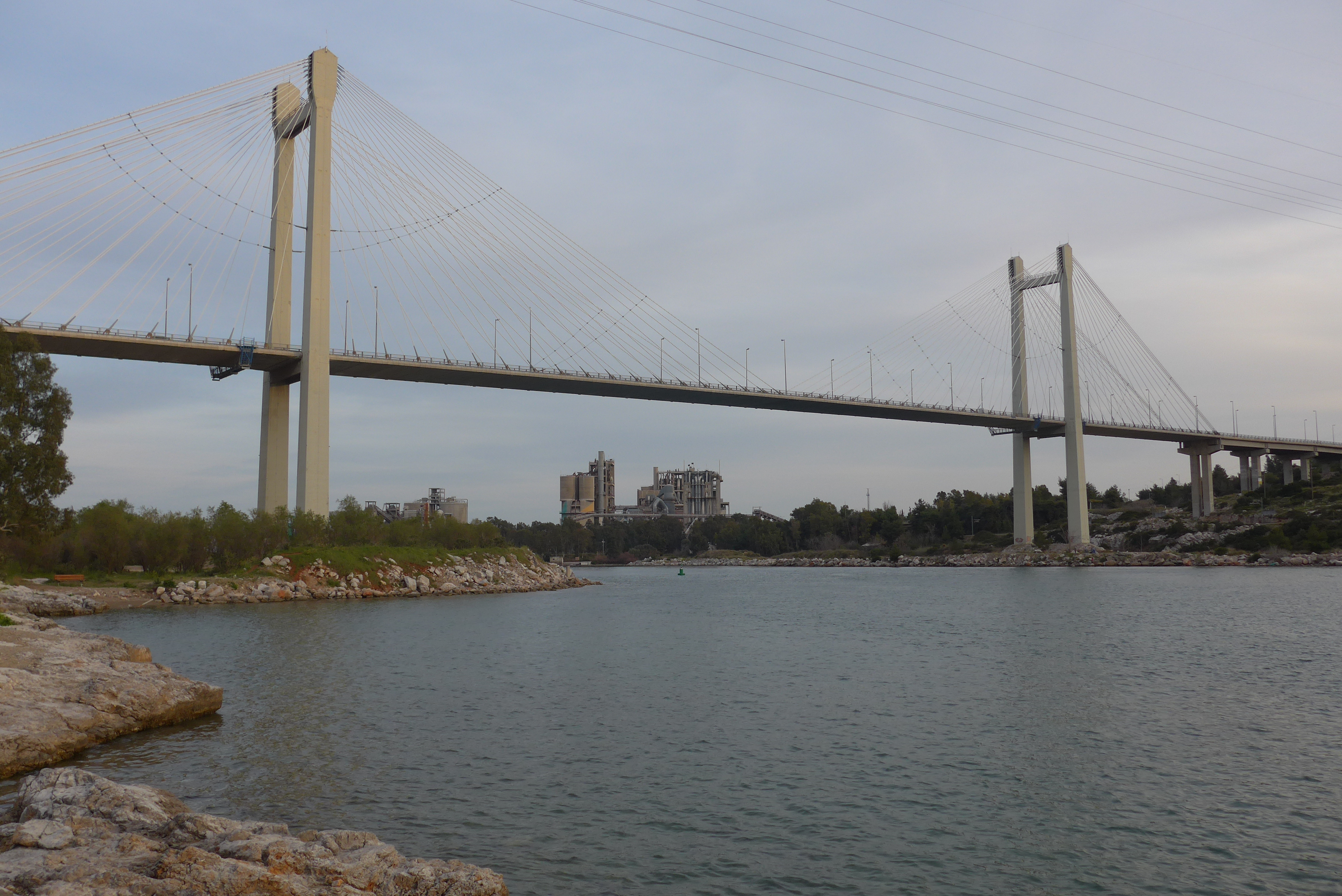
The Chalcis' Bridge connecting the island with the mainland of Greece.

In 1982, in the Greek-speaking village of Antia in southern Euboea, the entire population knew the local whistled language called sfyria (from the Greek word sfyrizo 'whistle'), but only a few whistlers remain in the 21st century. Sfyria is "a whistled version of spoken Greek, in which letters and syllables correspond to distinct tones and frequencies."

Beginning in late 1943, 1,000 Greek Jews were smuggled from Thessaloniki and Athens via the island by the Greek Resistance and British MI11 to Çeşme in neutral Turkey, thereby escaping the Holocaust in Greece.

In the 1980s, the Dystos lake was filled with grass which was set on fire by farmers to make more farmland. This act caused devastation of much of the plants and the environment in that area. A part of the lake later regenerated. Also the municipalities of Anthidona and Avlida in the mid to late 20th century, which once were part of Boeotia, reverted to Chalcis. Since then, the postal codes have corresponded with the rest of Euboea, including Skyros.

A week-long major forest fire in 2021 destroyed over 50,000 hectares of forest and agricultural land in the north of the island, one of the largest forest fires in modern Greek history.

== Mythology ==
The promontory of Cenaeum, which lies opposite the Malian Gulf, together with the neighbouring coast of Trachis, was the scene of the events connected with the death of Heracles, as described by Sophocles in the Trachiniae.

Based on the records of the 2nd century AD geographer Pausanias, it is suspected that the Titan god Crius is an indigenous deity.

== Demographics ==
The population of the island, according to the census of 2021, was 204,818, making it the second most populous island of Greece. As a whole the Euboeans share a cultural identity similar to that of the people in the rest of Central Greece and speak a southern variety of Greek. In the southern part of the island there are Arvanite communities. Until the 1970s there were still monolingual speakers of Arvanitika in southern Euboea. As of the late 20th century, in southern Euboea there were about 60 villages inhabited by Arvanites. Sarakatsani and Vlachs could be found mainly in the mountainous areas in central and northern Euboea respectively, but nowadays they have abandoned the nomadic way of life and live permanently in the towns and villages across the island.

== Economy ==
The mining areas include magnesite in Mantoudi and Limni, lignite in Aliveri and iron and nickel from Dirfys. Marble is mined 3 km (2 mi) north of Eretria which include Marmor Chalcidicum and asbestos in the northeastern part of Carystus in the Okhi mountain. The trees include chestnuts.

== Transport ==
Euboea is linked to the mainland by two bridges, an older sliding bridge that runs west from Chalcis towards Thebes, and a newer cable-stayed bridge which heads south from Chalcis towards Athens.

The Oinoi–Chalcis railway ends just outside the island, at Chalcis station. There are also three national roads in the island: the EO44; the EO77; and the Chalcis–Vathy–Chalcis National Road, which leads to the A11 motorway just outside the island.

== Local administration ==
The island belongs to Euboea Prefecture which also includes two municipalities on the mainland, Anthidona and Avlida, as well as the island municipality of Skyros. At the 2001 census the prefecture had a population of 215,136 inhabitants, whereas the island itself had a population of 198,130. The prefecture's land area is 4,167.449 km^{2} (1,609 sq mi), whereas the total land area of the municipalities actually on the island is 3,684.848 km^{2} (1,423 sq mi), which includes numerous small offshore islets (Petalioi) near Euboea's southeastern tip.

== Notable people ==
- Sotiria Bellou (1921–1997), singer
- Mordechai Frizis (1893–1940), Romaniote general who helped defeat fascist Italy's Julia Division in southern Albania during the Greco-Italian War
- Konstantinos Kallias (9 July 1901 – 7 April 2004), politician
- Nikolaos Kriezotis (1785–1853), leader of the Greek Revolution on Euboea
- Demetrios Magiros (1912–1982), mathematician
- Orestis Makris (1898–1975), actor and tenor
- Georgios Papanikolaou (1883–1962), physician, pioneer in cytology and early cancer detection, creator of the Pap test
- Nikos Skalkottas (1901–1949), composer
- Giannis Skarimpas (1893–1984), writer
- Porphyrios (1906–1991), saint of the Orthodox Church
- George Marcus, (1941–present), Greek-American real estate pioneer

== Sporting teams ==
- Football: Chalkida F.C., Chalkida, third division
- Basketball: Chalkida BC, Chalkida, Greek A2 League, Kymis BC, Kymi

== Gallery ==
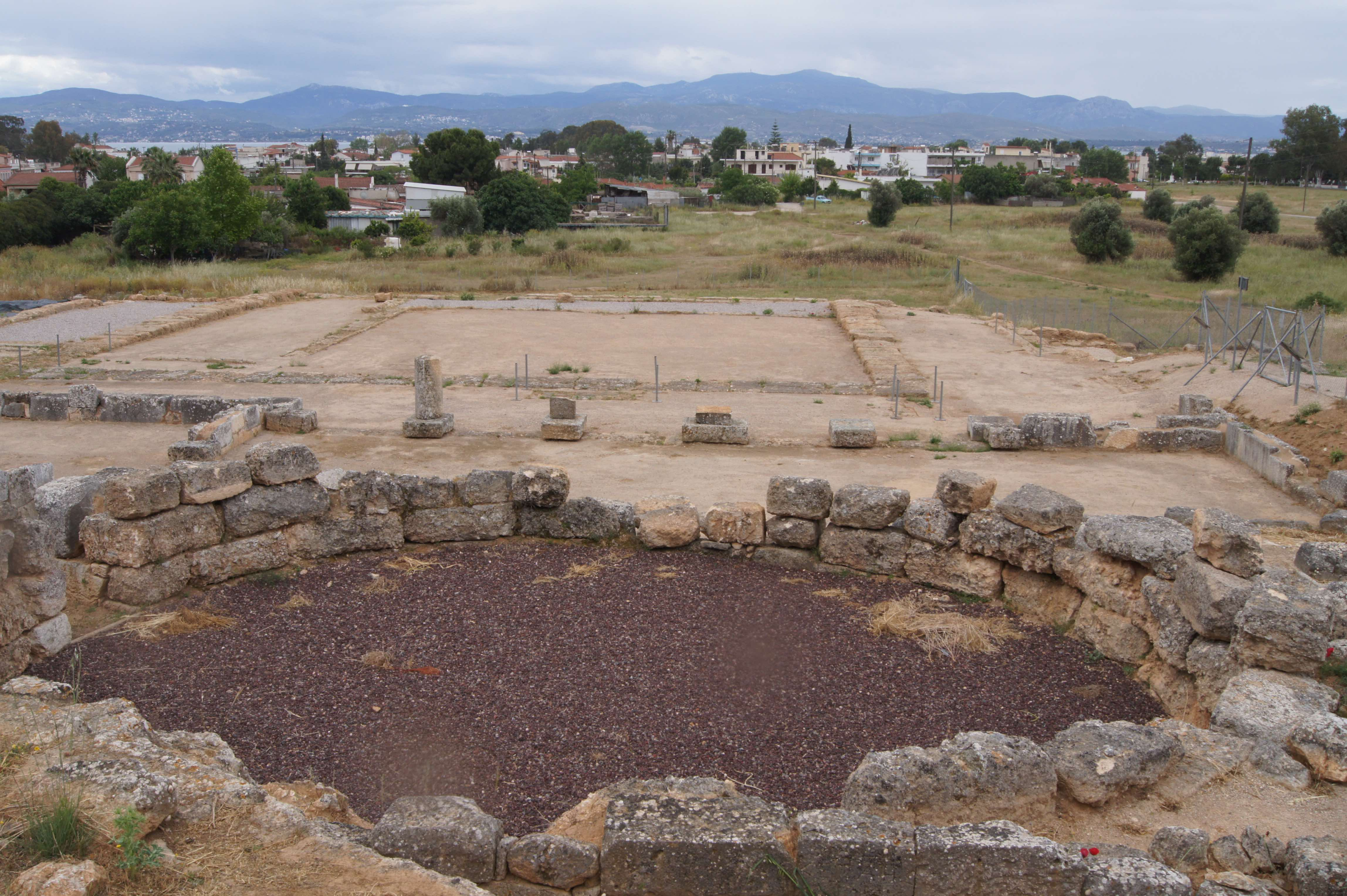
The upper gymnasion of ancient Eretria

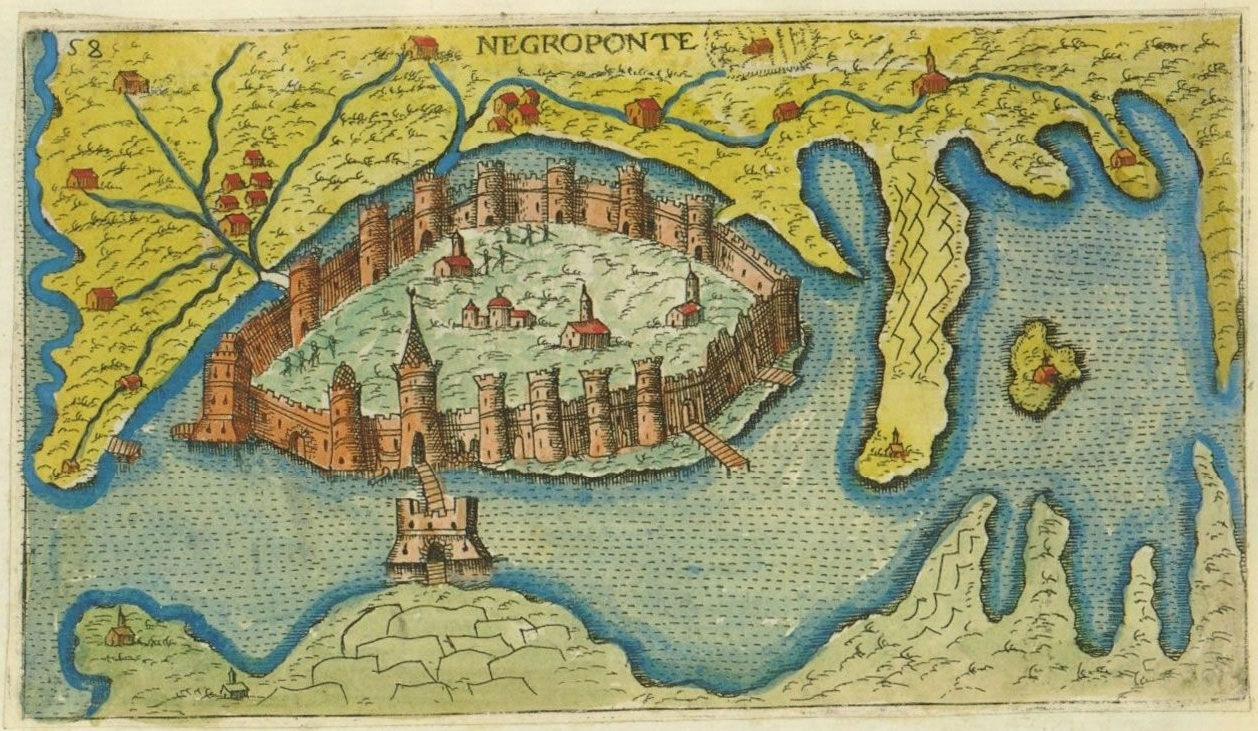
Depiction of Negroponte (Chalcis) by Giacomo Franco (1597)

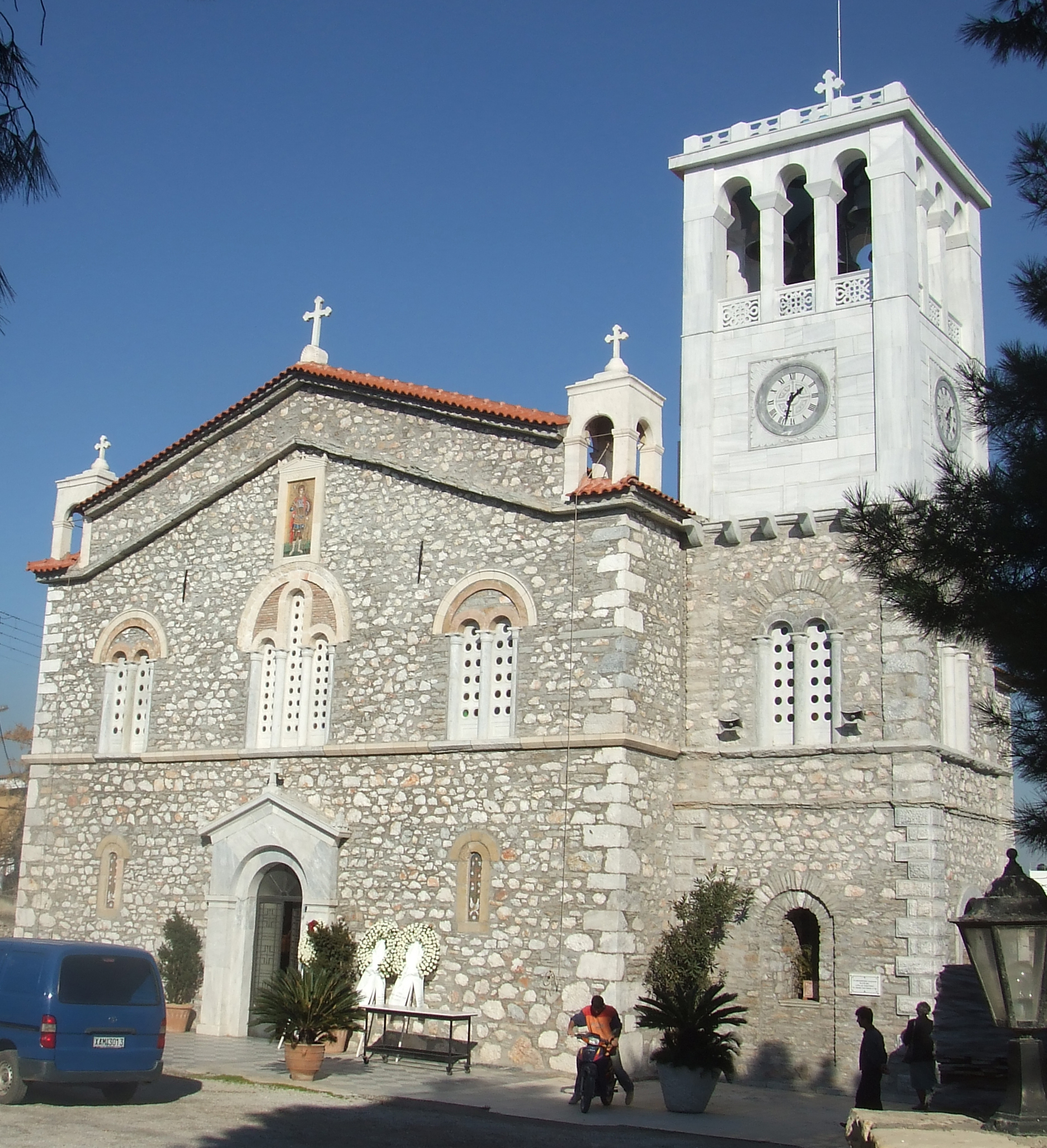
Church in Aliveri

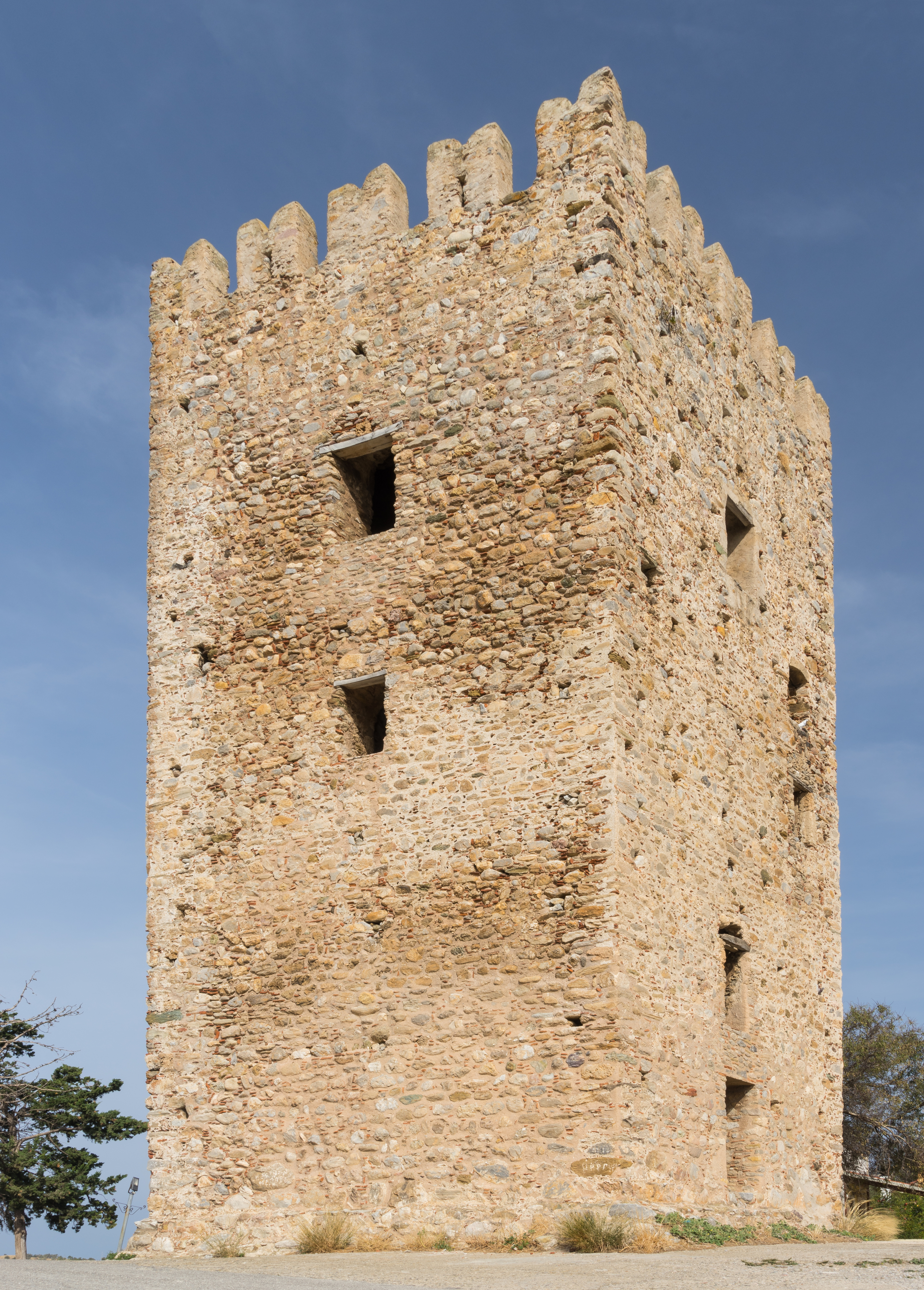
Venetian tower in Avlonari

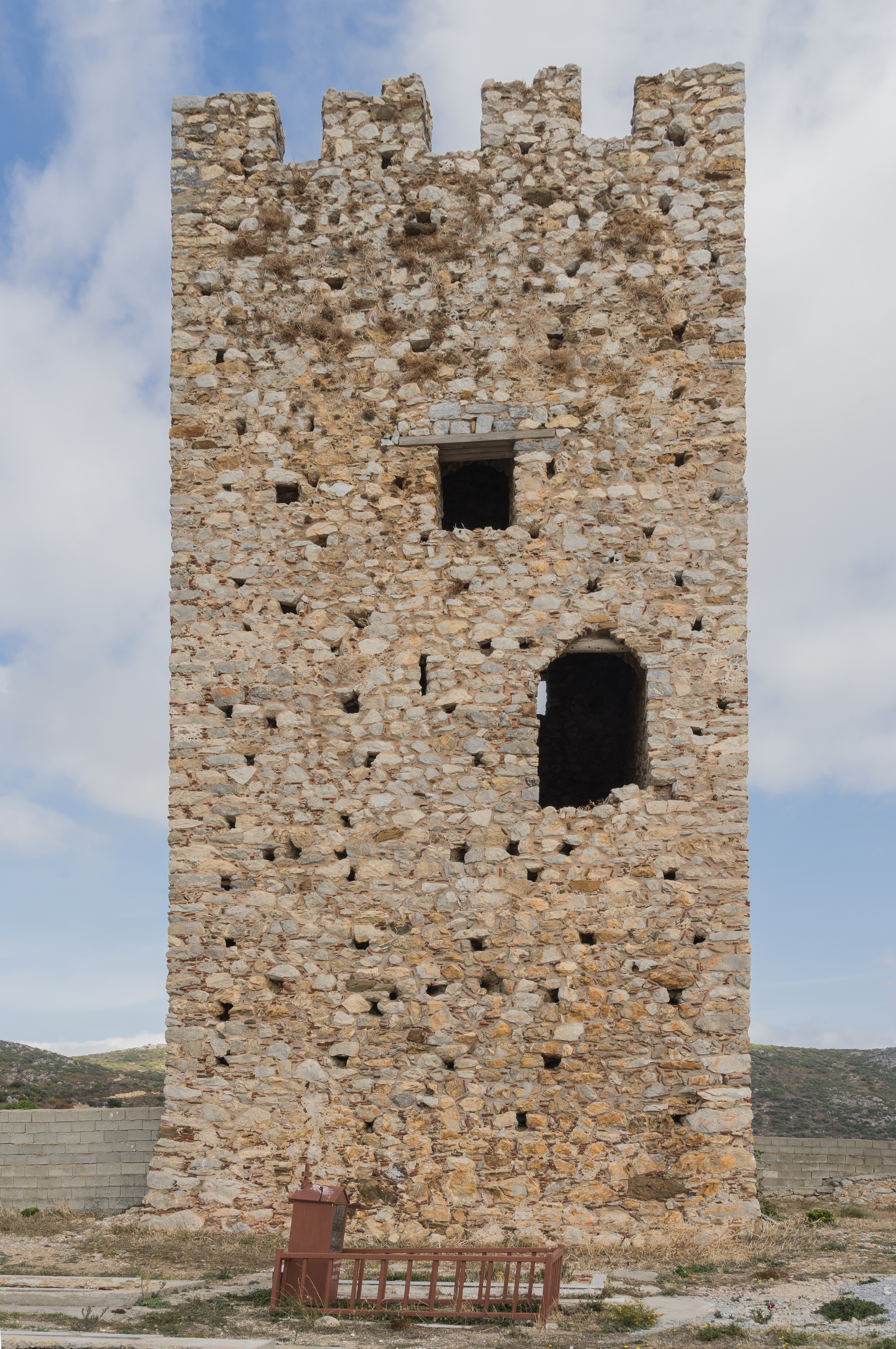
Venetian tower of Trachili

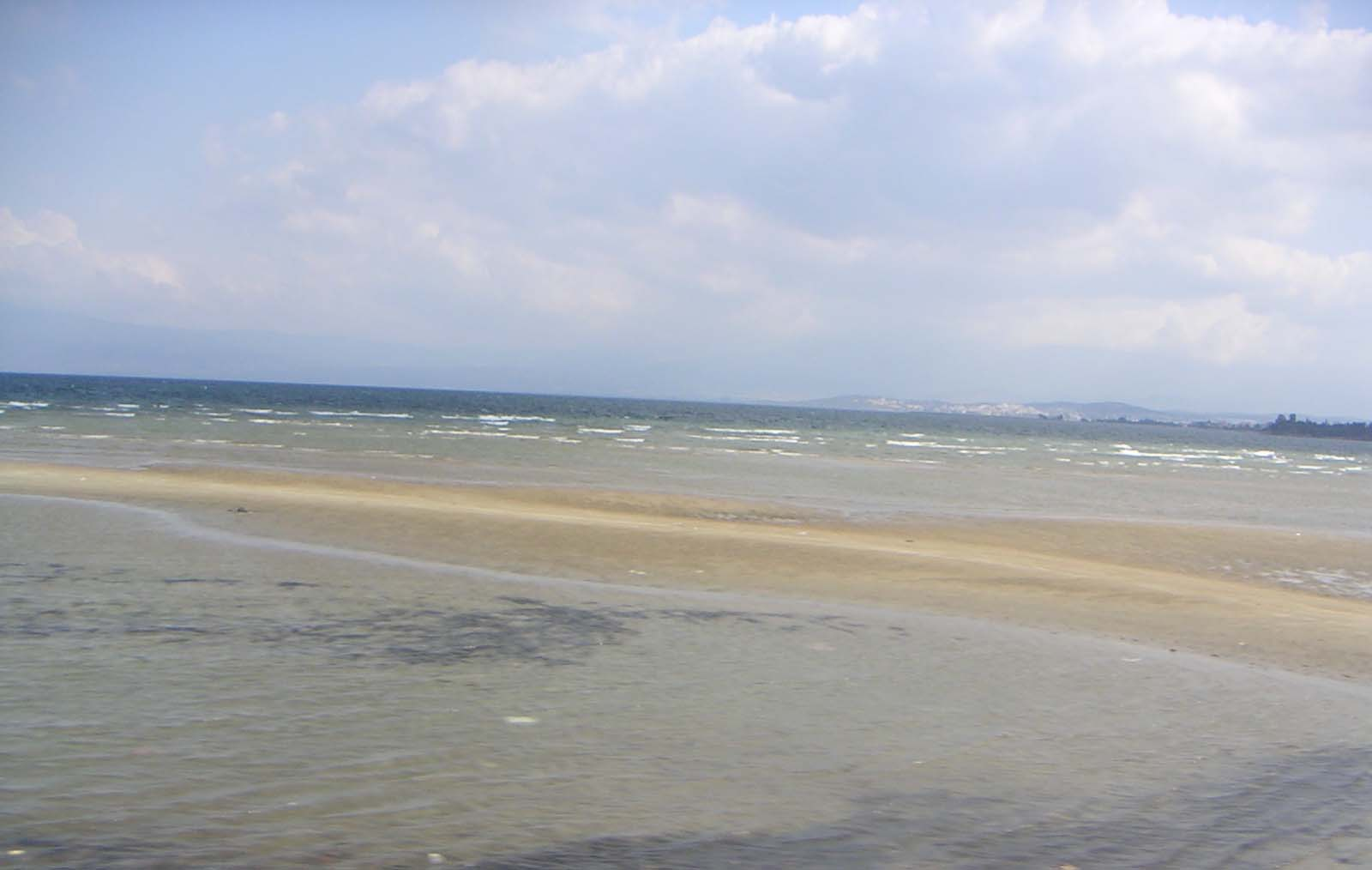
Beach of Chalcis

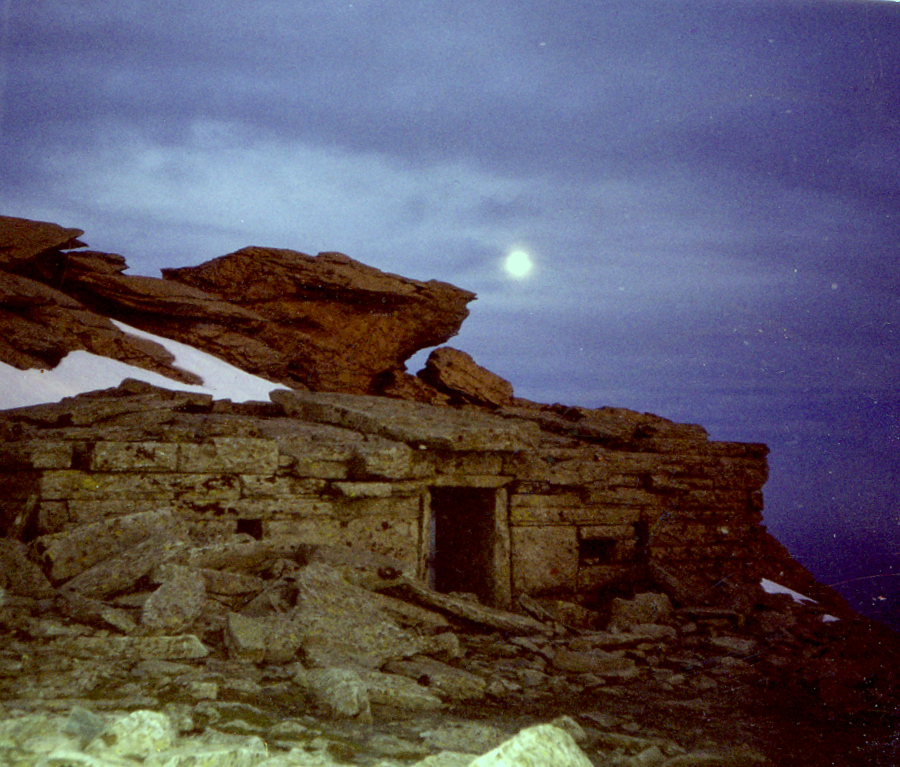
The Dragon house on Mount Ochi

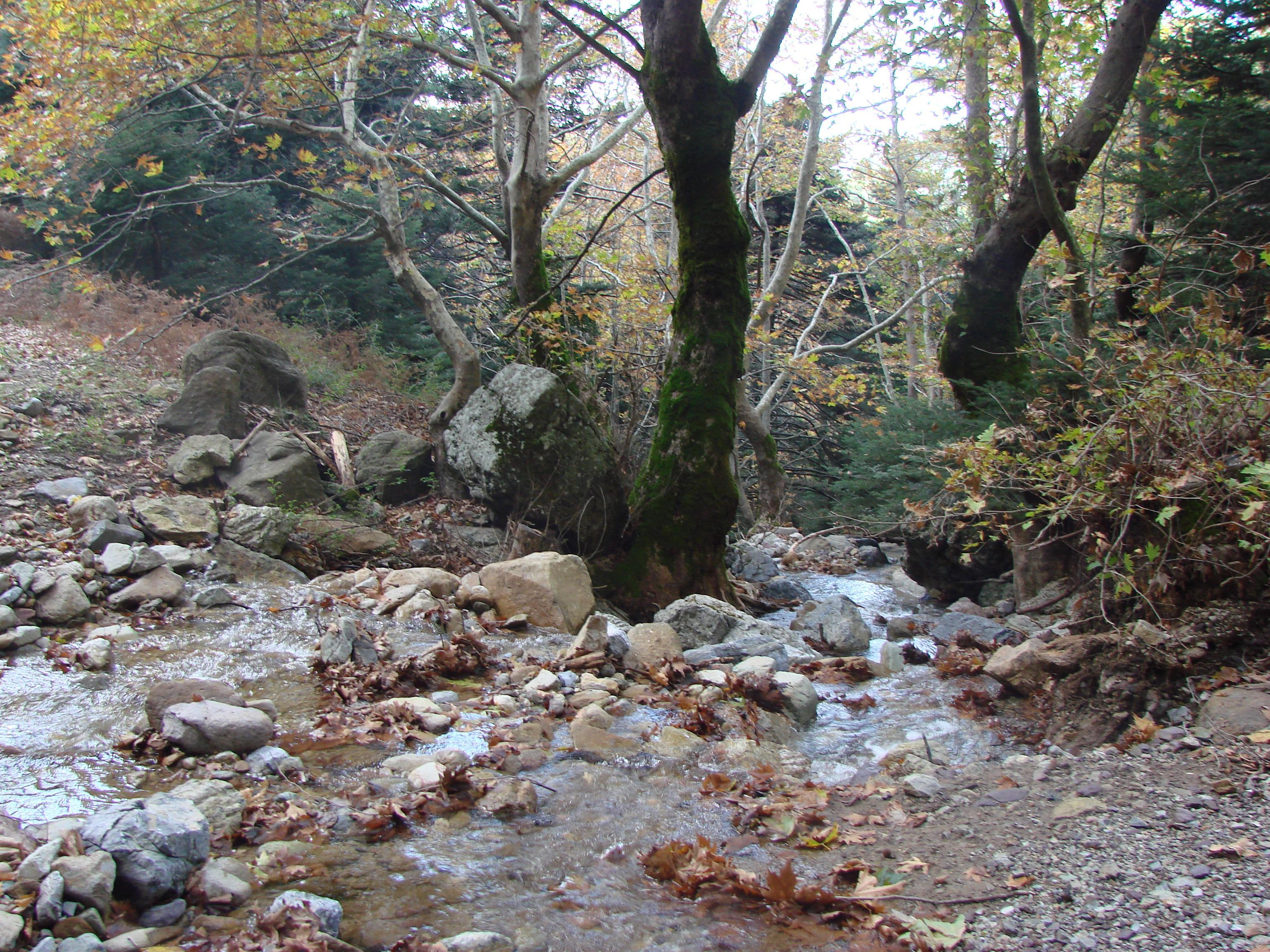
A tiny river flowing by the Dirfi mountain

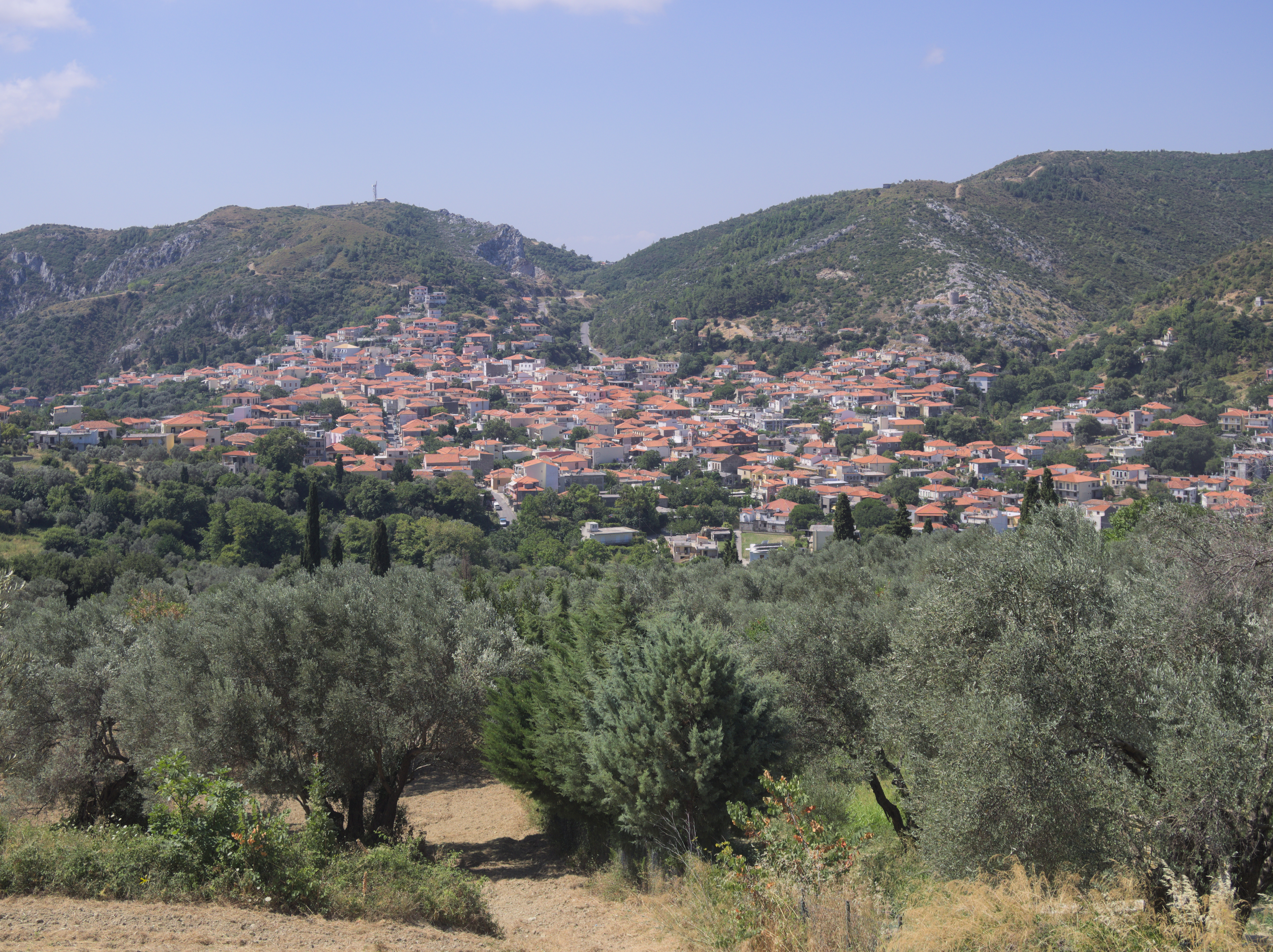
Kymi

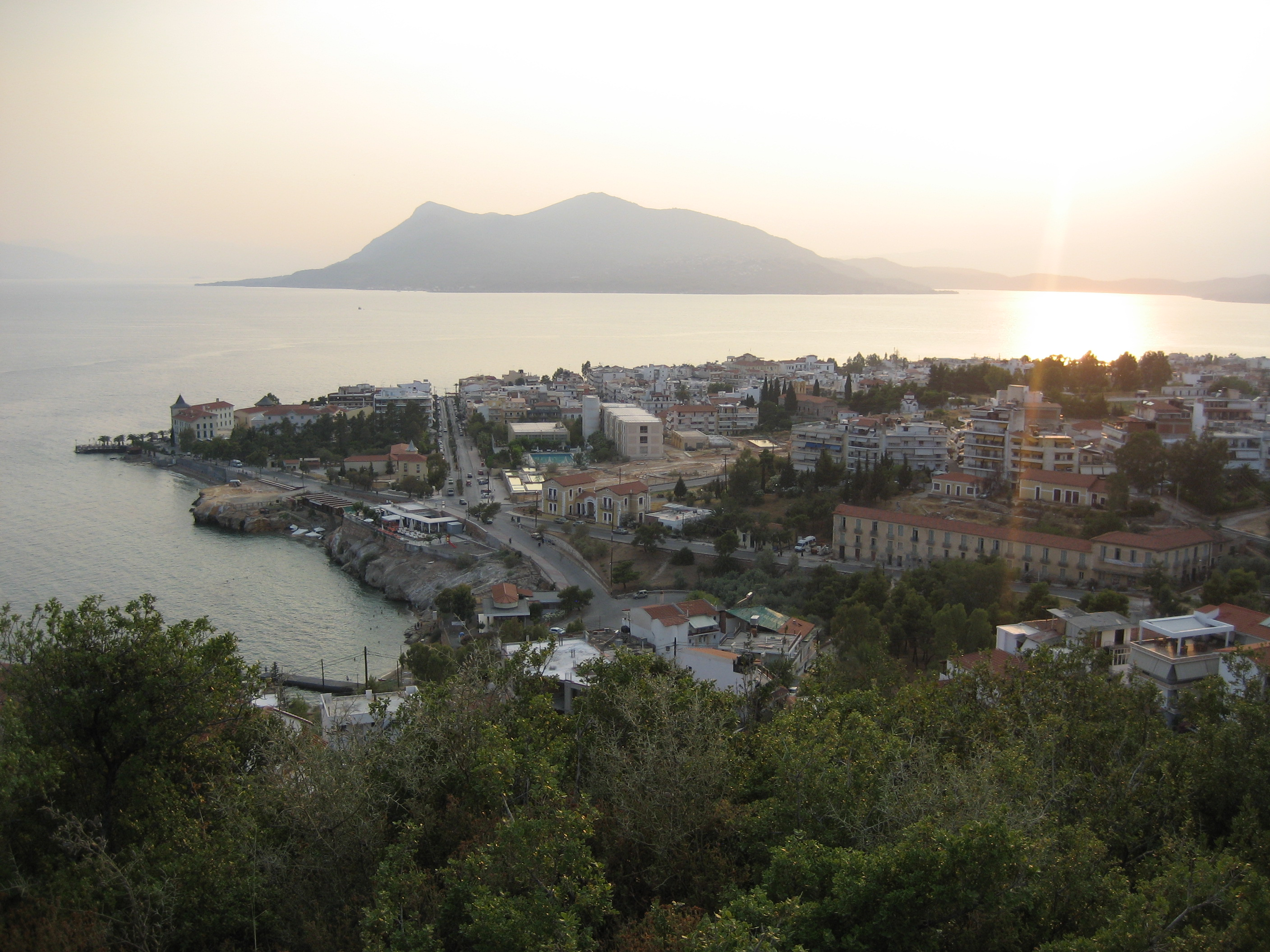
View of Aidipsos

== See also ==
- List of settlements in the Euboea regional unit
- List of Greek place names
- 1119 Euboea – Background asteroid
