= Kantili =

Mountain range in Greece

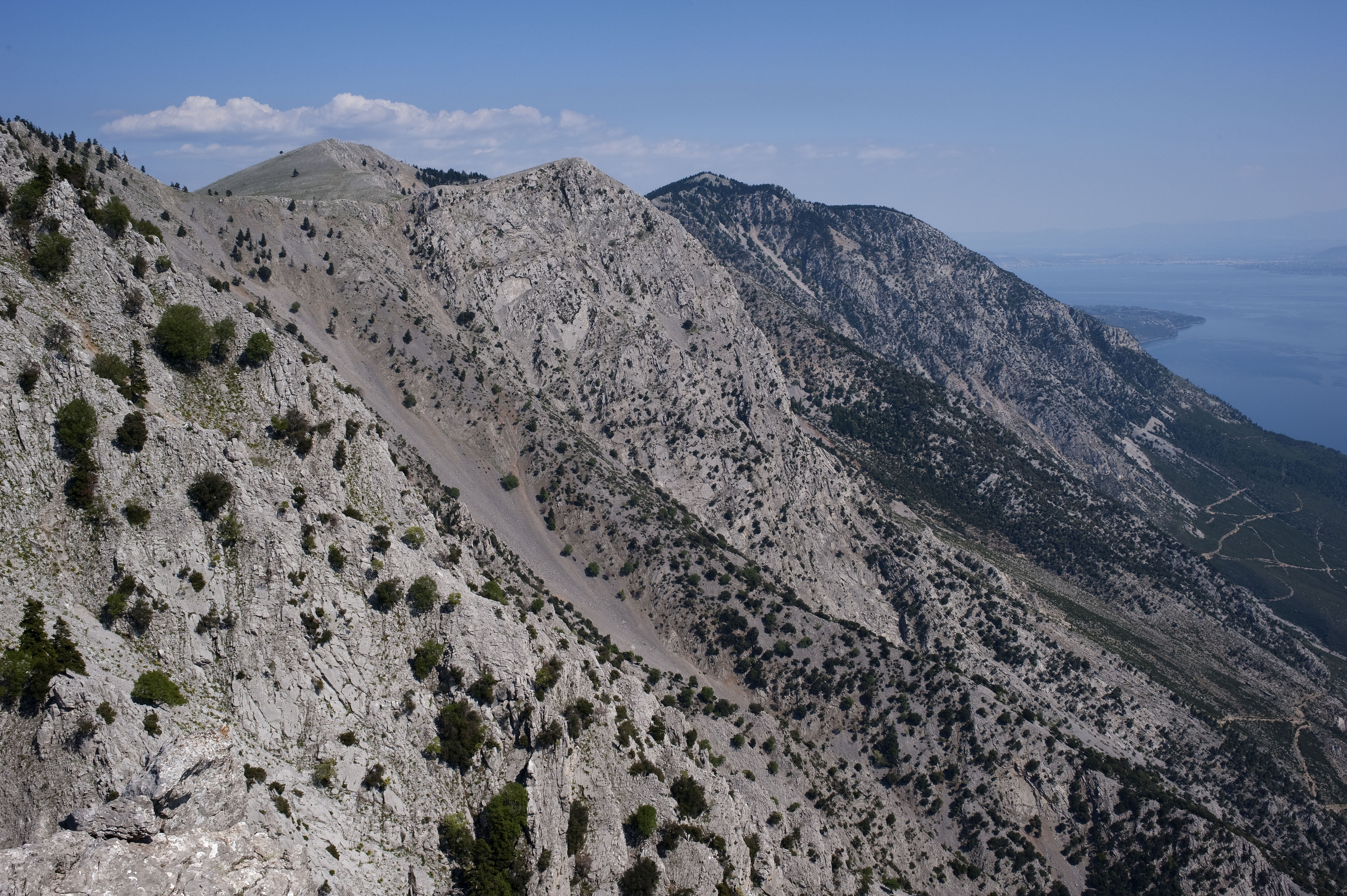

Highest point
- Elevation: 1,246 m (4,088 ft)
- Coordinates: 38.699°N 23.435°E

Naming
- Pronunciation: Greek: [kaˈdili]

Geography
- Location: Northwest Euboea, Greece

Kantili (Greek: Καντήλι) is a mountain range in the northwestern part of the island of Euboea in Greece. Its maximum elevation is 1,246 m. It stretches along the west coast of the island, above the shore of the North Euboean Gulf, between Limni and Politika. Its length is about 25 km from southeast to northwest. The slope towards the sea is very steep, and there is no road along the coast. The Greek National Road 77 (Chalcis - Istiaia) passes east of the mountains.

== See also ==
- List of mountains in Greece
