= Artemis =

Ancient Greek goddess

- Goddess of hunting, the wilderness, wild animals, transitions, nature, vegetation, childbirth, care of children, chastity, and archery
- Member of the Twelve Olympians
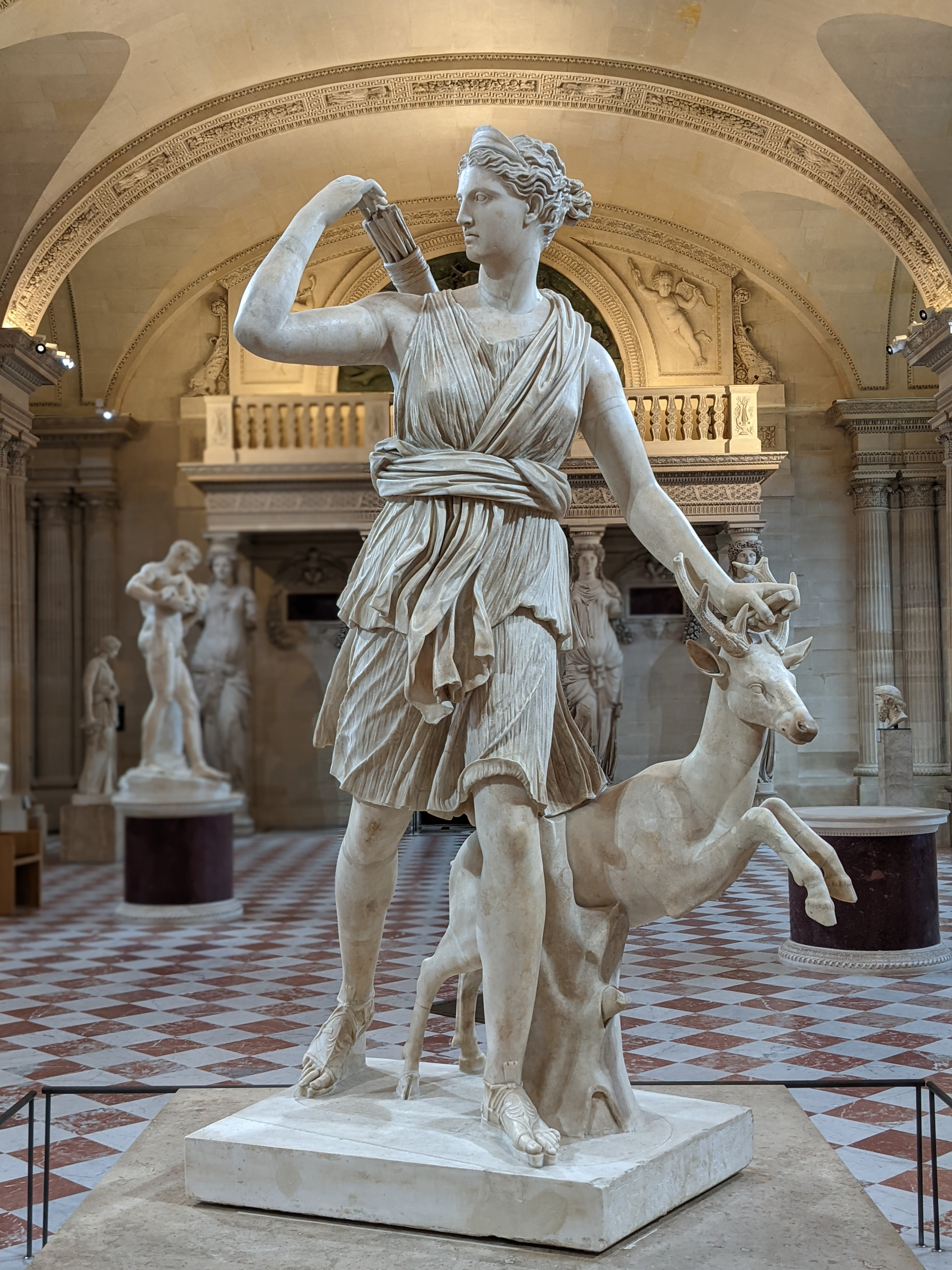
- The Diana of Versailles, a Roman copy of a Greek sculpture by Leochares (Louvre Museum)
- Abode: Mount Olympus
- Animals: Deer, bear, wild boar, other beasts
- Symbol: Bow and arrows, torch, chiton

Genealogy
- Parents: Zeus and Leto
- Siblings: Apollo (twin)

Equivalents
- Roman: Diana

In ancient Greek religion and mythology, Artemis (/ˈɑːrtəməs/; Ancient Greek: Ἄρτεμις) is the goddess of hunting, the wilderness, wild animals, transitions, nature, vegetation, childbirth, care of children, and chastity. She was often said to roam the forests and mountains, attended by an entourage of nymphs. The goddess Diana is her Roman equivalent.

Artemis was the daughter of Leto and Zeus, and twin sister of Apollo. In most accounts, Hera prevents the land from sheltering Leto for the twins' birth, condemning her to days of labor pains for a liaison with Zeus. Only the island of Delos allows her to give birth to her children. In one account, Artemis is born first and then proceeds to assist Leto in the birth of the second twin, Apollo.

Artemis was one of many kourotrophic (child-nurturing) deities and protected children, especially girls, and animal cubs. She was worshipped and feared as one of the primary goddesses of childbirth and midwifery along with Eileithyia and Hera. She was also a patron of healing and disease, believed to grant health or send illness and death to women and children, and a guardian over transitions from boy- and maidenhood, as well as other rites of passage. Artemis was thought of as an unmarried maiden and one of the three major virgin goddesses, alongside Athena and Hestia, over whom Aphrodite had no power.

In myth and literature, Artemis is presented as a hunting goddess, who roams the wilderness, often surrounded by a retinue of nymphs. The hunter Actaeon was said to have seen her bathing naked, whereupon the goddess transformed him into a deer, to let his own dogs devour him. In another myth, Callisto is driven away from Artemis' company after breaking her vow of virginity, turned into a bear and then into Ursa Major.

In the Epic tradition, Artemis halted the winds blowing the Greek ships during the Trojan War, stranding the fleet in Aulis, after King Agamemnon, the leader of the expedition, shot and killed her sacred deer. Artemis demanded the sacrifice of Iphigenia, his daughter, as compensation. In most versions, Artemis pities her and takes her away, leaving a deer in her place. In the war that followed, Artemis supported the Trojans against the Greeks, and she challenged Hera in battle.

Artemis was one of the most widely venerated Greek deities. Her great temple at Ephesus was one of the Seven Wonders of the Ancient World, before it was burnt to the ground. Artemis's symbols included a bow, arrow, and quiver, and the deer was sacred to her. In later times, she was identified with Selene, the personification of the Moon.

== Etymology ==
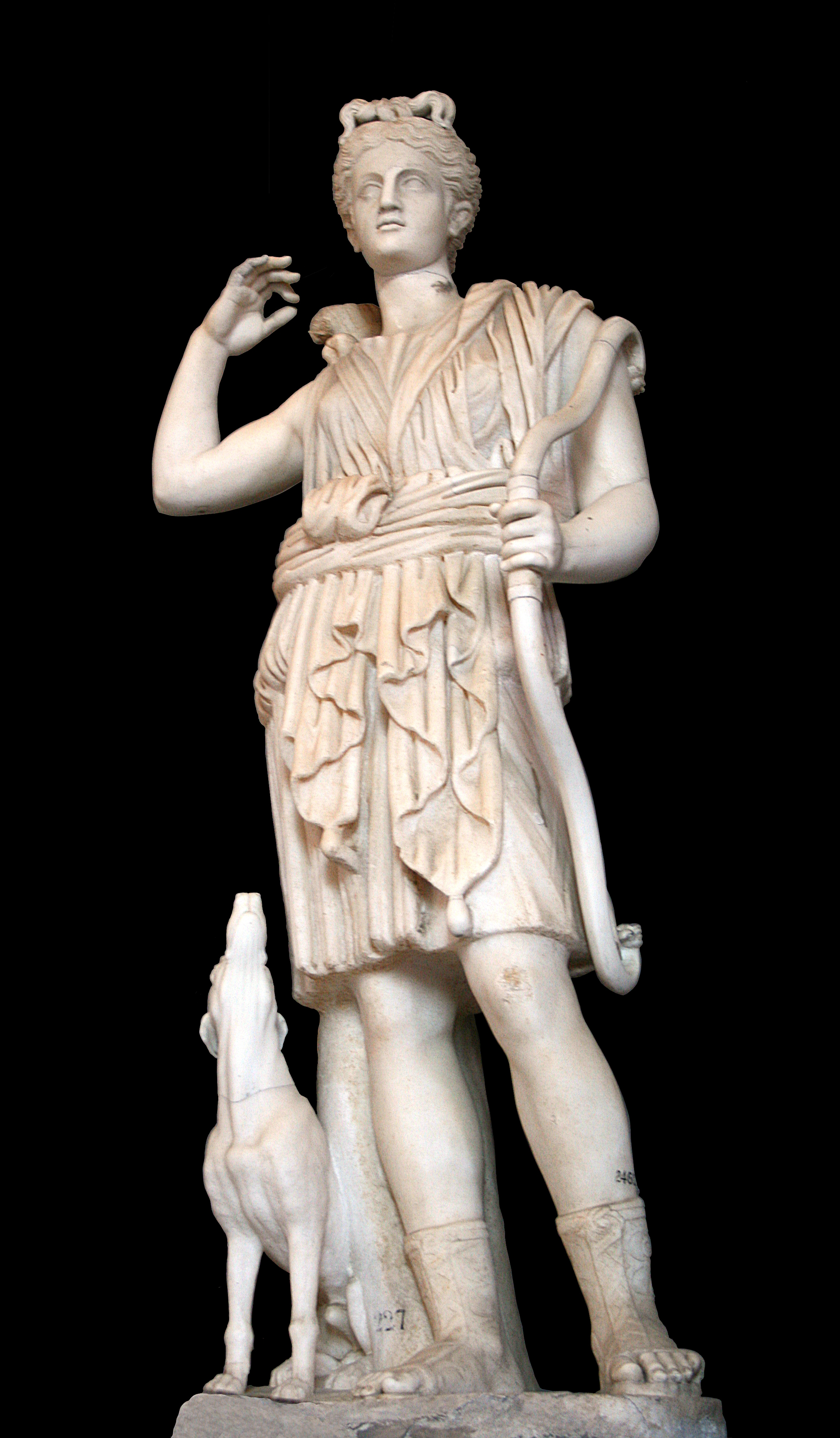
Artémis (Diane), the huntress. Roman copy of a Greek statue, 2nd century. Galleria dei Candelabri – Vatican Museums

The etymology of the name "Artemis" (n., f.) remains uncertain, though various origins have been proposed. Robert S. P. Beekes suggested the e/i interchange indicates a Pre-Greek origin, a view supported by the Lydian variant Artimus and by Georgios Babiniotis, who notes the name's Mycenaean attestation and possible pre-Greek roots.

The name may be related to Greek árktos "bear" (from PIE *h₂ŕ̥tḱos), supported by the bear cult the goddess had in Attica (Brauronia) and the Neolithic remains at the Arkoudiotissa Cave, as well as the story of Callisto, which was originally about Artemis (Arcadian epithet kallisto); this cult was a survival of very old totemic and shamanistic rituals and formed part of a larger bear cult found further afield in other Indo-European cultures (e.g., Gaulish Artio). It is believed that a precursor of Artemis was worshipped in Minoan Crete as the goddess of mountains and hunting, Britomartis. While connection with Anatolian names has been suggested, the earliest attested forms of the name Artemis are the Mycenaean Greek 𐀀𐀳𐀖𐀵, a-te-mi-to /Artemitos/ (gen.) and 𐀀𐀴𐀖𐀳, a-ti-mi-te /Artimitei/ (dat.), written in Linear B at Pylos.

According to J. T. Jablonski, the name is also Phrygian and could be "compared with the royal appellation Artemas of Xenophon". Charles Anthon argued that the primitive root of the name is probably of Persian origin from *arta, *art, *arte, all meaning "great, excellent, holy", thus Artemis "becomes identical with the great mother of Nature, even as she was worshiped at Ephesus". Anton Goebel "suggests the root στρατ or ῥατ, 'to shake', and makes Artemis mean the thrower of the dart or the shooter".

Ancient Greek writers, by way of folk etymology, and some modern scholars, have linked Artemis (Doric Artamis) to ἄρταμος, artamos, i.e. "butcher" or, like Plato did in Cratylus, to ἀρτεμής, artemḗs, i.e. "safe", "unharmed", "uninjured", "pure", "the stainless maiden". A. J. van Windekens tried to explain both ἀρτεμής and Artemis from ἀτρεμής, atremḗs, meaning "unmoved, calm; stable, firm" via metathesis.

== Description ==
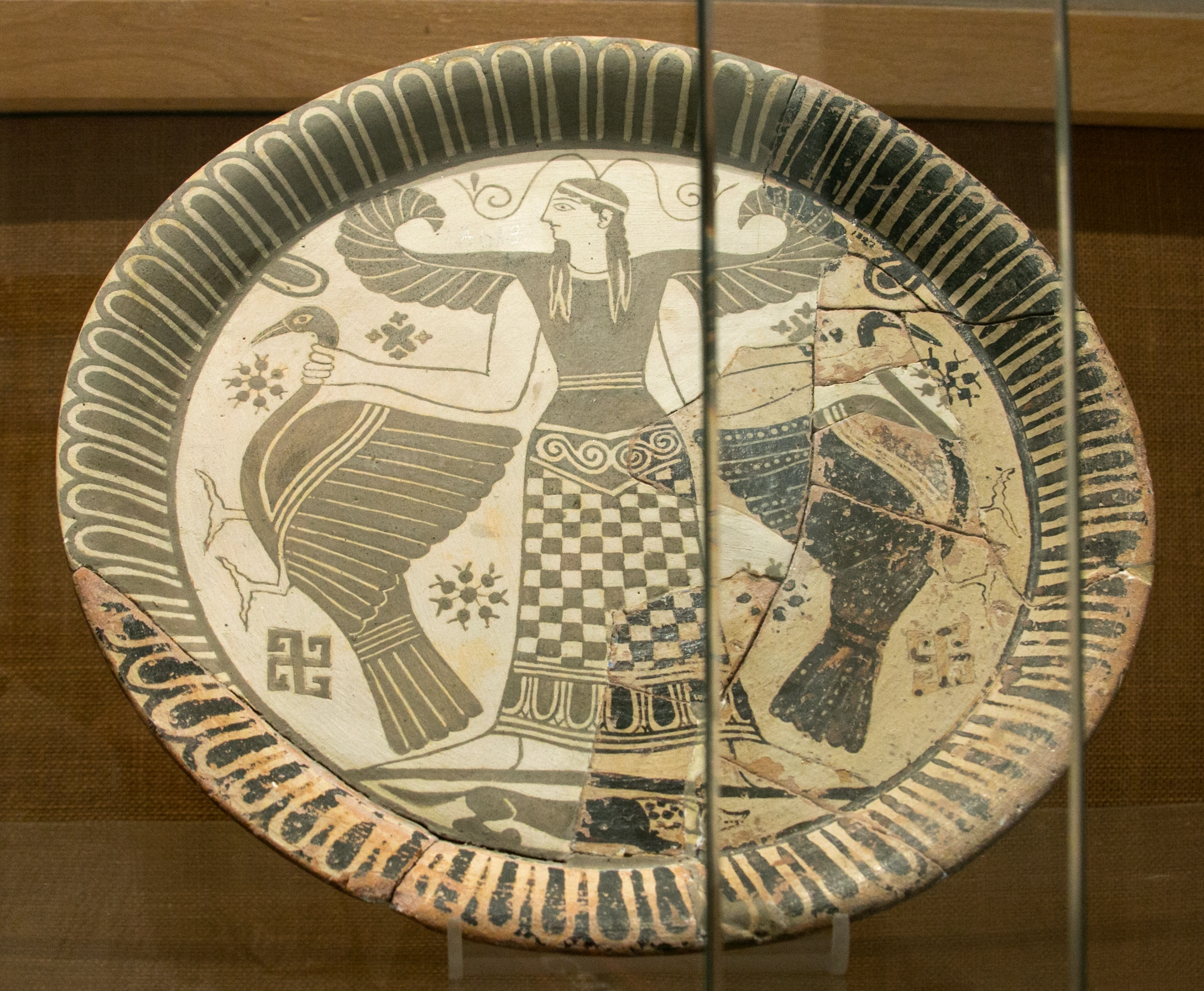
Artemis as Mistress of Animals, Parian pottery, 675–600 BCE. Hypothetical restoration (only some parts have been preserved). Archaeological Museum of Mykonos.

Artemis is an extremely manifold deity worshipped under many names and one of the oldest and most popular Olympian deities. Her many local depictions started fading into the image of the huntress in the classical age.

=== The Huntress ===
Classically, Artemis is portrayed as a maiden huntress, young, clothed in a short skirt, with hunting boots, a quiver, a golden or silver bow and arrows. The Homeric Hymn 27 to Artemis paints this picture of the goddess:

I sing of Artemis, whose shafts are of gold, who cheers on the hounds, the pure maiden, shooter of stags, who delights in archery, own sister to Apollo with the golden sword. Over the shadowy hills and windy peaks she draws her golden bow, rejoicing in the chase, and sends out grievous shafts. The tops of the high mountains tremble and the tangled wood echoes awesomely with the outcry of beasts: earthquakes and the sea also where fishes shoal.

— Homeric Hymn 27 to Artemis p. 1–9

In myths and tragedy, Artemis is depicted as a cruel, vengeful goddess. She's a slayer of women, paralleling her brother Apollo's disease-bringing arrows, and demands human sacrifices in the Iliad. She punishes loss of virginity, insults and neglect of sacrifices by death or sending wild beasts, but is appeased in some myths. In other homeric hymns and as Apollo's sister, her musical aspect is stressed, as a dancer, singer and lyre-player. In Sparta, she was revered as a warrior, in dances, processions of singing girls, ritual flagellation of boys, and competitions for cheese.

Her temple at Ephesus was considered one of the seven Wonders of the World, and her local cult was popular until late antiquity. From the 8th-4th century BCE, images of her included the mistress of animals and a woman with a child. Her later "many-breasted" image and Anatolian context led to identification with a mother goddess by late antique and modern scholars. However, the balls hanging from her statue are interpreted as dates or other decorations as well, and Artemis is more commonly associated with (transition from) childhood than with motherhood.

=== Entourage of Nymphs and Maidens ===
Artemis is depicted as the leader of or surrounded by nymphs and she dances or hunts in epics, most prominently in the Odyssey, where Odysseus compares Nausicaa to her, and in hellenistic and roman art. In earlier cult and literature, the association with nymphs is rare. However, she may have origins as an "übernymph", in addition to roots in Asia minor. Ancient poets note Artemis's imposing stature, as she stands taller than all the nymphs accompanying her.

In accordance with her maidenhood, references to Artemis' beauty are rare. She's only eroticized in (modern) paintings, although Burkert notes her virginity is sexualized akin to maidens' of marriageable age. Libanius wrote that Ptolemy was so smitten by the beauty of Antioch's statue of Artemis he took it home, and her mother Leto takes pride in her beauty, in the Odyssey and in a satirical exchange of insults with Hera, who calls Artemis mannish and barbaric.

In the Peloponnese and other regions, Artemis' sanctuaries are often found near springs or wetlands. According to Nilsson, this is how she can become a healing goddess, and of adulthood, marriage, pregnancy, birth, and childcare, although the last is not well-attested. Women offered clothes to Artemis for a happy childbirth on the Acropolis and after death in childbirth according to Euripides. She invented food for children according to Diodorus and women in labor cry out to her for help. Larson views Artemis as a deity of the cities and the rural cults of "hermetic" nymphs as separate.

=== Mistress of Animals and Forests ===
Homer calls Artemis Potnia Theron (πότνια θηρῶν), lit. 'mistress of animals', a title associated with depictions as a woman between a pair of animals, found in art going back as far as the Bronze Age. On a Greek vase from circa 570 BCE, a winged Artemis stands between a spotted panther and a deer. During the annual Laphria festival, in Delphi, Patras, and central Greece, wild animals were burned as a sacrifice to Artemis, likely as mistress of animals.

In some cults she may have retained the shape of a bear (άρκτος árktos, f.: bear) from a Pre-Greek animal form. Kallisto is another bear form or hypostasis of Artemis in Arcadia and immortalized as constellation. Both could be misleading, but show her connection to animals. Her cults at Brauron and at Piraeus (Munichia) are known for the arkteia festival in which girls "imitated bears" in worship to Artemis, replacing a human sacrifice according to myths.

More generally, she is depicted with stags or boars, rarely with domesticated animals. The wild side of Potnia Theron allowed closer association of Artemis with daimons or apotropaic gorgons and later identification with Hecate, as did her depiction as torchbearer.

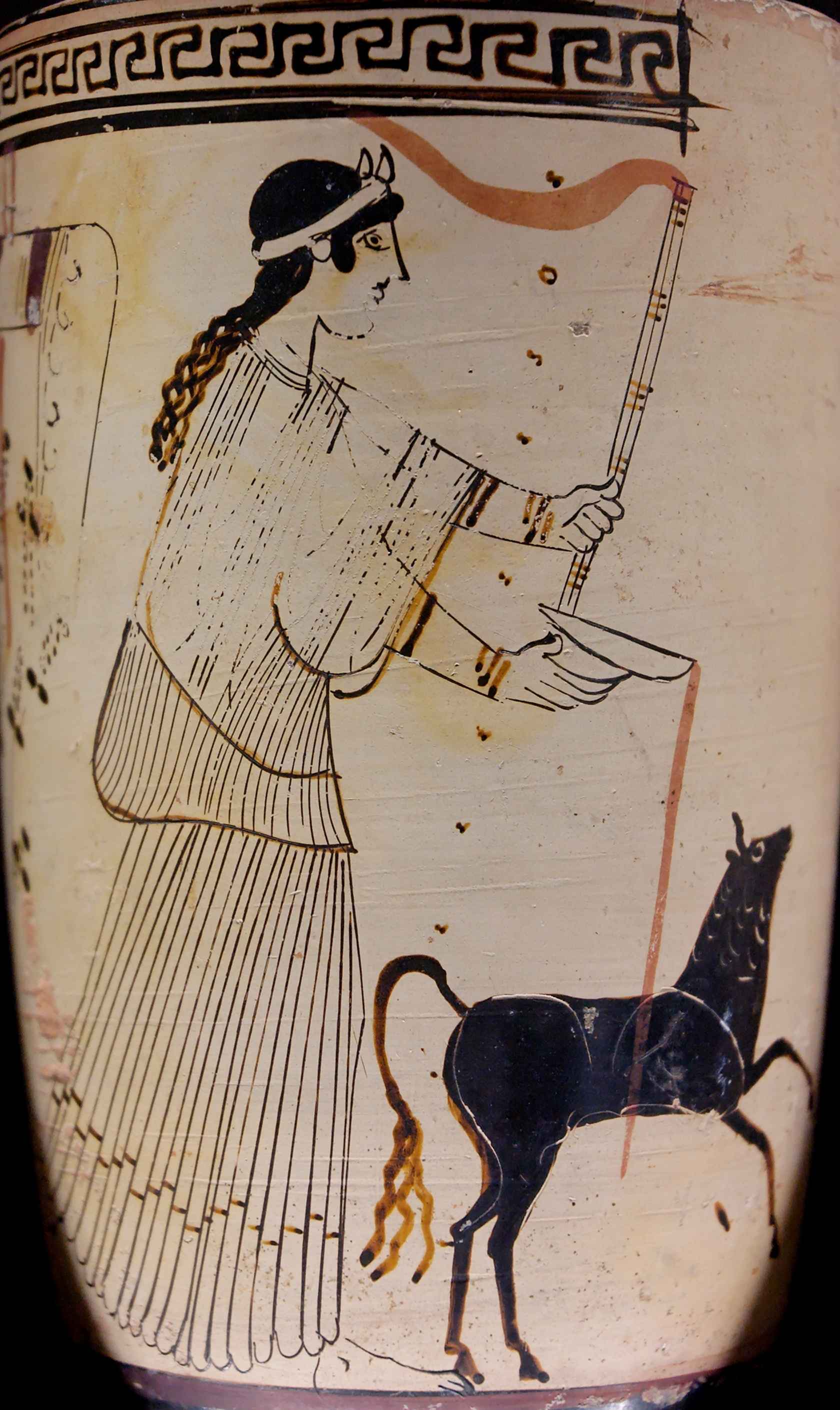
Artemis pouring a libation. Attic white-ground lekythos, c. 460–450 BCE. From Eretria. Attributed to Bowdoin Painter. Louvre, Paris

The Dorians interpreted Artemis mainly as goddess of vegetation who was worshipped in an orgiastic cult with lascivious dances. The "horny" dances, named as such in Greek, were widespread in antiquity, some masked, and both masks' and dancers' genders varied. The forest goddess may descend from a tree cult with temples near holy trees, and was at times identified with the trees.

Artemis has roots in the less understood Mycenaean goddess of nature. This deity was concerned with birth and vegetation and had chthonic aspects. The Mycenaean goddess was related to the Minoan mistress of the animals, who can be traced in later local cults, but is lost in the myths. Thus, how far Minoan and Mycenaean cult diverge remains hard to determine.

== Epithets ==
Artemis had a number of epithets (surnames or titles) applied to her name, reflecting the variety of roles, duties, and aspects ascribed to her. Names like Ephesia or Brauronia mainly refer to (rites in the manner of) certain places. Several of Artemis' epithets may have turned into independent deities, more frequently than other gods'. Some of her epithets were shared by Amazons like Lyceia or Molpadia.

In the Homeric poems, Artemis is mainly the goddess of hunting. In the Iliad and Odyssey she's frequently described as ἰοχέαιρα iocheaira, "she who shoots arrows", often translated as "who delights in arrows" or "who showers arrows", sometimes kelaideini, "clamorer" or "singer", referencing her noisy hunting party. She is called chrysilakatos, "of the golden shafts" or chrysinios "of the golden reins", as a goddess of hunting in her chariot.

Homer also calls her πότνια θηρῶν, Potnia Theron, "mistress of animals". Other epithets that relate Artemis to animals are Agrotera or Agraea "huntress", Elaphebolos, "deer shooter", Amarynthia, Kolainis and Laphria.

In her role as forest deity, she's called Korythalia, "laurel may-branch" Apanchomene, "the hanged", Caryatis, "of the nut tree", and Cedreatis, "of the cedar". Her Spartan epithet Orthia, "the upright", may be related to the tree cult as well, via Lygodesma "willow-bound", as her idol was found wreathed in branches of the unlucky tree. A similar legend was told of Phakelitis "of the sticks" in Sicily.

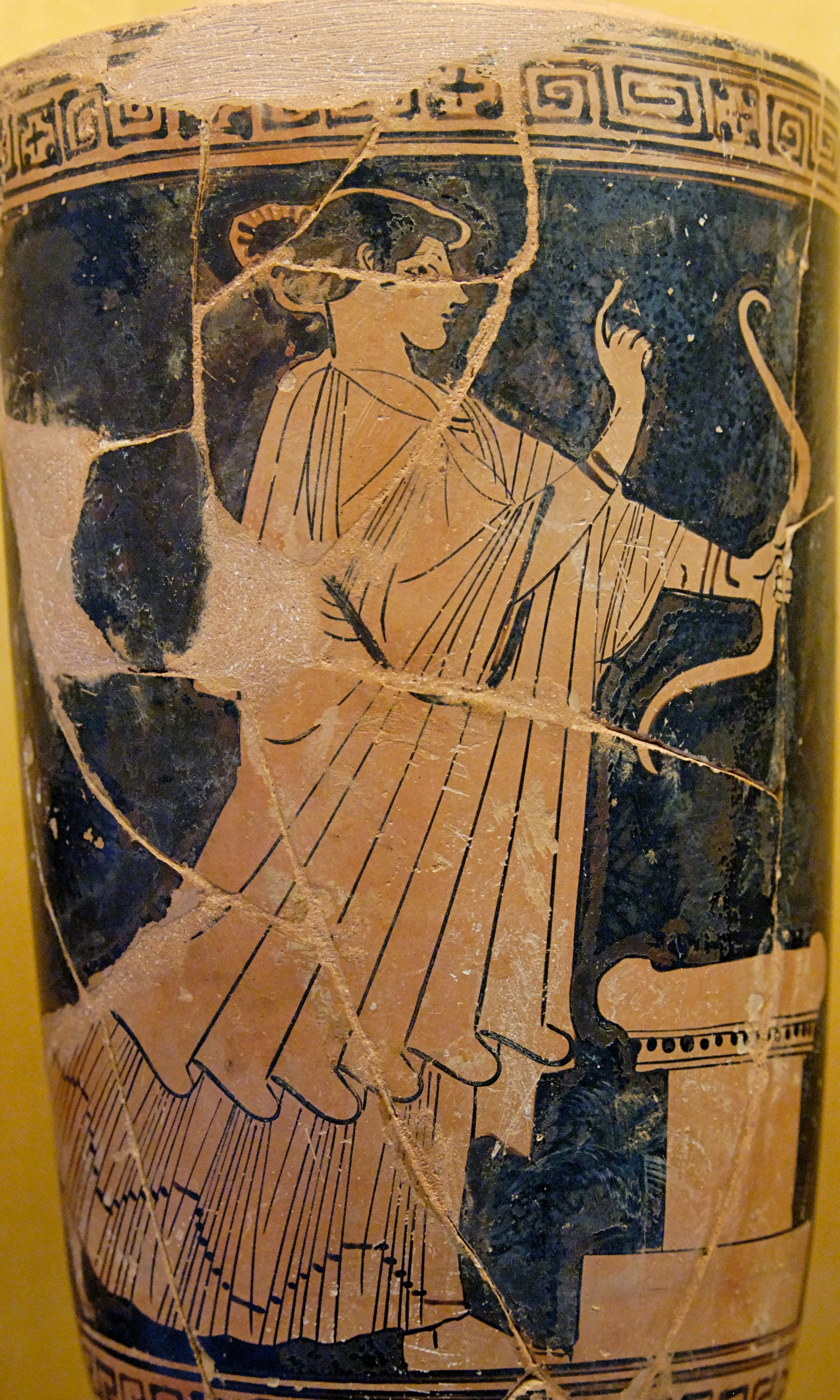
Artemis with bow and arrow in front of an altar. Attic red-figure lekythos, c. 475 BCE, from Selinunte, Sicily. Antonino Salinas Regional Archaeological Museum, Palermo

In the Peloponnese, temples of Artemis were built near springs, rivers, and marshes, connecting her to water and to the sea god Poseidon. Her epithets include Limnnaia, Limnatis, Potamia, and Alphaea, "of the marsh/river". As Saronia and Stymphalia, her temples' founding myths have hunters drown while chasing (her as) a deer. As a healer, she bears names relating her to springs or baths, such as Lousia and Thermia.

Many of Artemis' epithets point to her role in childbirth, chiefly Eileithyia, "helper in need", an epithet shared with Hera and an independent deity, (Eu-)Lochia, "of the (good) birth", also applied to Athena, and Geneiteira, "birth giver". Others include Praos, "the mild", and Oupis, "watcher", as opposed to her deathbringing aspect, Boulosia and Mogotokos, "of the pangs", and Lysizonos, "loosener of the girdle" and by extension the womb, in childbirth, first menstruation and intercourse.

As Eucleia, "good repute", Artemis received pre-marital offerings in Athens, where sculpted cunni and breasts were found, and Boeotia, as Paido- or Kourotrophos, "child nurturer", less attested for her than for other deities, she protected children, and was invoked under many local names during initiation rites into man- or womanhood.

The statue of Artemis Tauria "of the Tauri" was said to give prophetic signs, like other cult images, and take human sacrifices by Herodotus and Euripides. Orestes or Iphigeneia taking her xoanon back to Greece in the tragedy spawned new cults of the mythic goddess: Ancient and modern authors identified her with Tauropolos (Halea Araphenides), Brauronia (Athens), Orthia (Sparta), Aricina (Italy), Anaitis (Lydia) and others. They are mainly based in assimilation of foreign deities and appeal of legend, not on ancient origins, but may explain shared sacrificial and initiation rites.

Artemis as a torchbearer was called Elaphebolos Amphipyros, "of both fires", a torch in each hand, Phosphoros and Selasphoros, "lightbearer", and was identified with Hecate, although her cults are late and isolated. In Athens, the torchbearer was worshipped as Artemis Kalliste "the most beautiful" and Ariste "the best", likely unrelated to the older Arcadian Kalliste/Callisto.

== Mythology ==
=== Birth ===
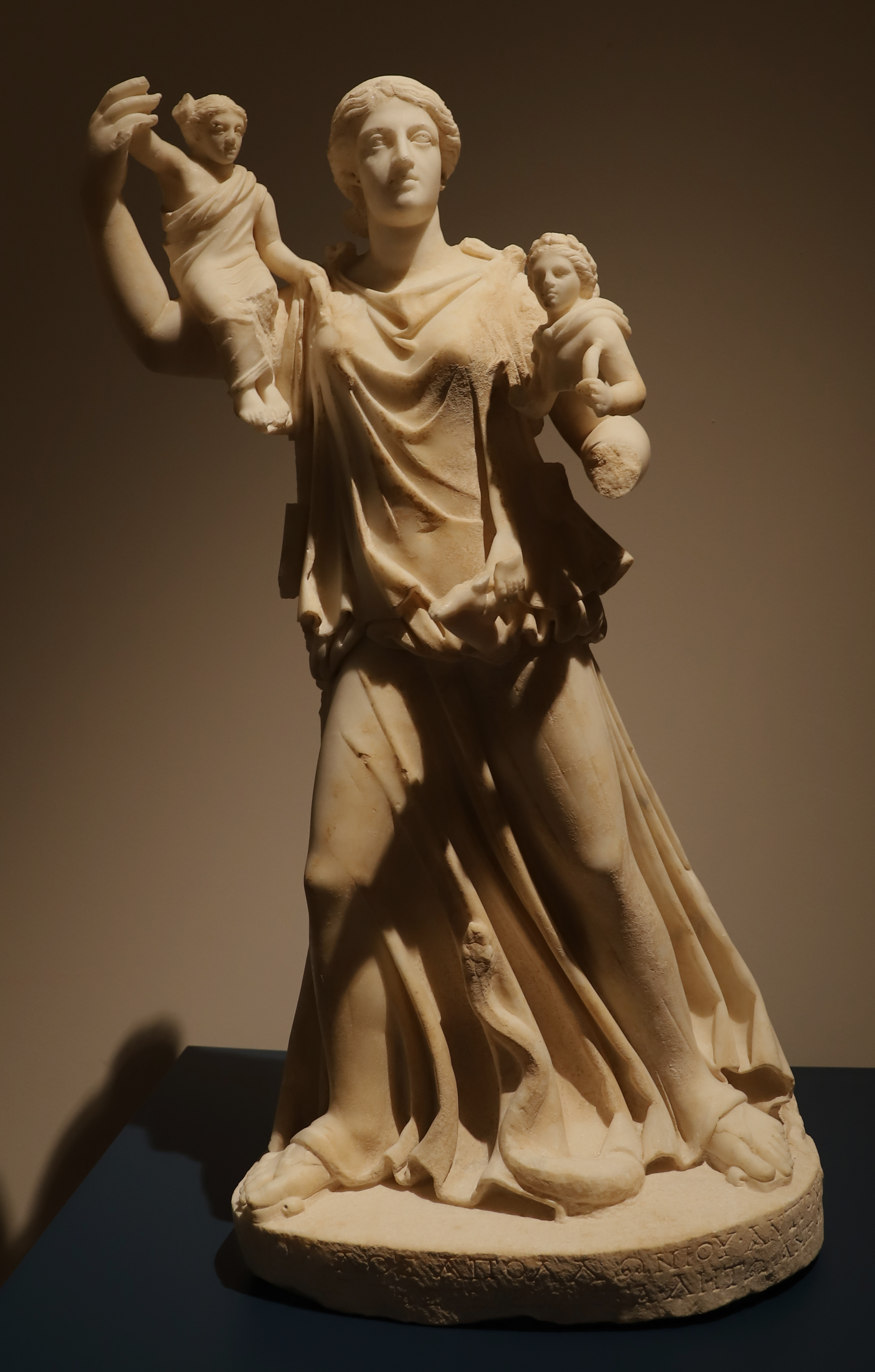
Leto on the run with Artemis and Apollo, Roman statue circa 350–400 CE

All accounts agree that Artemis was the daughter of Zeus and Leto and the twin sister of Apollo. In some sources, the two are born at the same time, and in others one is born before the other. Although traditionally stated to be twins, the author of The Homeric Hymn 3 to Apollo (the oldest extant account of Leto's wandering and the birth of her children) is only concerned with the birth of Apollo, and sidelines Artemis with a later poet, Pindar, speaking of a single pregnancy. The two earliest Greek poets, Homer and Hesiod, confirm Artemis and Apollo's status as full siblings, but neither explicitly makes them twins.

According to Callimachus, Hera, who was angry with her husband Zeus for impregnating Leto, forbade her from giving birth on either terra firma (the mainland) or on an island, but the island of Delos disobeyed and allowed Leto to give birth there; this rooted the once freely floating island to one place. According to the Homeric Hymn to Artemis, the island where she and her twin were born was Ortygia. In Cretan mythology, Leto gave birth to Apollo and Artemis on the islands known today as Paximadia. Servius, commenting on Virgil's Aeneid, accounts for the island's archaic name Ortygia by asserting that Zeus transformed Leto into a quail (ortux) to prevent Hera from finding out about his infidelity, and Kenneth McLeish suggested further that in quail form, Leto would have given birth with as few birth-pains as a mother quail suffers when she lays an egg.

The myths also differ as to whether Artemis was born first, or Apollo. According to Apollodorus, she was born first, and assisted in the delivery of Apollo. Servius, a late-fourth or early-fifth-century grammarian, wrote that Artemis was born first because at first it was night, whose instrument is the Moon, which Artemis represents, and then day, whose instrument is the Sun, which Apollo represents. Pindar however writes that both twins shone like the Sun when they came into the bright light.

After their troubling childbirth, Leto took the twin infants and crossed over to Lycia, in the southwest corner of Asia Minor, where she tried to drink from and bathe the babies in a spring she found there. However, the local Lycian peasants tried to prevent the twins and their mother from making use of the water by stirring up the muddy bottom of the spring, so the three of them could not drink it. Leto, in her anger that the impious Lycians had refused to offer hospitality to a fatigued mother and her thirsty infants, transformed them all into frogs, forever doomed to swim and hop around the spring.

=== Relations with men ===
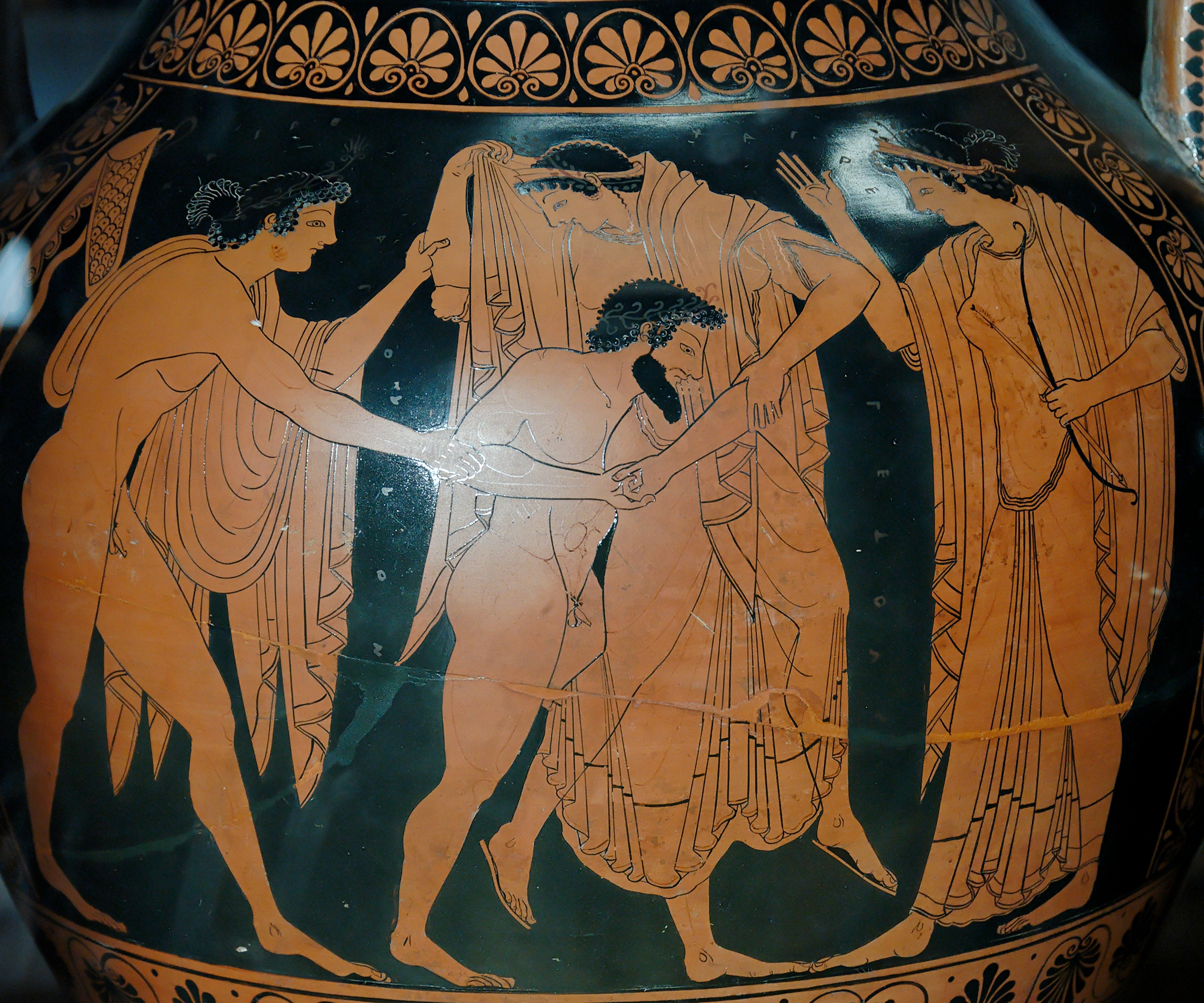
The rape of Leto by Tityos: Apollo (left), tries to grasp Tityos, Leto (middle) pushes him and Artemis (right), ready to stop him. Attic red-figure amphora from Vulci. c. 510–520 BCE, by Phintias Painter. Louvre, Paris.

When the giant Tityos tried to rape Leto, she called out to her children, who were still young, for help. The twins were quick to respond by raining down their arrows on Tityos, killing him. For his actions against Leto, Tityos was banished to Tartarus, where he was pegged to the rock floor and stretched on an area of 9 acres (3.6 ha), while a pair of vultures feasted daily on his liver or his heart.

The twin sons of Poseidon and Iphimedeia, Otos and Ephialtes, known as the Aloadae, grew enormously at a young age. They were aggressive and skilled hunters who could not be killed except by each other. They never stopped growing and boasted that as soon as they could reach heaven, they would kidnap Artemis and Hera and take them as wives. The gods were afraid of them, except for Artemis who captured a fine deer that jumped out between them. In another version of the story, she changed herself into a doe and jumped between them. The Aloadae threw their spears, mistakenly killing one another. In another version, Apollo sent the deer into the Aloadae's midst, causing their accidental killing of each other. In another version, the Aloadae start piling up mountains to reach Mount Olympus, but the gods spot them and attack; once the twins had retreated, the gods learnt that Ares had been captured. Unsure what to do with him, the Aloedae lock him up in a pot. Artemis then turns into a deer and causes them to kill each other.

According to Diodorus, Britomartis was a nymph and a huntress known for her use of nets, for which she became a beloved companion of Artemis. Minos, king of Crete and a half-brother of Artemis, took interest in Britomartis and pursued her for nine months. Britomartis continually fled his advances, and to escape, she at last leapt into the sea (possibly from Mount Dikte) and landed in fishermen's nets. She became entangled but was rescued by Artemis, who then made her a goddess.

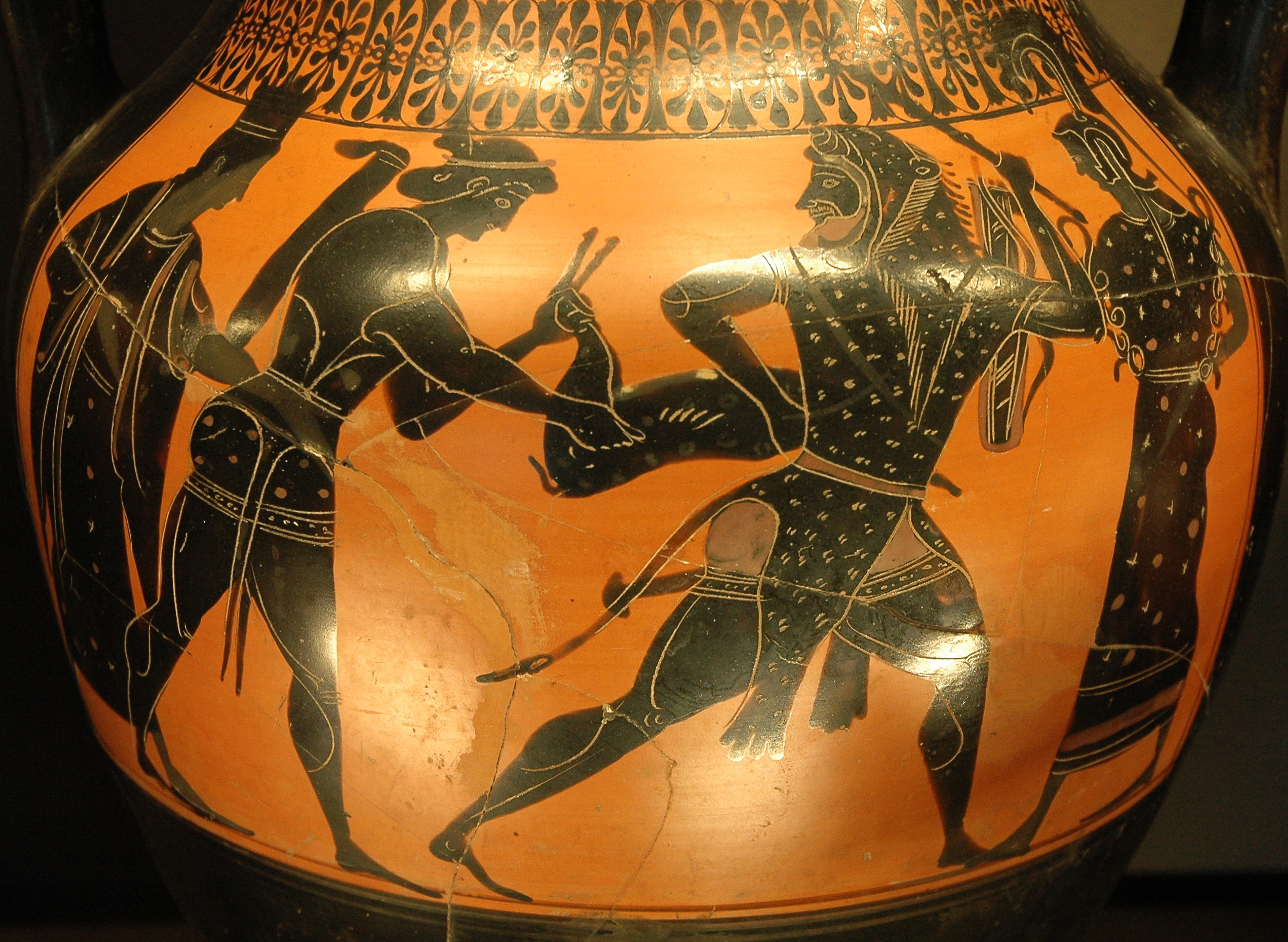
Artemis (left) and Apollo try to get the Ceryneian Hind from Heracles. Detail of an Attic black-figure amphora c. 530–520 BCE. Louvre, Paris

Eurystheus commanded Heracles to catch the Ceryneian Hind in the hope that it would enrage Artemis and lead her to punish the hero for his desecration of her sacred animal. The Cerynian hind used to be the Pleiad Taygete, known as the "Mistress of Animals" and a dear companion of Artemis. One day, Zeus pursued Taygete, who invoked her protectress, who in turn saved her from her father by turning her into the hind. As Heracles was returning with the hind to present it to Eurystheus, he encountered Artemis and her brother Apollo. He begged the goddess for forgiveness, explaining that he had snared the hind as part of his penance, but promised to return it to the wild soon thereafter. Convinced by Heracles's earnestness, she forgave him, foiling Eurystheus's plan.

The river god Alpheus was in love with Artemis, but as he realized he could do nothing to win her heart, he decided to capture her. When Artemis and her companions at Letrenoi go to Alpheus, she becomes suspicious of his motives and covers her face with mud so he does not recognize her. In another story, Alphaeus tries to rape Artemis's attendant Arethusa. Artemis pities the girl and saves her, transforming her into a spring in the temple Artemis Alphaea in Letrini, where the goddess and her attendants drink.

According to Antoninus Liberalis, Siproites was a Cretan who was metamorphized into a woman by Artemis for having seen the goddess bathing while he was hunting. Artemis similarly changed a Calydonian man named Calydon, the son of Ares and Astynome, into a stone when he accidentally saw the goddess bathing naked.

Daphnis was a young boy, a son of Hermes, who was accepted by and became a follower of the goddess Artemis; Daphnis would often accompany her in hunting and entertain her with his singing of pastoral songs and playing of the panpipes.

Artemis taught a man, Scamandrius, how to be a great archer, and he excelled in the use of a bow and arrow with her guidance.

Bouphagos, son of the Titan Iapetus, sees Artemis and thinks about raping her. Reading his sinful thoughts, Artemis strikes him down at Mount Pholoe.

Broteas was a famous hunter who refused to honour Artemis, and boasted that nothing could harm him, not even fire. Artemis then drove him mad, causing him to walk into fire, ending his life.

=== Divine retribution ===
==== Actaeon ====
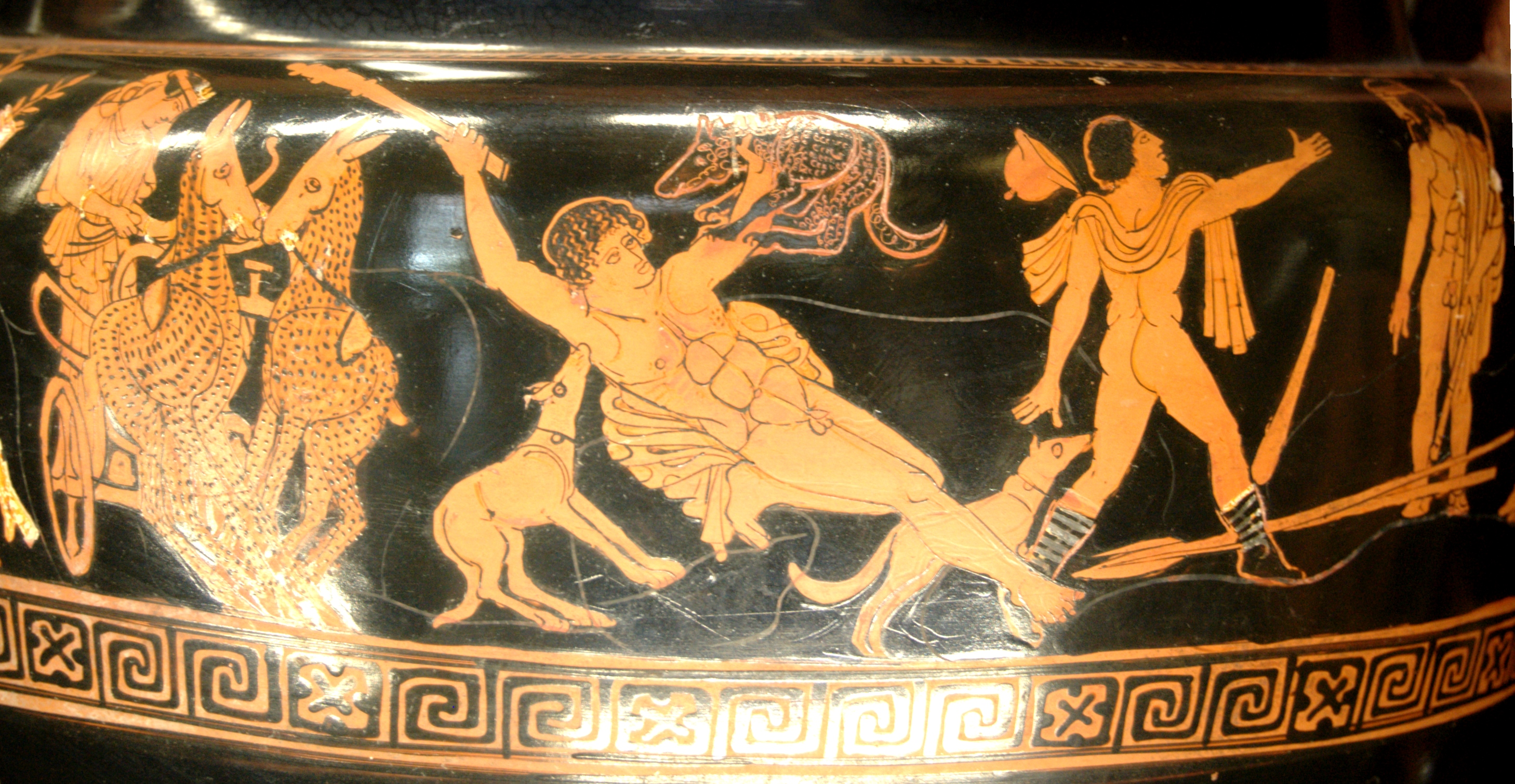
Artemis drives a chariot drawn by a team of deer next to the dying Actaeon. Attic red-figure volute crater, c. 450–440 BCE by the Painter of the Wooly Satyrs. Louvre, Paris.

Multiple versions of the Actaeon myth survive, though many are fragmentary. The hunter Actaeon is turned into a stag by Artemis, as punishment for a transgression, and is then killed by hunting dogs. Usually, these dogs are his own, and no longer recognize their master, though they are sometimes said to be the hounds of Artemis.

In different sources, Actaeon's transgression is viewing Artemis naked, boasting he is a better hunter than her, or trying to rival Zeus for Semele's affection. Apollodorus, who records this last version, notes that the others are more common.

According to Lamar Ronald Lacey's The Myth of Aktaion: Literary and Iconographic Studies, the original version of the myth most likely portrayed Actaeon as the hunting companion of the goddess, who, after seeing her naked in her sacred spring, attempted to force himself on her. For this, he is turned into a stag and devoured by his own hounds. In some surviving versions, though, Actaeon is a stranger who happens upon Artemis.

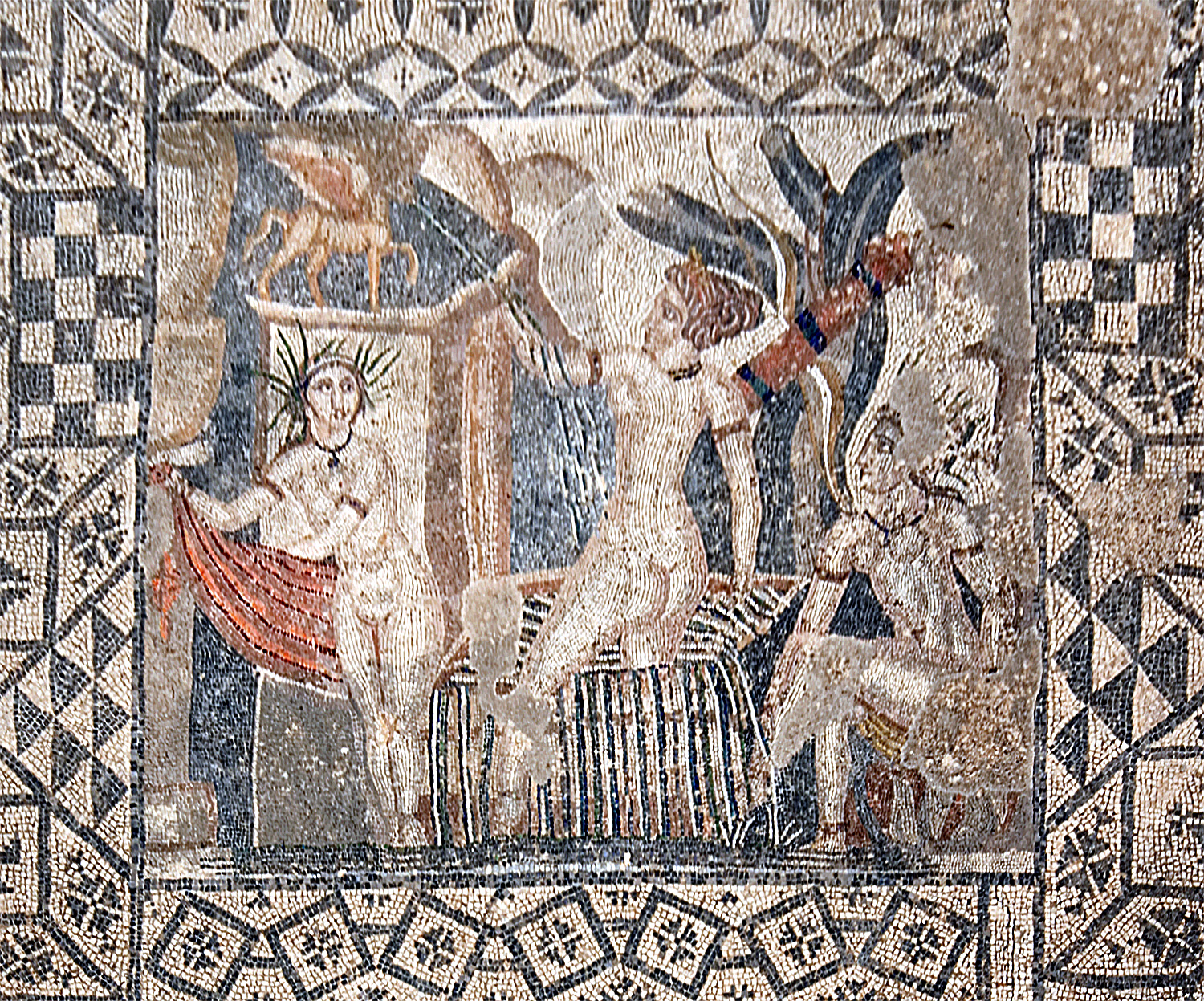
Mosaic depicting Diana and her nymph surprised by Actaeon.Mosaic, 2nd century CE Ruins of Volubilis, Morocco

A single line from Aeschylus's now lost play Toxotides ("female archers") is among the earlier attestations of Actaeon's myth, stating that "the dogs destroyed their master utterly", with no confirmation of Actaeon's metamorphosis or the god he offended (but it is heavily implied to be Artemis, due to the title). Ancient artwork depicting the myth of Actaeon predate Aeschylus. Euripides, coming in a bit later, wrote in the Bacchae that Actaeon was torn to shreds and perhaps devoured by his "flesh-eating" hunting dogs when he claimed to be a better hunter than Artemis. Like Aeschylus, he does not mention Actaeon being deer-shaped when that happens. In his Hymn to Athena, Callimachus writes that Actaeon chanced upon Artemis bathing in the woods, and she caused him to be devoured by his own hounds for the sacrilege, and he makes no mention of transformation into a deer either.

Diodorus Siculus wrote that Actaeon dedicated his prizes in hunting to Artemis, proposed marriage to her, and even tried to forcefully consummate said "marriage" inside the very sacred temple of the goddess; for this he was given the form "of one of the animals which he was wont to hunt", and then torn to shreds by his hunting dogs. Diodorus also mentioned the alternative of Actaeon claiming to be a better hunter than the goddess of the hunt. Hyginus also mentions Actaeon attempting to rape Artemis when he finds her bathing naked, and her transforming him into the doomed deer.

Apollodorus wrote that when Actaeon saw Artemis bathing, she turned him into a deer on the spot, and intentionally drove his dogs into a frenzy so that they would kill and devour him. Afterward, Chiron built a sculpture of Actaeon to comfort his dogs in their grief, as they could not find their master no matter how much they looked for him.

According to the Latin version of the story told by the Roman Ovid, Actaeon was a hunter who after returning home from a long day's hunting in the woods, he stumbled upon Artemis and her retinue of nymphs bathing in her sacred grotto. The nymphs, panicking, rushed to cover Artemis's naked body with their own, as Artemis splashed some water on Actaeon, saying he was welcome to share with everyone the tale of seeing her without any clothes as long as he could share it at all. Immediately, he was transformed into a deer, and in panic ran away. But he did not go far, as he was hunted down and eventually caught and devoured by his own fifty hunting dogs, who could not recognize their own master.

Pausanias says that Actaeon saw Artemis naked and that she threw a deerskin on him so that his hounds would kill him, to prevent him from marrying Semele.

==== Niobe ====
Niobe, queen of Thebes and wife of Amphion, blasphemously boasted of being superior to Leto. This myth is very old; Homer knew of it and wrote that Niobe had given birth to twelve children, equally divided in six sons and six daughters (the Niobids). Other sources speak of fourteen children, seven sons, and seven daughters. Niobe claimed to be a better mother than Leto, for having more children than Leto's own two, "but the two, though they were only two, destroyed all those others." She also mocked Apollo's effeminate appearance and Artemis's manly appearance. Leto was not slow to catch up on that and grew angry at the queen's hubris. She summoned her children and commanded them to avenge the slight.

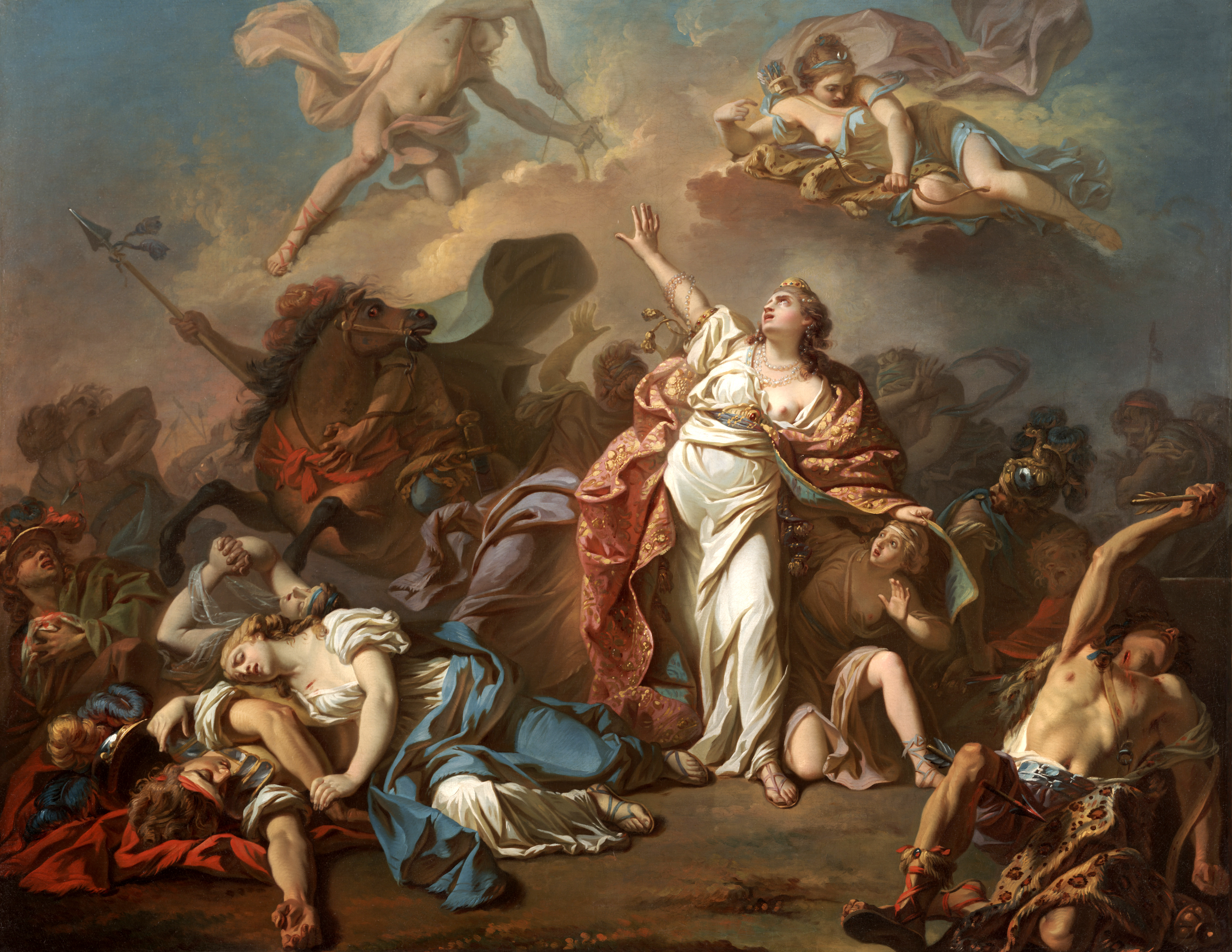
A 1772 painting by Jacques-Louis David depicting Niobe attempting to shield her children from Artemis and Apollo. Dallas Museum of Art, Dallas.

Swiftly Apollo and Artemis descended on Thebes. While the sons were hunting in the woods, Apollo crept up on them and slew all seven with his silver bow. The dead bodies were brought to the palace. Niobe wept for them, but did not relent, saying that even now she was better than Leto, for she still had seven children, her daughters.

On cue, Artemis then started shooting the daughters one by one. Right as Niobe begged for her youngest one to be spared, Artemis killed that last one. Niobe cried bitter tears, and was turned into a rock. Amphion, at the sight of his dead sons, killed himself. The gods themselves entombed them. In some versions, Apollo and Artemis spared a single son and daughter each, for they prayed to Leto for help; thus Niobe had as many children as Leto did, but no more.

==== Orion ====
Orion was Artemis's hunting companion; after giving up on trying to find Oenopion, Orion met Artemis and her mother Leto, and joined the goddesses in hunting. A great hunter himself, he bragged that he would kill every beast on earth. Gaia, the earth, was not too pleased to hear that, and sent a giant scorpion to sting him. Artemis then transferred him into the stars as the constellation Orion. In one version Orion died after pushing Leto out of the scorpion's way.

In another version, Orion tries to violate Opis, one of Artemis's followers from Hyperborea, and Artemis kills him. In a version by Aratus, Orion grabs Artemis's robe and she kills him in self-defense. Other writers have Artemis kill him for trying to rape her or one of her attendants.

Istrus wrote a version in which Artemis fell in love with Orion, apparently the only time Artemis ever fell in love. She meant to marry him, and no talk from her brother Apollo would change her mind. Apollo then decided to trick Artemis, and while Orion was off swimming in the sea, he pointed at him (barely a spot in the horizon) and wagered that Artemis could not hit that small "dot". Artemis, ever eager to prove she was the better archer, unwittingly shot Orion, killing him. The waves then brought his body to the shore, and Artemis mourned his death. Afterwards, she placed him among the stars.

In Homer's Iliad, the goddess of the dawn Eos seduces Orion, angering the gods who did not approve of immortal goddesses taking mortal men for lovers, causing Artemis to shoot and kill him on the island of Ortygia.

==== Callisto ====
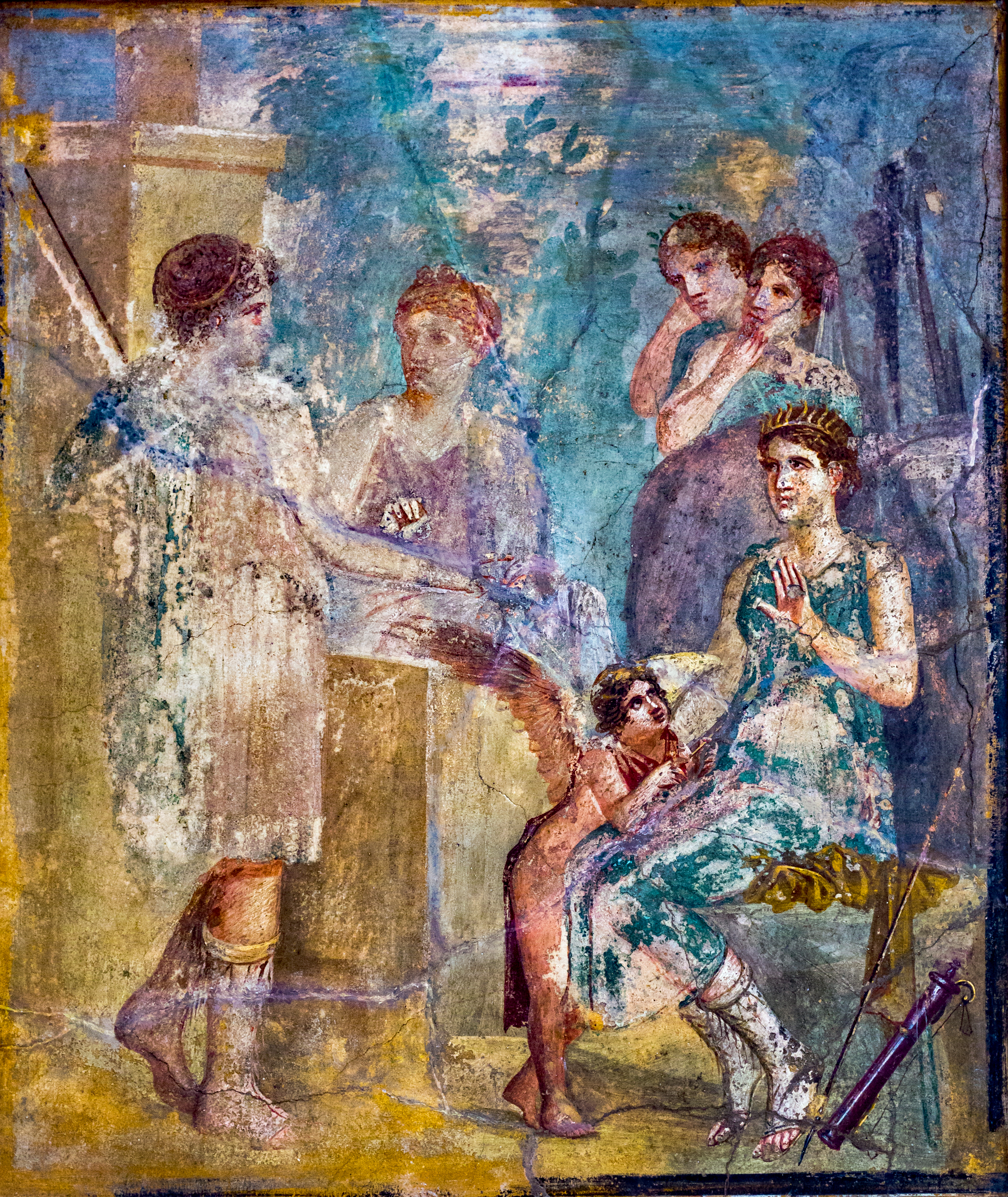
Artemis (seated and wearing a radiate crown), the beautiful nymph Callisto (left), Eros and other nymphs. Antique fresco from Pompeii. National Archaeological Museum, Naples.

Callisto, the daughter of Lycaon, King of Arcadia, was one of Artemis's hunting attendants, and, as a companion of Artemis, took a vow of chastity.

According to Hesiod in his lost poem Astronomia, Zeus appeared to Callisto, and seduced her, resulting in her becoming pregnant. Though she was able to hide her pregnancy for a time, she was soon found out while bathing. Enraged, Artemis transformed Callisto into a bear, and in this form she gave birth to her son Arcas. Both of them were then captured by shepherds and given to Lycaon, and Callisto thus lost her child. Sometime later, Callisto "thought fit to go into" a forbidden sanctuary of Zeus, and was hunted by the Arcadians, her son among them. When she was about to be killed, Zeus saved her by placing her in the heavens as a constellation of a bear.

In his De astronomia, Hyginus, after recounting the version from Hesiod, presents several other alternative versions. The first, which he attributes to Amphis, says that Zeus seduced Callisto by disguising himself as Artemis during a hunting session, and that when Artemis found out that Callisto was pregnant, she replied saying that it was the goddess's fault, causing Artemis to transform her into a bear. This version also has both Callisto and Arcas placed in the heavens, as the constellations Ursa Major and Ursa Minor. Hyginus then presents another version in which, after Zeus lay with Callisto, it was Hera who transformed her into a bear. Artemis later, while hunting, kills the bear, and "later, on being recognized, Callisto was placed among the stars". Hyginus also gives another version, in which Hera tries to catch Zeus and Callisto in the act, causing Zeus to transform her into a bear. Hera, finding the bear, points it out to Artemis, who is hunting; Zeus, in panic, places Callisto in the heavens as a constellation. Ovid gives a somewhat different version: Zeus seduced Callisto once again disguised as Artemis, but she seems to realise that it is not the real Artemis, and she thus does not blame Artemis when, during bathing, she is found out. Callisto is, rather than being transformed, simply ousted from the company of the huntresses, and she thus gives birth to Arcas as a human. Only later is she transformed into a bear, this time by Hera. When Arcas, fully grown, is out hunting, he nearly kills his mother, who is saved only by Zeus placing her in the heavens.

In the Bibliotheca, a version is presented in which Zeus raped Callisto, "having assumed the likeness, as some say, of Artemis, or, as others say, of Apollo". He then turned her into a bear himself so as to hide the event from Hera. Artemis then shot the bear, either upon the persuasion of Hera, or out of anger at Callisto for breaking her virginity. Once Callisto was dead, Zeus made her into a constellation, took the child, named him Arcas, and gave him to Maia, who raised him.

Pausanias, in his Description of Greece, presents another version, in which, after Zeus seduced Callisto, Hera turned her into a bear, which Artemis killed to please Hera. Hermes was then sent by Zeus to take Arcas, and Zeus himself placed Callisto in the heavens.

=== Minor myths ===
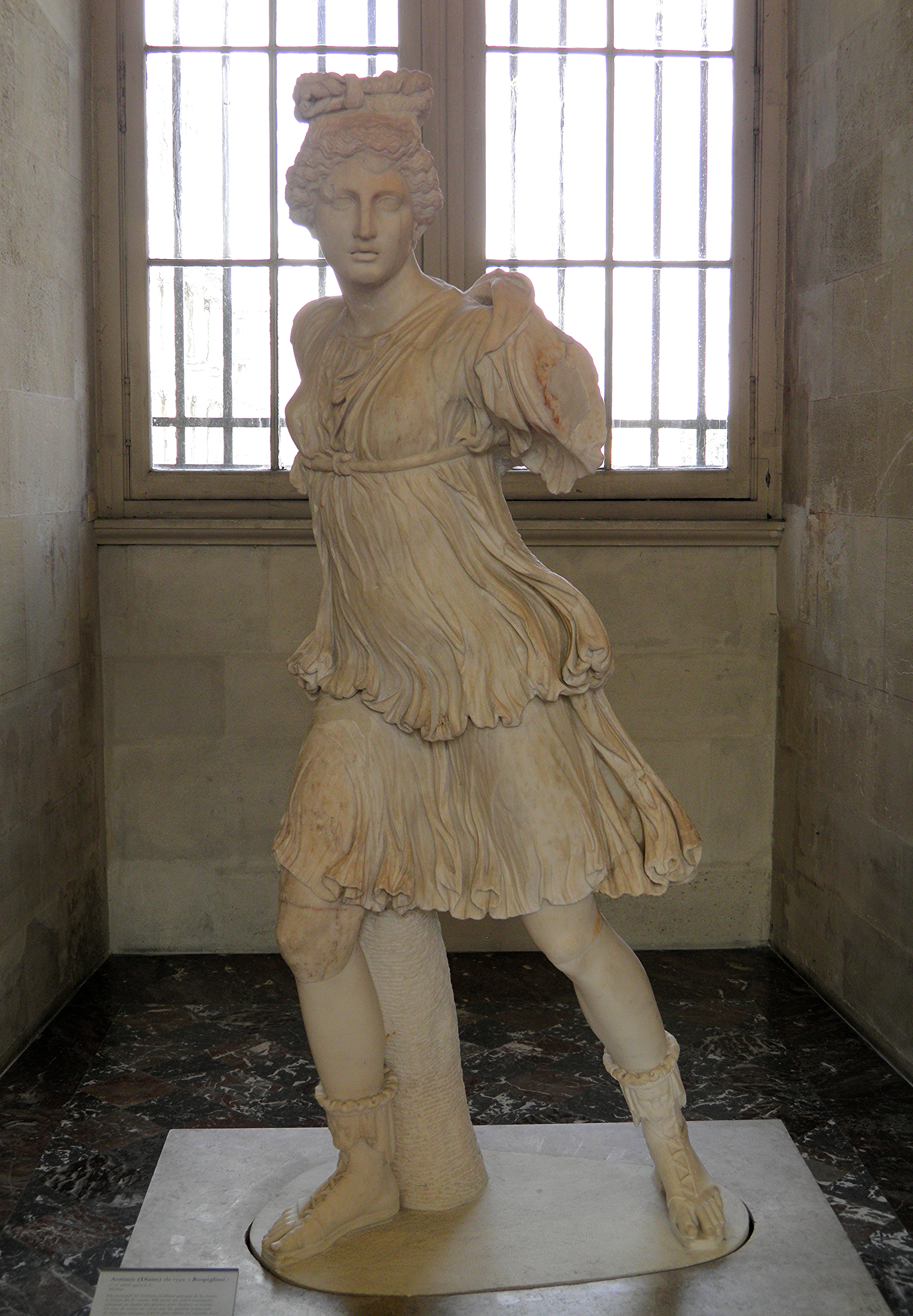
Artemis (Diana) from the "Rospigliosi type", Roman copy of the 1st–2nd centuries CE after a Hellenistic original, Louvre Museum.

When the monstrous Typhon attacked Olympus, all the terrified gods except for Zeus transformed into various animals and fled to Egypt. Artemis became a cat, as she was identified by the Greeks with the Egyptian feline goddess Bastet.

Artemis saved the infant Atalanta from dying of exposure after her father abandoned her. She sent a female bear to nurse the baby, who was then raised by hunters and grew to model herself after the goddess. In some stories, Artemis later sent a bear to attack Atalanta because others claimed Atalanta was a superior hunter. Among other adventures, Atalanta participated in the Calydonian boar hunt, which Artemis had sent to destroy Calydon because King Oeneus had forgotten her at the harvest sacrifices. In the hunt, Atalanta drew the first blood and was awarded the prize of the boar's hide. She hung it in a sacred grove at Tegea as a dedication to Artemis. After the death of Meleager, Oeneus's son who awarded Atalanta with the hide, Artemis turned his grieving sisters, the Meleagrids, into guineafowl she favours.

Cyrene was a fierce Thessalian huntress and companion of Artemis, who had given her two hunting dogs. With the help of these dogs, Cyrene had been able to win the prize in the funeral games of Pelias. When King Eurypylus was still ruling Libya, a monstrous lion had terrorized the citizens greatly, so Apollo brought Cyrene to get rid of it. After she killed the lion, he made her the new ruler of the lands, renamed Cyrene in her honor. In some versions, she was transformed into a nymph so that she could have a long life and keep hunting with Artemis as much as she desired.

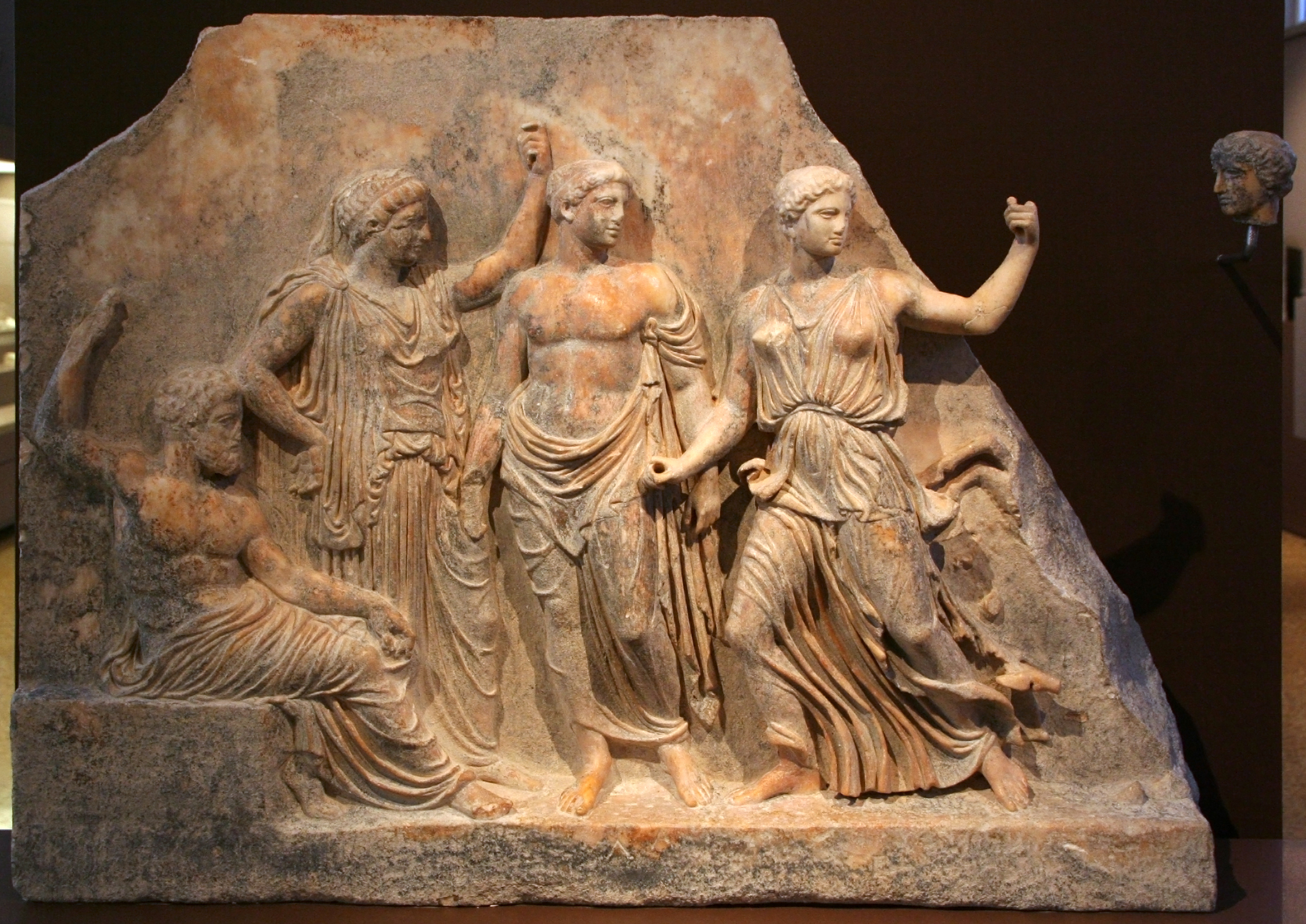
Leto with Zeus and their children, 420–410 BCE, marble, Archaeological Museum of Brauron

In a story from Valerius Flaccus, Artemis and her mother Leto stood before Zeus with tearful eyes while Apollo pleaded with him to release Prometheus (the god who had stolen fire from the gods, given it to humans, and been chained in the Caucasus with an eagle feasting on his liver each day as punishment). Moved, Zeus agreed and commanded Heracles to free Prometheus.

In some versions of the story of Adonis, Artemis sent a wild boar to kill him as punishment for boasting that he was a better hunter than her. In other versions, Artemis killed Adonis for revenge. In later myths, Adonis is a favorite of Aphrodite, who was responsible for the death of Hippolytus, who had been a hunter of Artemis. Therefore, Artemis killed Adonis to avenge Hippolytus's death. In yet another version, Adonis was not killed by Artemis, but by Ares as punishment for being with Aphrodite.

When two of her hunting companions who had sworn to remain chaste and be devoted to her, Rhodopis and Euthynicus, fell in love with each other and broke their vows in a cavern, Artemis turned Rhodopis into a fountain inside that very cavern as punishment. The two had fallen in love not on their own but only after Eros had struck them with his love arrows, commanded by his mother Aphrodite, who had taken offence in that Rhodopis and Euthynicus rejected love and marriage in favour of a chaste life.

In Nonnus's Dionysiaca, Aura, the daughter of Lelantos and Periboia, was a companion of Artemis. When out hunting one day with Artemis, she asserts that the goddess's voluptuous body and breasts are too womanly and sensual, and doubts her virginity, arguing that her own lithe body and man-like breasts are better than Artemis's and a true symbol of her own chastity. In anger, Artemis asks Nemesis for help to avenge her dignity. Nemesis agrees, telling Artemis that Aura's punishment will be to lose her virginity, since she dared question that of Artemis. Nemesis then arranges for Eros to make Dionysus fall in love with Aura. Dionysus intoxicates Aura and rapes her as she lies unconscious, after which she becomes a deranged killer. While pregnant, she tries to kill herself or cut open her belly, as Artemis mocks her over it. When she bore twin sons, she ate one, while the other, Iacchus, was saved by Artemis.

Chione was a beautiful princess of Phocis. She was beloved by two gods, Hermes and Apollo, and boasted that she was more beautiful than Artemis because she had made two gods fall in love with her at once. Artemis was furious and pierced Chione's blasphemous tongue with an arrow, leaving the girl to choke in her own blood.

Polyphonte was a young woman who fled home in pursuit of a free, virginal life with Artemis, as opposed to the conventional life of marriage and children favoured by Aphrodite. As a punishment, Aphrodite cursed her, causing her to mate and have children with a bear. Artemis, seeing that, was disgusted and sent a horde of wild animals against her, causing Polyphonte to flee to her father's house. Her resulting offspring, Agrius and Oreius, were wild cannibals who incurred the hatred of Zeus. Ultimately the entire family was transformed into birds who became ill portents for mankind.

Coronis was a princess from Thessaly who became the lover of Apollo and fell pregnant. While Apollo was away, Coronis began an affair with a mortal man named Ischys. When Apollo learnt of this, he sent Artemis to kill the pregnant Coronis, or Artemis had the initiative to kill Coronis on her own accord for the insult done against her brother. The unborn child, Asclepius, was later removed from his dead mother's womb.

=== Trojan War ===
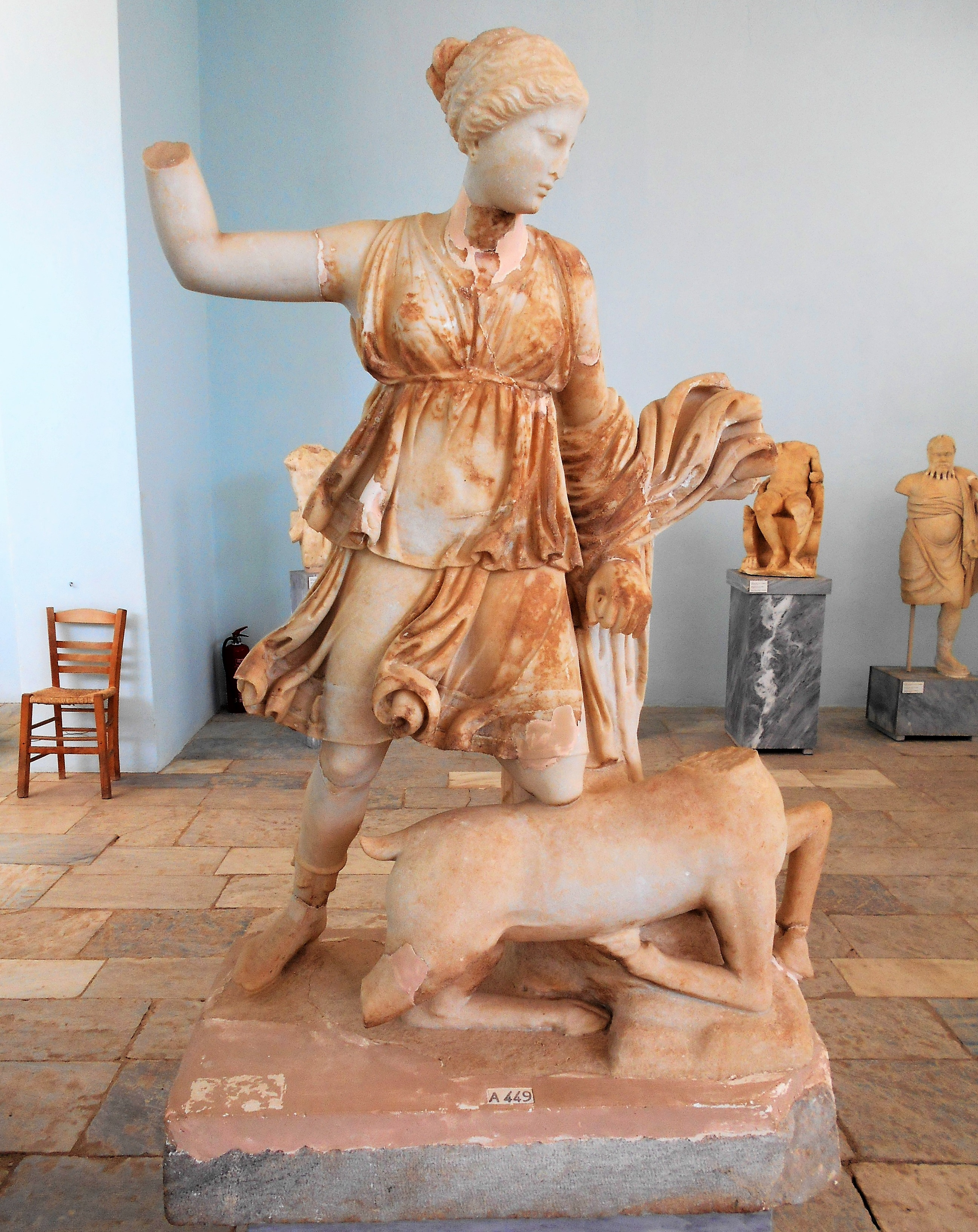
Artemis slaying a deer, from the courtyard of House III, 125–100 BCE. Archaeological Museum of Delos, Greece.

Artemis may have been represented as a supporter of Troy because her brother Apollo was the patron god of the city, and she herself was widely worshipped in western Anatolia in historical times. Artemis plays a significant role in the war; like Leto and Apollo, Artemis took the side of the Trojans. In the Iliad, Artemis on her chariot with the golden reins, kills the daughter of Bellerophon. Bellorophon was a divine Greek hero who killed the monster Chimera. At the beginning of the Greek's journey to Troy, Artemis punished Agamemnon after he killed a sacred stag in a sacred grove and boasted that he was a better hunter than the goddess.

When the Greek fleet was preparing at Aulis to depart for Troy to commence the Trojan War, Artemis becalmed the winds. The seer Calchas erroneously advised Agamemnon that the only way to appease Artemis was to sacrifice his daughter Iphigenia. In some version of the myth, Artemis then snatched Iphigenia from the altar and substituted a deer; in others, Artemis allowed Iphigenia to be sacrificed. In versions where Iphigenia survived, a number of different myths have been told about what happened after Artemis took her; either she was brought to Tauris and led the priests there, or she became Artemis's immortal companion. Aeneas was also helped by Artemis, Leto, and Apollo. Apollo found him wounded by Diomedes and lifted him to heaven. There, the three deities secretly healed him in a great chamber.

During the theomachy, Artemis found herself standing opposite of Hera, on which a scholium to the Iliad wrote that they represent the Moon versus the air around the Earth. Artemis chided her brother Apollo for not fighting Poseidon and told him never to brag again; Apollo did not answer her. An angry Hera berated Artemis for daring to fight her:

How now art thou fain, thou bold and shameless thing, to stand forth against me? No easy foe I tell thee, am I, that thou shouldst vie with me in might, albeit thou bearest the bow, since it was against women that Zeus made thee a lion, and granted thee to slay whomsoever of them thou wilt. In good sooth it is better on the mountains to be slaying beasts and wild deer than to fight amain with those mightier than thou. Howbeit if thou wilt, learn thou of war, that thou mayest know full well how much mightier am I, seeing thou matchest thy strength with mine.

Hera then grabbed Artemis's hands by the wrists, and holding her in place, beat her with her own bow. Crying, Artemis left her bow and arrows where they lay and ran to Olympus to cry at her father Zeus's knees, while her mother Leto picked up her bow and arrows and followed her weeping daughter.

== Worship ==
Artemis was worshipped throughout ancient Greece, with many local variations in practice. Her best known cults were on the island of Delos (her birthplace), in Attica at Brauron and Mounikhia (near Piraeus), and in Sparta. The cult at Ephesus (in Asia minor, her other birthplace) eventually surpassed other local cults in fame, before the 1st century CE.

Common practices included animal sacrifice, often during festivals, accompanied by hymns, dances and processions, votive offerings of jewelry, clothing or pottery for personal favor or as thanks, and rites of passage or initiation. Her temples were commonly outside city limits or in places between land and water. There is no evidence of human sacrifice outside of myths and origin stories of some cults.

Dedication of clothing to her sanctuaries after a successful birth or death in childbirth was common in the Classical era.

Magical practice is only attested in late antiquity, mainly by identification with Hecate or in invocations with other deities. It was considered a good sign when Artemis appeared in the dreams of hunters and pregnant women, but a naked Artemis was seen as an ill omen.

=== Athens, Brauron and Munichia ===
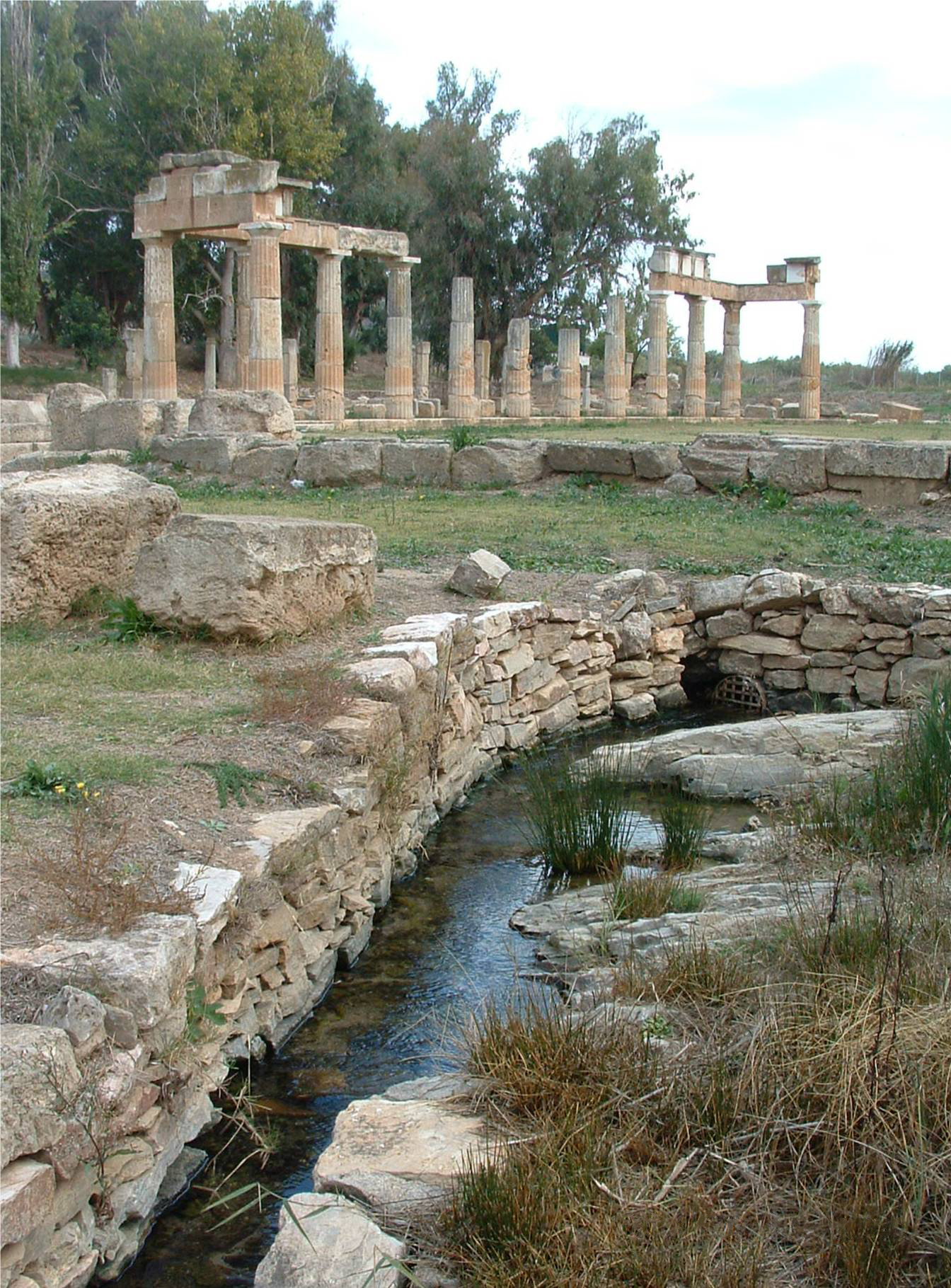
Temple of Artemis at Brauron. The stoa and the sacred spring from the SW.

In Athens, the Elaphebolia festival was celebrated on the sixth day of the ninth Attic month, Elaphebolion. Cakes made from flour, honey, and sesame, including in the shape of stags, were offered to the goddess during the festival, possibly based in an earlier stag hunt. Artemis had a filial cult of Brauronia, near the Acropolis.

According to late literary sources on a joke in Lysistrata, five- to ten-year-old Athenian girls, either selected or a majority, were sent to the sanctuary of Artemis at Brauron to serve the Goddess. They took part in a procession from Athens to Brauron in the Arkteia festival, every four years. During their service, the girls were known as arktoi (bears) and wore saffron tunics. They worked on their weaving and may have competed in athletic games, but the iconography is inconclusive.

Krateriskoi (ceramic vessels), found at Brauron, Munichia and other sites, depict pre-pubescent and older girls in chitons, longer tunics and in the nude, dancing, holding torches or wreaths, or running, in one instance from a bear. This suggests rituals at night, often associated with transitions in life, athletic games or ritual chases. The cult at Brauron had kourotrophic and childbirth-related elements, evident in inventory lists and votive offerings. It was likely closely associated with Iphigenia's hero cult and both received offerings of clothes. However, a full account of the 20th century archaelogical excavations at the site remained unpublished as of 2007. Offerings at Munichia suggest a similar cult.

The festival of Artemis Munichia was celebrated in the Attic harbour town of Piraeus on the 6th or 16th day of the tenth month, Munichion. Young girls were dressed up as bears, as in the Brauronia. Sherd findings at the site suggest cult activity starting in the Geometric period. The festival commemorated the victory of the Greek fleet over the Persians at Salamis.

Most accounts of the cults' etiological myth agree that a bear was killed by young men after harming one or more locals. A plague or famine was sent by Artemis as punishment and in order to placate her, the Athenians had to make young girls "act the bear". It likely was an expiatory ritual to pacify the goddess for the expected loss of virginity and echoes the Kallisto myth. As the Arkteia is referred to as a mysterion and literary sources provide scant additional evidence, even the association of the festivals is uncertain, as are their ties to the archaeological evidence.

In Agrae, a deme of Attica, there was a temple dedicated to Artemis Agrotera. On the 6th day of the month Boedromion, an armed procession would take a large number of goats to this temple, where they would sacrifice in honor of the victory at the Battle of Marathon. The festival was called "Charisteria," also known as the Athenian "Thanksgiving."

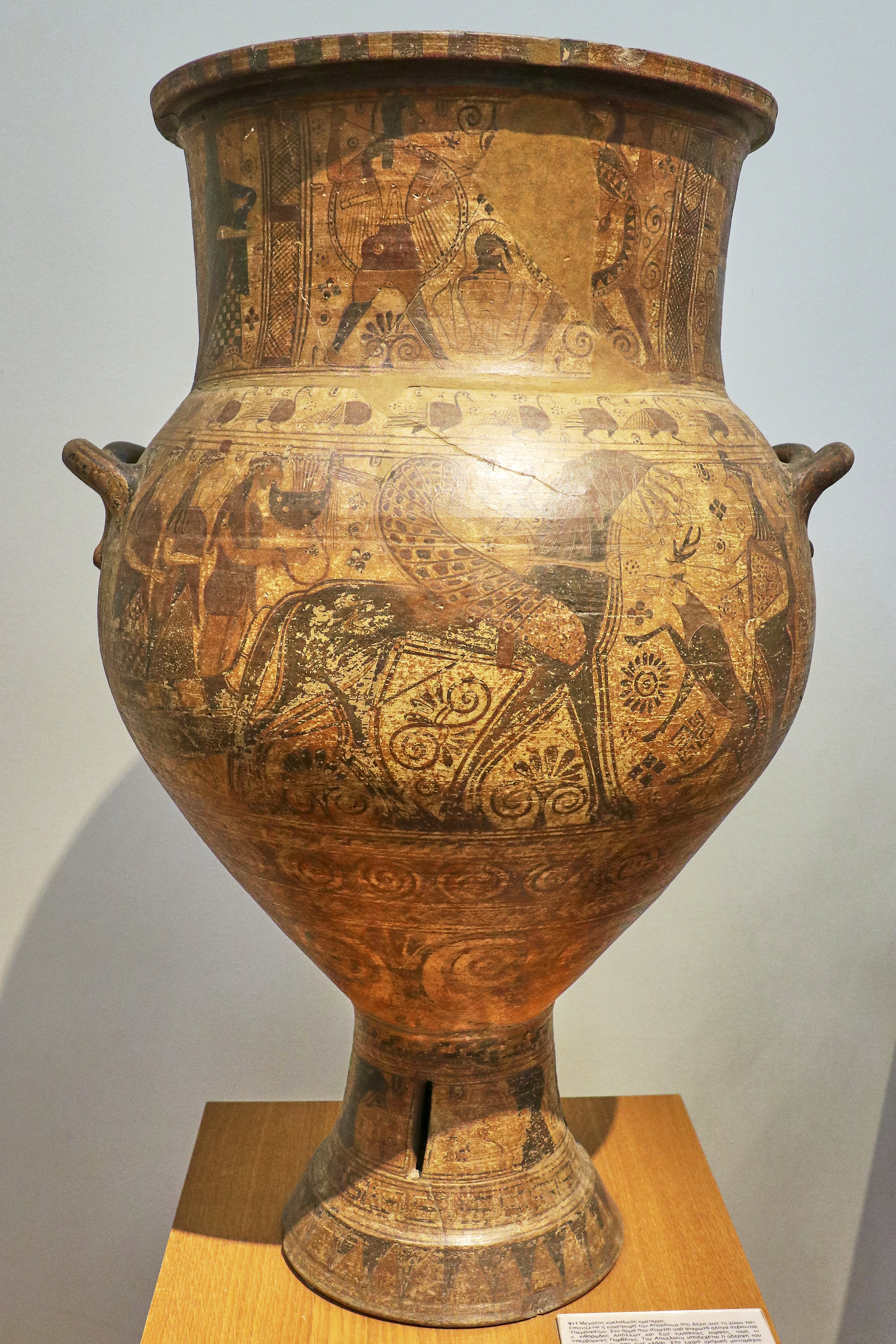
Apollo's return to Delos from Hyperboreans. Artemis holding a deer welcomes Apollo. Cycladic krater (7th cent. BCE) National Archaeological Museum, Athens.

=== Delos ===
A temple to Artemis was built on Delos between 700 and 550 BC on the site of a Mycenean edifice. There she was worshipped in parallel, but not in conjunction with her twin brother Apollo during the archaic period. In the classical age, Artemis was worshipped as part of the Delian Triad with Apollo and her mother Leto, as a goddess of childbirth and midwifery, alongside or identified with Eileithyia and sometimes the Hyperborean maidens.

Artemis could be a deity to be feared by pregnant women, as deaths during this time were attributed to her and common. Golden estimates mortality in the first year of life at 30-40%.. There were numerous other deities associated with it, many localized to a particular geographic area, including but not limited to Aphrodite, Hera and Hekate.

=== Delphi ===
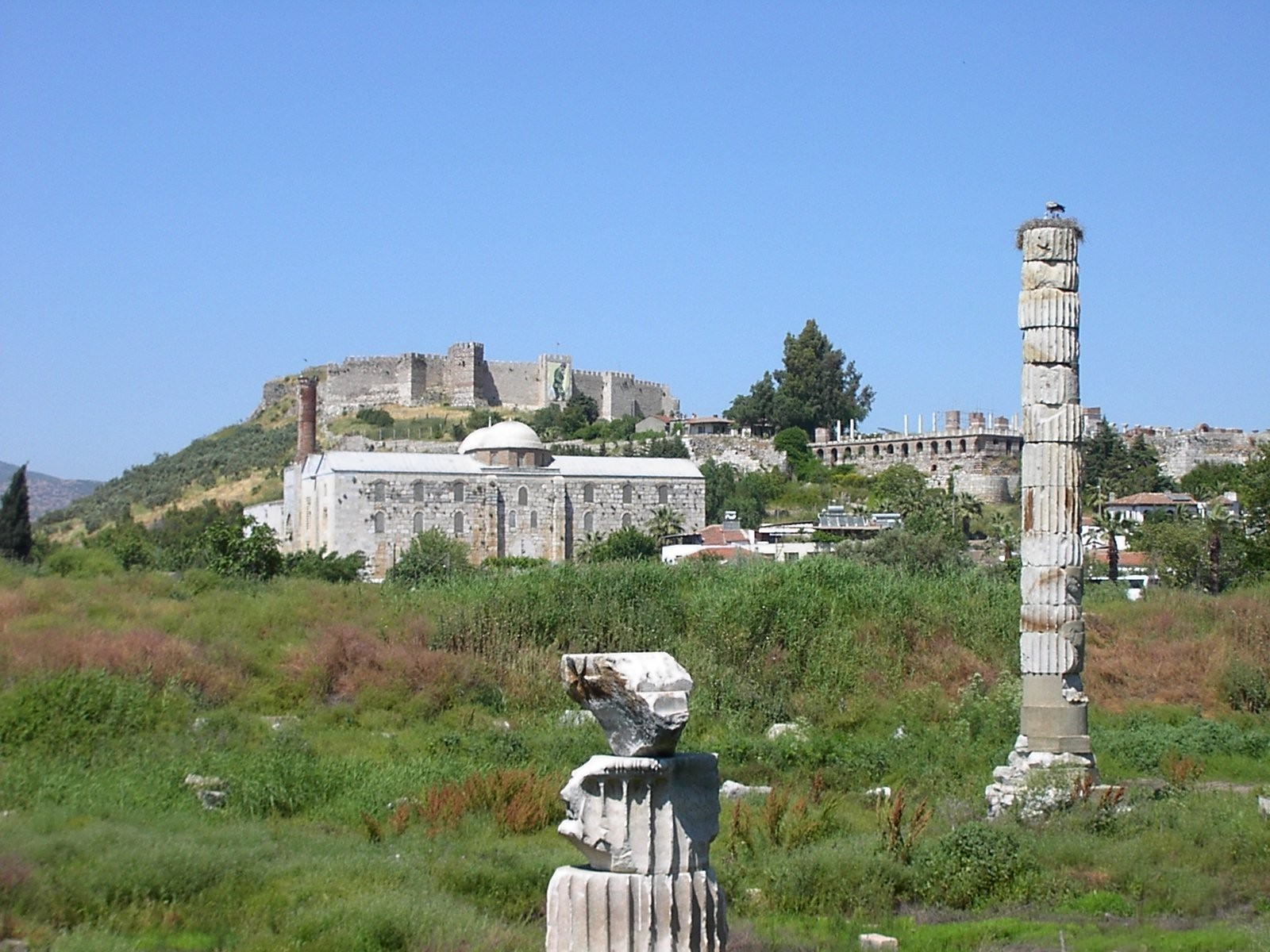
The site of the Temple of Artemis at Ephesus. Its final form was one of the Seven Wonders of the Ancient World.

Despite being primarily known as a goddess of hunting and the wilderness, she was also connected to dancing, music, and song like her brother Apollo; she is often seen singing and dancing with her nymphs, or leading the chorus of the Muses and the Graces at Delphi.

=== Ephesus ===
At Ephesus in Ionia, Turkey, her temple became one of the Seven Wonders of the World. It was probably the best-known center of her worship except for Delos. There, the Lady whom the Ionians associated with Artemis through interpretatio graeca was worshipped primarily as a mother goddess, akin to the Phrygian goddess Cybele, in an ancient sanctuary where her cult image depicted the "Lady of Ephesus" adorned with multiple large beads. Excavation at the site of the Artemision in 1987–88 identified a multitude of tear-shaped amber beads that had been hung on the original wooden statue (xoanon), and these were probably carried over into later sculpted copies.

In Acts of the Apostles, Ephesian metalsmiths who felt threatened by Saint Paul's preaching of Christianity, jealously rioted in her defense, shouting "Great is Artemis of the Ephesians!" Of the 121 columns of her temple, only one composite, made up of fragments, still stands as a marker of the temple's location.

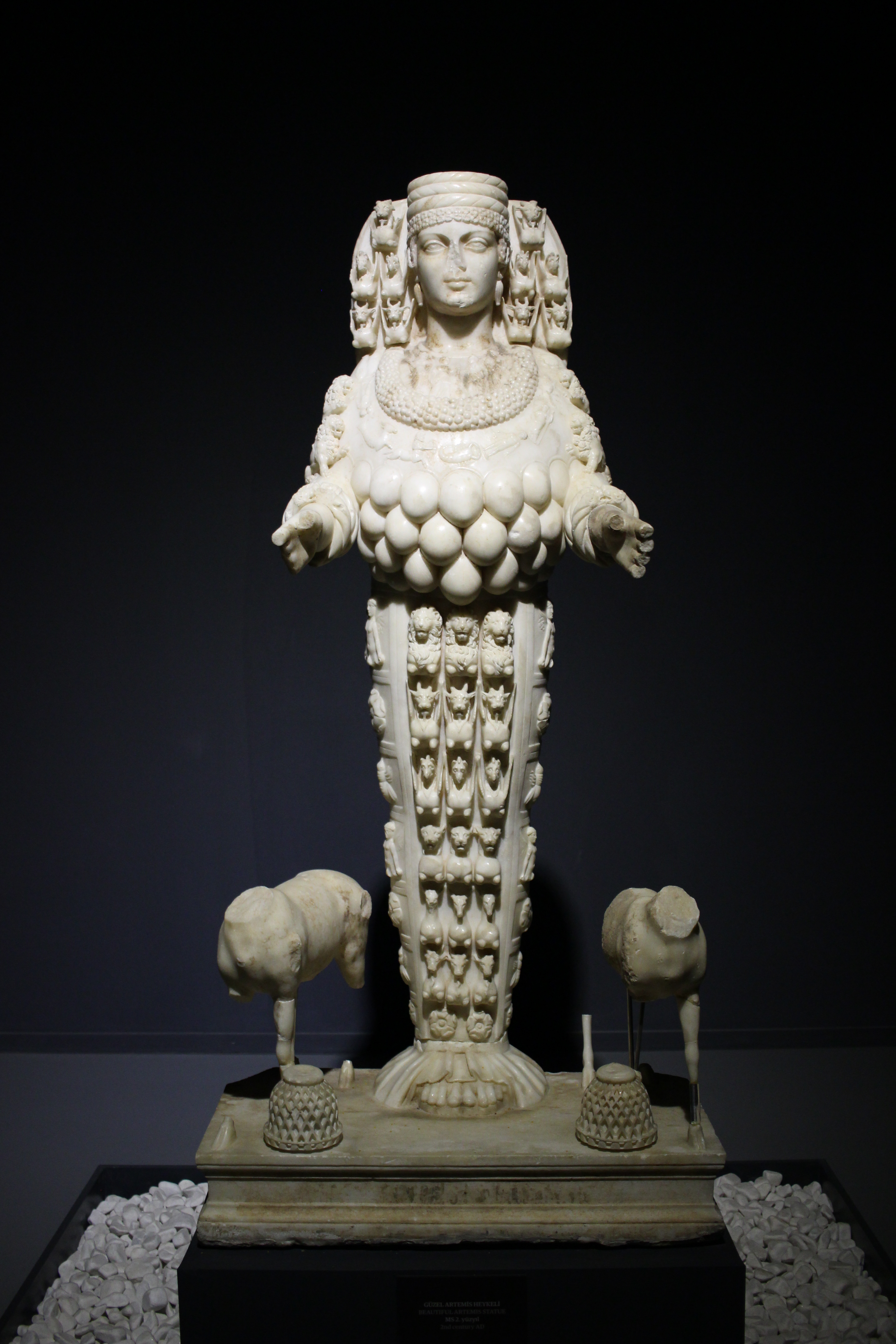
The Artemis of Ephesus, second century CE. Ephesus Archaeological Museum, Izmir, Turkey

At the city of Ephesus in the region of Ionia in Anatolia, the Artemisia festival was celebrated in honour of Artemis. The wealth and splendor of temple and city were taken as evidence of Artemis Ephesia's power. Under Hellenic and Roman rule, the Artemisia festival was increasingly promoted as a key element in the Panhellenic festival circuit. Artemis Ephesia was associated with bees, which appeared on her statue, with her priestesses receiving the name 'Melissa' ('Bee' 'Μέλισσα'), possibly a late Hellenistic addition.

An ancient Greek proverb, written down by Aesop, went "For where did Artemis not dance?", signifying the goddess's connection to dancing and festivity.

=== Laphria ===
At Patras in Achaea, the Laphria festival was celebrated in honour of Artemis. Its characteristic attribute was an annual bonfire, into which domestic and wild animals were thrown alive. It is often considered a prime example of ancient sacrificial rites, traced to old origins in Calydon by Pausanias. However, this account is complicated the unusual full burning of sacrifices, marks of Greco-Roman cult practice, including association with the imperial cult, as well as lack of evidence for the Calydonian cult.

She was previously seen as a clearly Pre-Greek Mistress of Animals, due to the priestess' parade chariot covered in deer skin or drawn by deer, and the unusual sacrifice of live, wild animals, including deers, young wolves and young bears.

At the city of Hyampolis, in the region of Phocis in Central Greece, the Elaphebolia-Laphria festival was held in honour of Artemis. During an attack from the Thessalians, the Phocians gathered their women, children, movable property, clothes, and gold, making a vast pyre. The order was that if they would be defeated, all should be killed and would be thrown into the flames together with their property. The Phocians achieved a great victory and each year they celebrated their victory in the festival. Offerings were burned in an annual fire, recalling the great pyre of the battle. In Delphi in Phocis, the Laphria festival was celebrated in the month of Laphrios. The cult of Artemis Laphria was introduced by the priests of Delphi Lab(r)yaden, who were probably Cretan in origin. At this festival, the priestess followed the parade on a chariot which was covered with the skin of a deer.

At Erineos in Doris, a festival of Artemis Laphria was held, indicated by the month Laphrios in the local calendar.

In Myrrhinus, a deme near Merenda (Markopoulo), there was a cult of Kolainis, who is identified with Artemis Amarysia in Euboia. Some rites and animal sacrifices were probably similar to the rites of Laphria.

Traditionally her cult was introduced from Calydon of Aetolia. The Ionians who lived in Ancient Achaea celebrated the annual festival of Artemis Triclaria. Pausanias mentions the legend of human sacrifices to the outraged goddess. The new deity Dionysus, put an end to the sacrifices.

At Amarynthos in Euboia, the festival of Artemis Amarysia was held. Animals were sacrificed with rites which were probably similar to those in the Laphria festival. In the Boeotian town of Aulis, a festival was held in which various sacrificial animals were offered to the goddess. It seems that the festival was a reverberation of the rites of Laphria. Calydon, in Aetolia, is considered the origin of the cult of Artemis Laphria at Patras. The Aetolian calendar included the month of Laphrios. In Nafpaktos in Aetolia, there was a cult of Artemis Laphria.

=== Orthia (Sparta) ===
The ancient Spartans used to sacrifice to her as one of their patron goddesses before starting a new military campaign. The festival of Artemis Orthia was observed in Sparta. In Sparta, girls of marriageable age performed the partheneia (choral maiden songs) in her honor.

In Sparta, there was a festival in honour of Artemis Orthia, who was associated with the female initiatory rite Partheneion, in which women performed round dances. According to legend, Theseus stole Helene from the dancing floor of Orthia during the round-dancing. The prize of the competitions was an iron sickle (drepanē), indicating that Orthia was a goddess of vegetation. Near Sparta, on the road to Amyklai, where Artemis Korythalia was a goddess of vegetation, women performed lascivious dances in her honour. This festival was celebrated in round huts covered with leaves; the nurses brought the infants to the temple of Korythalia during the Tithenedia festival.

=== Other Cults and Festivals ===
Artemis was born on the sixth day of the month Thargelion (around May), which made it sacred to her. Artemis had many festivals throughout the Greek world, most of which were celebrated during spring.

The most frequent name of a month in the Greek calendars was Artemision in Ionic territories or Artemisios or Artamitios in the Doric and Aeolic territories and in Macedonia. Elaphios is also a month name, in Elis, Elaphebolion in Athens, Iasos, Apollonia of Chalkidice, and Munichion in Attica. In the calendars of Aetolia, Phocis and Gytheion there was a month named Laphrios and in Thebes, Corcyra, and Byzantion the month Eucleios.

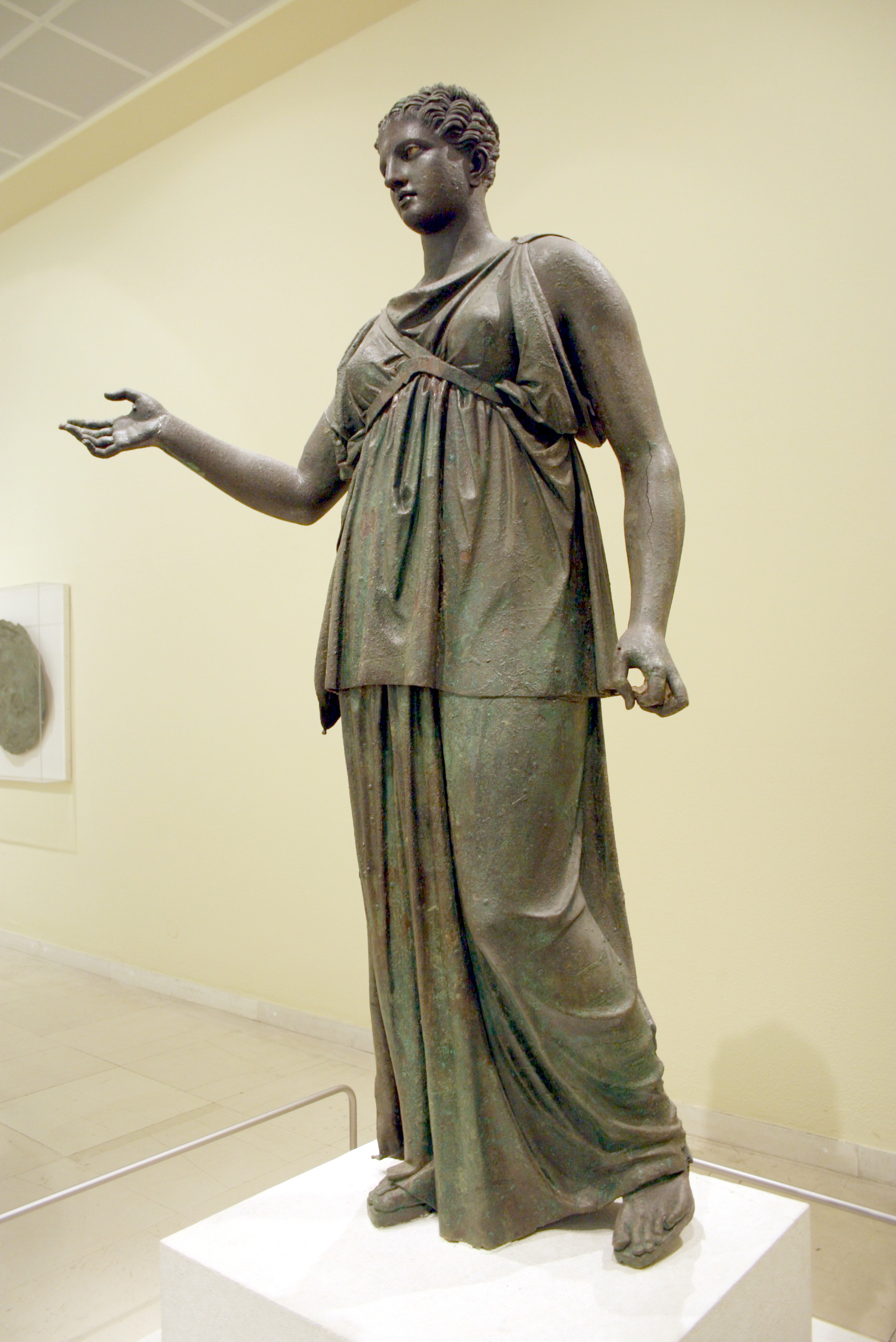
Bronze statue of Artemis (Piraeus Artemis), with a quiver at the back and the pose of the fingers which held a bow. A classicistic work, 4th century BCE attributed to Euphranor. Archaeological Museum of Piraeus.

A deme near Marousi, Athmonia hosted the Amarysia festival, which was no less splendid than the festival of Amarysia in Euboea. Halae Araphenides, a deme near Brauron celebrated the Tauropolia in honour of Artemis Tauropolos, during which a human sacrifice was represented in a ritual. In the deme of Erchia, a festival was celebrated on the 16th day of the month Metageitnion. Sacrifices were offered to Artemis and Hecate.

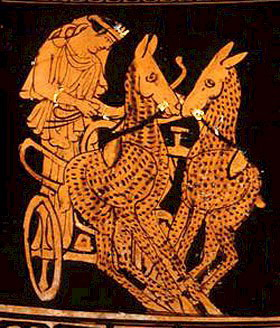
Artemis on her chariot drawn by two hinds. Detail from an Attic red figure crater 460–440 BCE. Attributed to the Painter of the Wooly Satyrs. Louvre, Paris.

The Eucleia festival was also celebrated in honour of Artemis at Delphi. According to the Labyaden inscriptions, the offerings darata are determined by the specified gamela and pedēia.

At the Phocian town of Antikyra, there was a cult of Artemis Diktynaia, a popular goddess worshipped with great respect. In Thebes in Boeotia a preliminary sacrifice to Artemis Eucleia was made before made a marriage, by the bride and the groom. Acarnania included a cult to Artemis Agrotera in a society of hunters. In Aetolia, Artemis Aetole was depicted with a hunting spear or javelin.

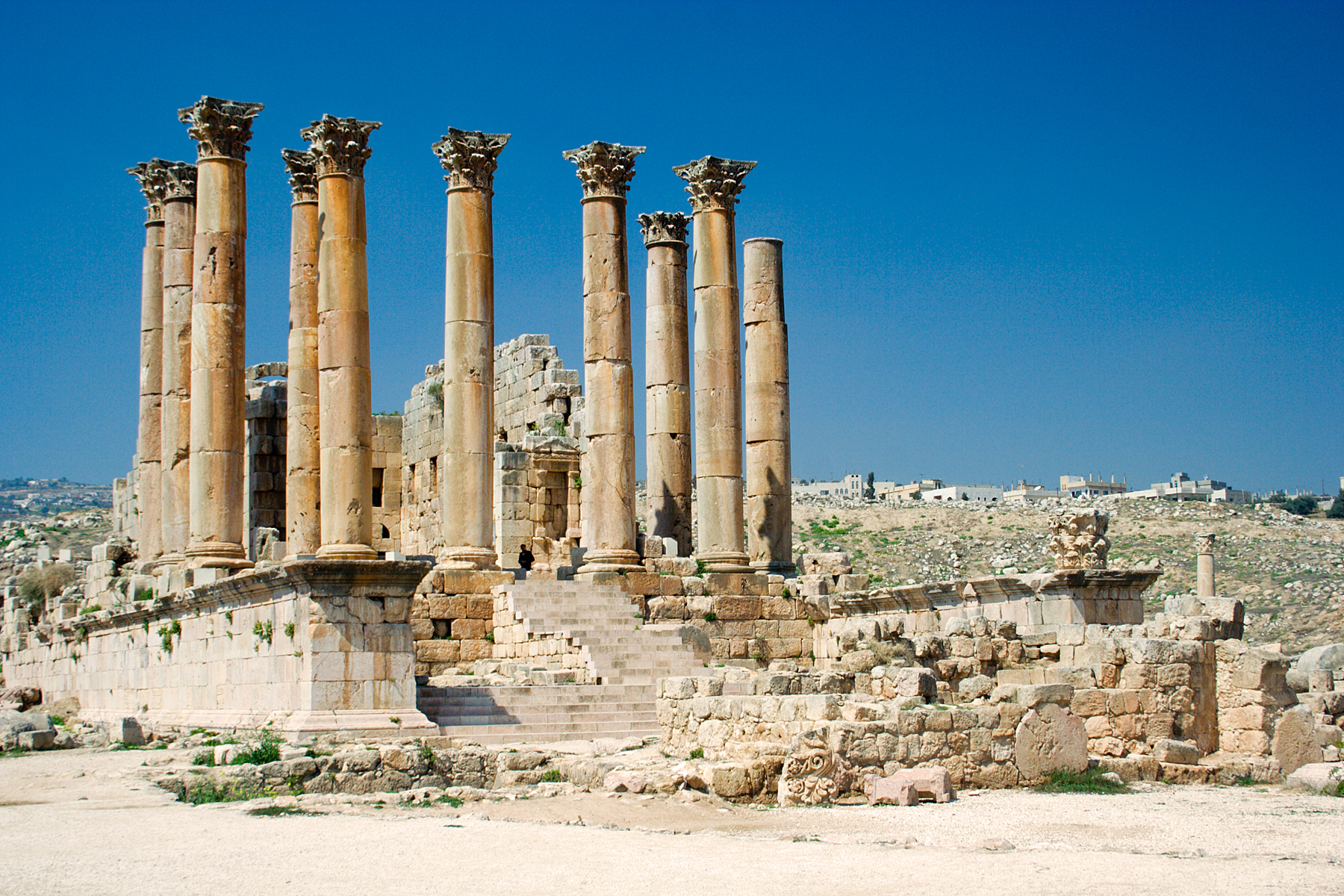
The Roman Temple of Artemis in Jerash, Jordan, built during the reign of Antoninus Pius

In Corinth, the Eucleia festival was celebrated in honor of Artemis. The Achaean town of Aigeira held a festival to Artemis Agrotera (huntress). When the Sicyonians attacked the city, the Aigeirians tied torches on all of the goats in the area and set them alight during the night. The Sicyonians, believing Aigeira had a great army, retreated.

At Messene, a festival of Artemis Limnatis ('of the lake') was celebrated with cymbals and dances. The goddess was worshipped by young women during the festivals of transition from childhood to adulthood. At the Laconian town of Dereion, there was a cult of Artemis Dereatis. A festival there was celebrated with hymns known as calavoutoi and with an obscene dance, callabis. There was also a cult of Artemis Limnatis at the town of Epidauros Limera. Caryae, along the border between Laconia and Arcadia, celebrated a festival of Artemis Caryatis, a goddess of vegetation related to tree cult; each year, women performed an ecstatic dance called the caryatis. At Boiai, there was a cult of Artemis Soteira (savior), which was related to the myrtle tree. When the inhabitants of the cities near the gulf were expelled, Artemis took the shape of a hare and guided them to a myrtle tree where they built the new city. At the Laconian town of Gytheion, there was a cult of Artemis Laphria.

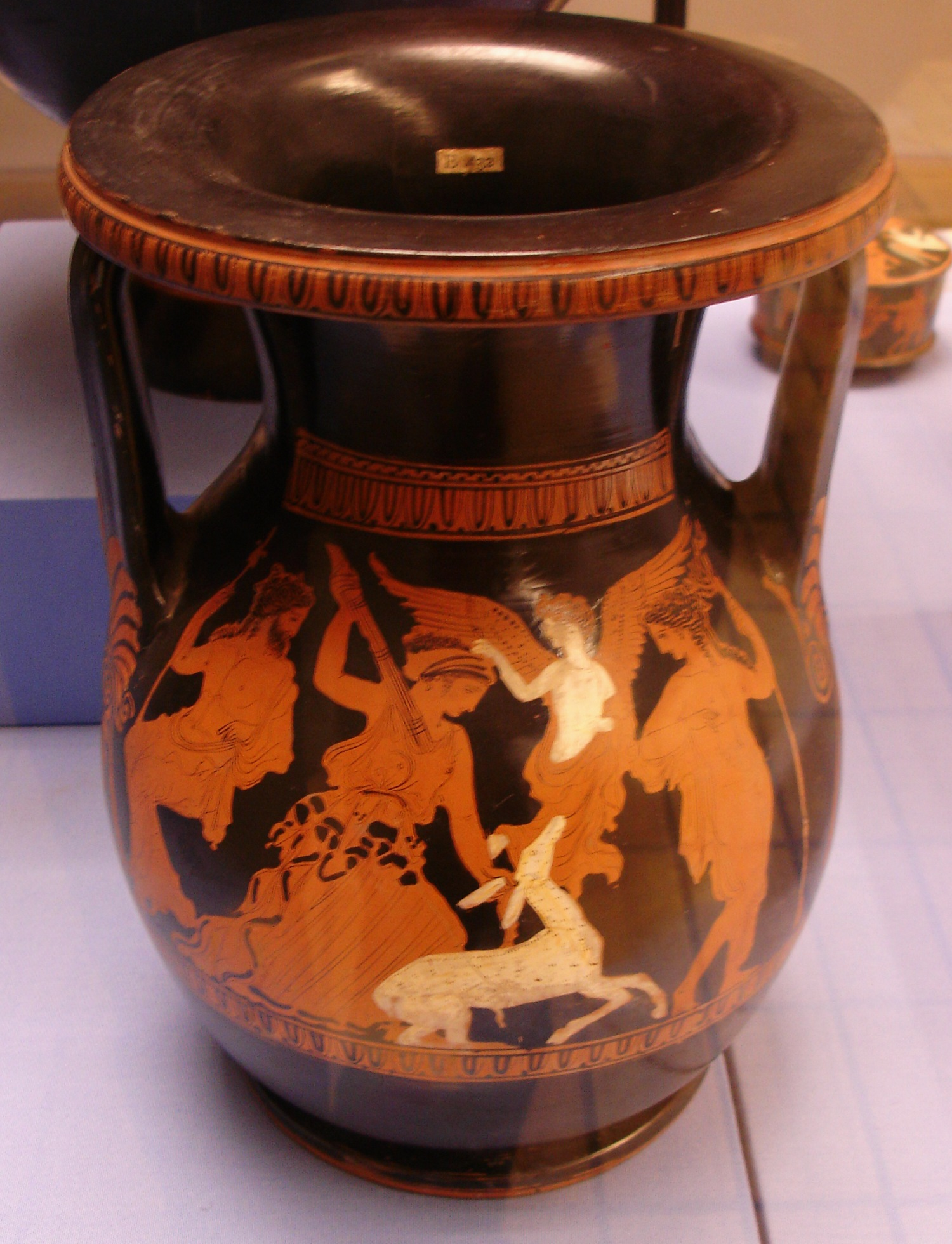
Artemis hunting a stag, surrounded by Zeus (left), Nikê (top) and Apollo (right). The goddess is wielding a torch. Attic red-figured pelike 370–350 BCE. From Campania, South Italy. British Museum, London

In Elis, a festival of Artemis Elaphia (a goddess of hunting) was held in the month Elaphios. In Elis, the hero Pelops was thought to win the sovereignty of Pisa, and his followers celebrated their victory near the temple of Artemis Kordaka, performing a dance called kordax. In the town Letrinoi in Elis, there was a festival which celebrated Artemis Alpheaia, which girls, wearing masks, performed dances. At Olympia, an annual festival was held in honour of Artemis Alpheaia, as was one to Artemis Daphnaia ('of the laurel-branch'), a goddess of vegetation.

At Hypsus in Arcadia, there was an annual festival to Artemis Diktynna, who had a temple near the sea. It was also the site of an annual festival in honour of Artemis Daphnaia. In Stymphalus, there was a festival of Artemis Stymphalia, which begun near the Katavothres where the water overflowed, creating a big marsh. At Orchomenus, a sanctuary was built for Artemis Hymnia in which her festival was celebrated every year. There was a cult to Artemis Limnatis in Tegea. After expelling their Spartan conquerors and recovering their city, the Phigalians built a sanctuary and statue of Artemis Soteira (Savior) on the summit of the city's Acropolis. At the beginning of festivals, all of their processions started from this sanctuary. At Troizen in Argolis, there was a festival to Artemis Saronia.

At Aegae in Macedonia, Eucleia had a shrine in the city's agora; this goddess is associated with Artemis Eucleia, the goddess of marriage who was widely worshipped in Boeotia. In Apollonia in Chalcidice, the Elaphebolia festival was celebrated in honour of Artemis in the month of Elaphebolion.

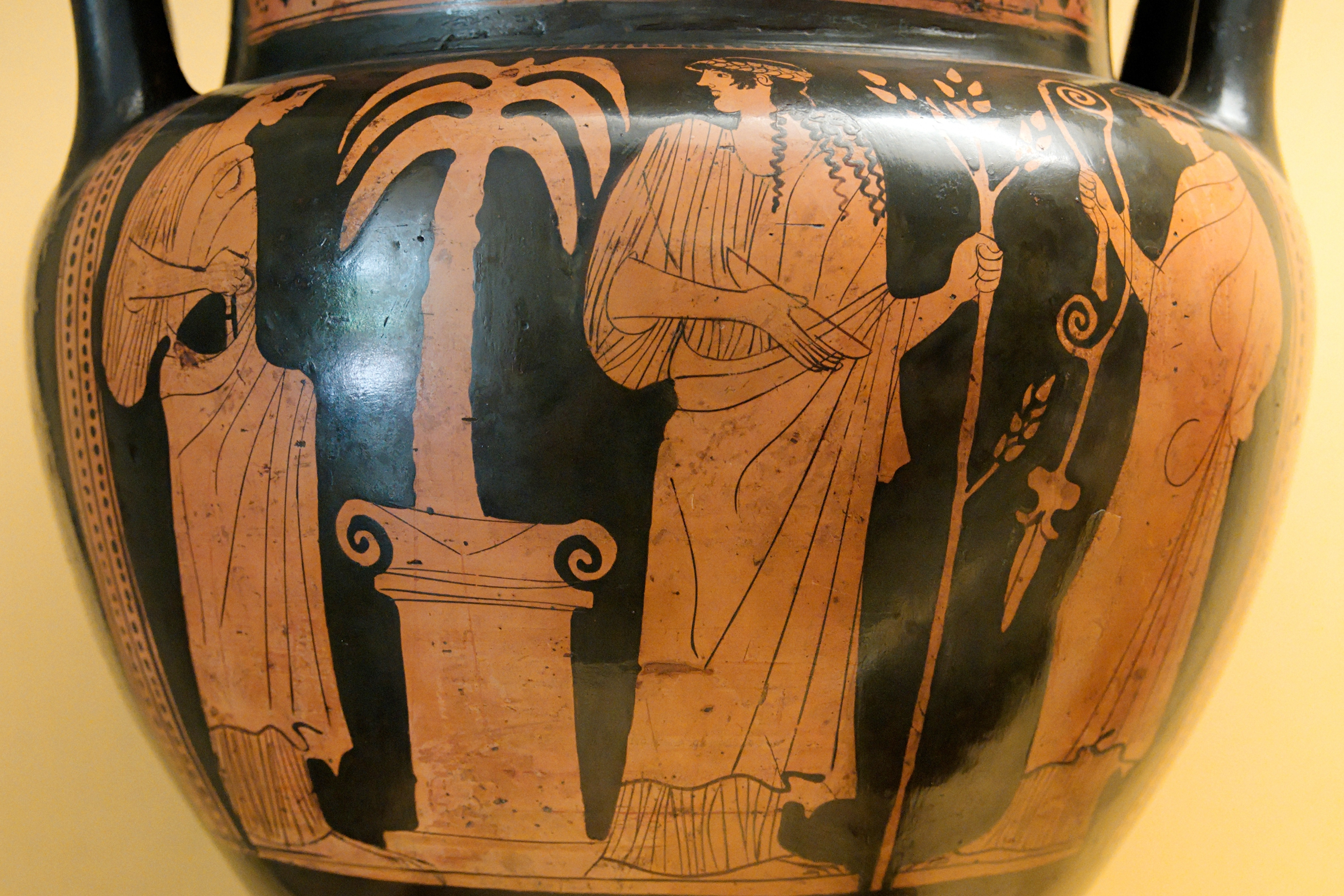
From left to right: Artemis holding an oinochoe, Apollo holding a laurel branch and a phiale, about to pour a libation on the altar. Attic red-figure column-krater 450 BCE. National Archaeological Museum (Madrid)

On the island of Icaria, the Tauropolion, a temple to Artemis Tauropolos, was built at Oinoe. Another, smaller temenos sacred to Artemis Tauropolos was located on the island's coast. On the island of Cephalonia, there was a cult of Artemis Laphria. On Corcyra, there was a cult in honour of Artemis Laphria.

At Perga in Ionia, there was a famous festival of Artemis Pergaia; under Roman rule, Diana-Pergaia was identified with Selene. At Iasos in Caria, the Elaphebolia festival was celebrated in honor of Artemis in the month of Elaphebolion At Byzantion, there was a festival of Artemis Eucleia in the month of Eucleios.

At Syracuse, located on the island of Sicily, the festival of Artemis Chitonia was celebrated, and included a dance and flute music. Chitonia (wearing a loose tunic) was a goddess of hunting. The city also held a festival to Artemis Lyaia, in which men came from the countryside to the city in a rustic dress. They carried a deer's antlers on their head and held a shepherd's stab, and sang satirical songs while drinking wine; the festival linked comic performance and the countryside. At Tauromenion in Sicily, there was a festival held in honour of Artemis Eucleia in the month of Eucleios. The festival of Artemis Korythalia included male dancers who wore wooden masks.

There was a women's cult at Cyzicus worshiping Artemis, which was called Dolon (Δόλων).

== Attributes ==
=== Virginity ===
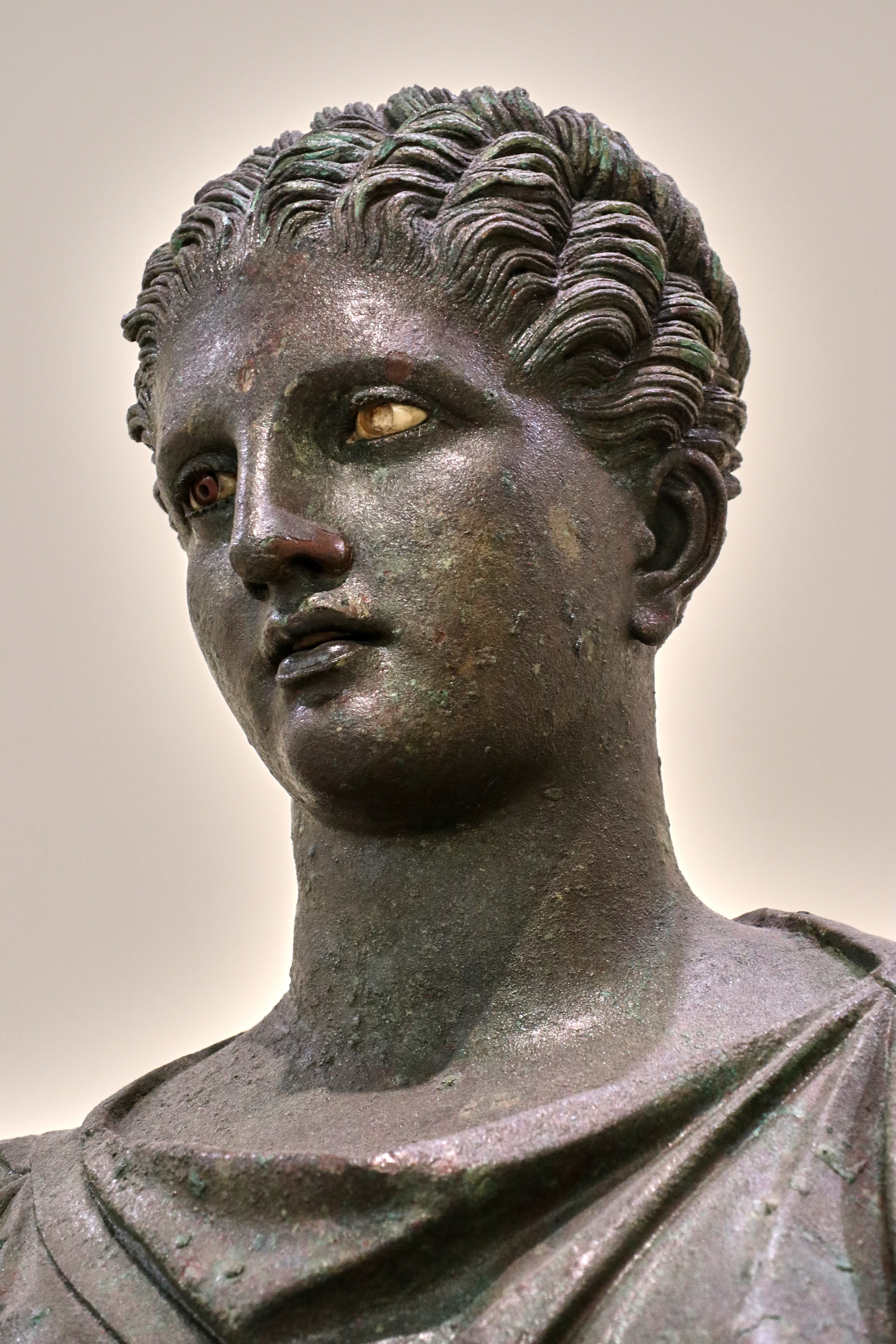
This bronze statue of Artemis in the Archaeological Museum of Piraeus (Athens) dates from the mid-fourth century BCE and was given to sculptor Euphranor.

An important aspect of Artemis's persona and worship was her virginity, which may seem contradictory, given her role as a goddess associated with childbirth. The idea of Artemis as a virgin goddess likely is related to her primary role as a huntress. Hunters traditionally abstained from sex prior to the hunt as a form of ritual purity and out of a belief that the scent would scare off potential prey. The ancient cultural context in which Artemis's worship emerged also held that virginity was a prerequisite to marriage, and that a married woman became subservient to her husband.

In this light, Artemis's virginity is also related to her power and independence. Rather than a form of asexuality, it is an attribute that signals Artemis as her own master, with power equal to that of male gods. Her virginity also possibly represents a concentration of fertility that can be spread among her followers, in the manner of earlier mother-goddess figures. However, some later Greek writers did come to treat Artemis as inherently asexual and as an opposite to Aphrodite.

=== As a mother goddess ===
Despite her virginity, both modern scholars and ancient commentaries have linked Artemis to the archetype of the mother goddess. Artemis was traditionally linked to fertility and was petitioned to assist women with childbirth. According to Herodotus, Greek playwright Aeschylus identified Artemis with Persephone as a daughter of Demeter. Her worshipers in Arcadia also traditionally associated her with Demeter and Persephone. In Asia Minor, she was often conflated with local mother-goddess figures, such as Cybele, and Anahita in Iran.

The archetype of the mother goddess, though, was not highly compatible with the Greek pantheon, and though the Greeks had adopted the worship of Cybele and other Anatolian mother goddesses as early as the seventh century BCE, she was not directly conflated with any Greek goddesses. Instead, bits and pieces of her worship and aspects were absorbed variously by Artemis, Aphrodite, and others as Eastern influence spread.

=== As a lunar deity ===
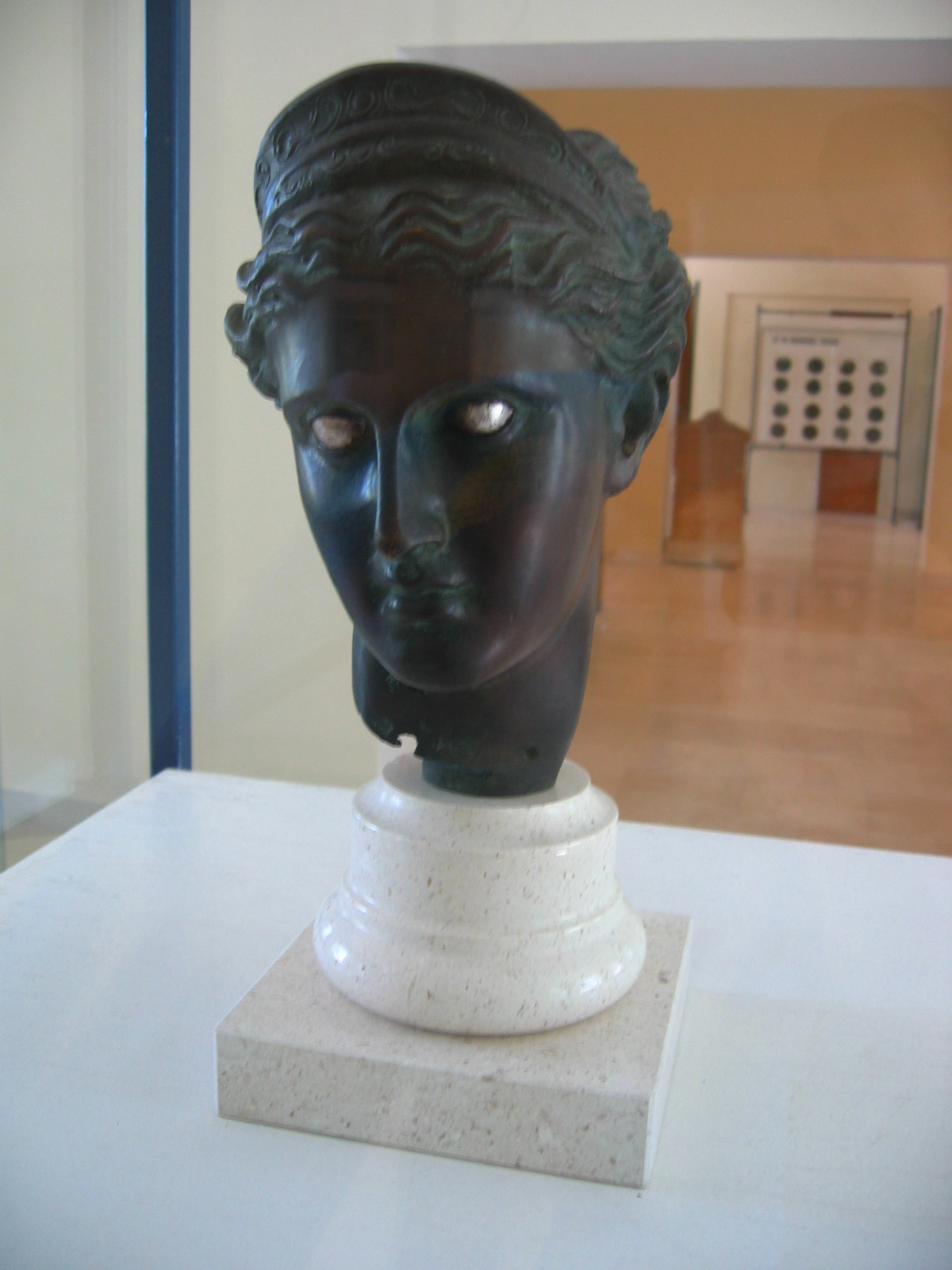
Praxitelean bronze head of a goddess (probably Artemis), wearing a lunate crown, 4th century BCE. Found at Issa, Vis, Croatia).

No records have been found of the Greeks referring to Artemis as a lunar deity, as their lunar deity was Selene, but the Romans identified Artemis with Selene, leading them to perceive her as a lunar deity. As the Romans began to associate Apollo more with Helios, the personification of the Sun, it was only natural that the Romans would then begin to identify Apollo's twin sister, Artemis, with Helios's own sister, Selene, the personification of the Moon.

Evidence of the syncretism of Artemis and Selene is found early on; a scholium on the Iliad, claiming to be reporting sixth century BCE author Theagenes's interpretation of the theomachy in Book 21, says that in the fight between Artemis and Hera, Artemis represents the Moon, while Hera represents the earthly air.

Active references to Artemis as an illuminating goddess start much later. Notably, Roman-era author Plutarch writes how during the Battle of Salamis, Artemis led the Athenians to victory by shining with the full moon, but all lunar-related narratives of this event come from Roman times, and none of the contemporary writers (such as Herodotus) makes any mention of the night or the Moon.

Artemis's connection to childbed and women's labour naturally led to her becoming associated with the menstrual cycle in course of time, thus the Moon. Selene, just like Artemis, was linked to childbirth, as it was believed that women had the easiest labours during the full moon, paving thus the way for the two goddesses to be seen as the same. On that, Cicero writes:

Apollo, a Greek name, is called Sol, the sun; and Diana, Luna, the moon. [...] Luna, the moon, is so called a lucendo (from shining); she bears the name also of Lucina: and as in Greece the women in labor invoke Diana Lucifera,

An association with health was another reason for Artemis and Selene's syncretization; Strabo wrote that Apollo and Artemis were connected to the Sun and the Moon, respectively, owing to the changes the two celestial bodies caused to the temperature of the air, as the two gods presided over pestilential diseases and sudden deaths.

Roman authors applied Artemis/Diana's byname, "Phoebe", to Luna/Selene, the same way as "Phoebus" was given to Helios due to his identification with Apollo. Another epithet of Artemis that Selene appropriated is "Cynthia", meaning "born in Mount Cynthus." The goddesses Artemis, Selene, and Hecate formed a triad, identified as the same goddess with three avatars: Selene in the sky (moon), Artemis on earth (hunting), and Hecate beneath the earth (Underworld).

In Italy, those three goddesses became a ubiquitous feature in depictions of sacred groves, where Hecate/Trivia marked intersections and crossroads along with other liminal deities. The Romans enthusiastically celebrated the multiple identities of Diana as Hecate, Luna, and Trivia.

Roman poet Horace in his odes enjoins Apollo to listen to the prayers of the boys, as he asks Luna, the "two-horned queen of the stars", to listen to those of the girls in place of Diana, due to their role as protectors of the young. In Virgil's Aeneid, when Nisus addresses Luna/the Moon, he calls her "daughter of Latona."

In works of art, the two goddesses were mostly distinguished; Selene is usually depicted as being shorter than Artemis, with a rounder face, and wearing a long robe instead of a short hunting chiton, with a billowing cloak forming an arc above her head. Artemis was sometimes depicted with a lunate crown.

=== As Hecate ===
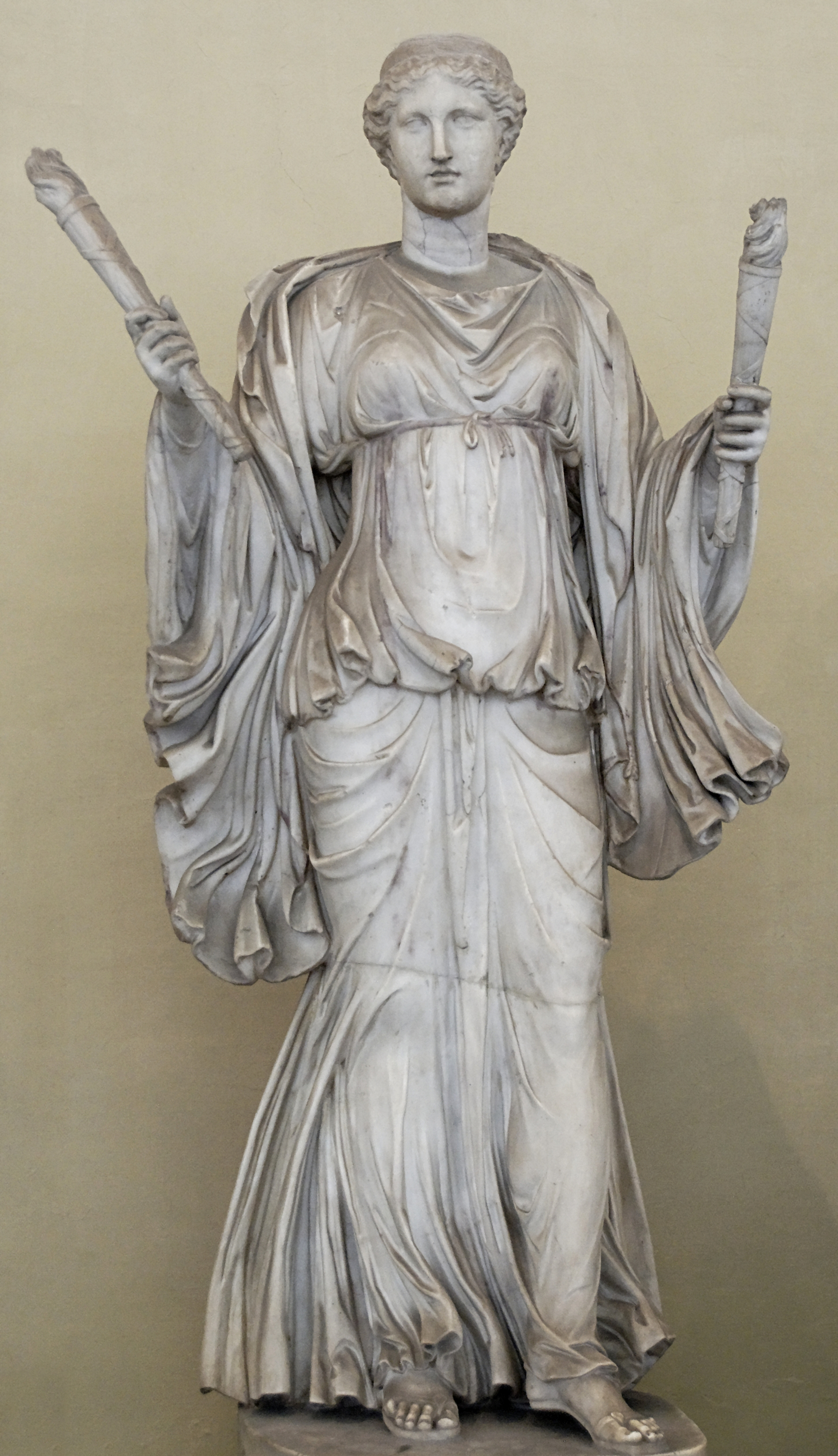
Artemis holding torches. Marble, Roman copy of the 2nd century CE after a Greek original of the 4th century BCE. Museo Chiaramonti, Vatican Museums

Some scholars believe that Hecate was an aspect of Artemis prior to the latter's adoption into the Olympian pantheon. Artemis would have, at that point, become more strongly associated with purity and maidenhood on the one hand, while her originally darker attributes like her association with magic, the souls of the dead, and the night would have continued to be worshipped separately under her title Hecate.

Both goddesses carried torches, and were accompanied by a dog. It seems that the character of Artemis in Arcadia was original. At Acacaesium Artemis Hegemone is depicted holding two torches, and at Lycosura Artemis is depicted holding a snake and a torch. A bitch suitable for hunting was lying down by her side.

Sophocles calles Artemis Amphipyros, carrying a torch in each hand, however the adjective refers also to the twin fire on the two peaks of the mountain Parnassus behind Delphi. In the fest of Laphria at Delphi Artemis is related to the Pre-Greek mistress of the animals, with barbaric sacrifices and possible connections with magic and ghosts since Potnia Theron was close to the daimons. The annual fire was the characteristique custom of the fest.

At Kerameikos in Athens Artemis is clearly identified with Hecate. Pausanias believes that Kalliste (the most beautiful) is a surname of Artemis carrying a torch. In Thessaly the distinctly local goddess Enodia with the surname Pheraia is identified with Hecate. Artemis Pheraia was worshipped in Argos, Athens and Sicyon.

=== Symbols ===
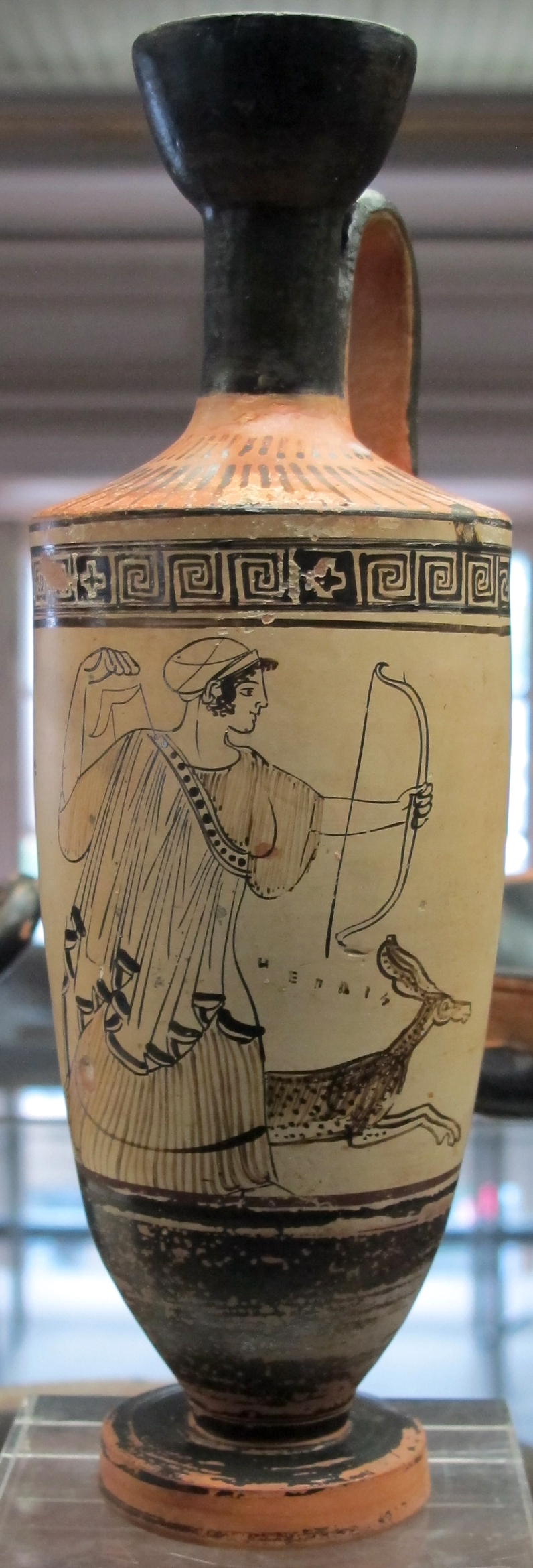
Artemis with a bow and a deer. Attic lekythos 460–450 BCE

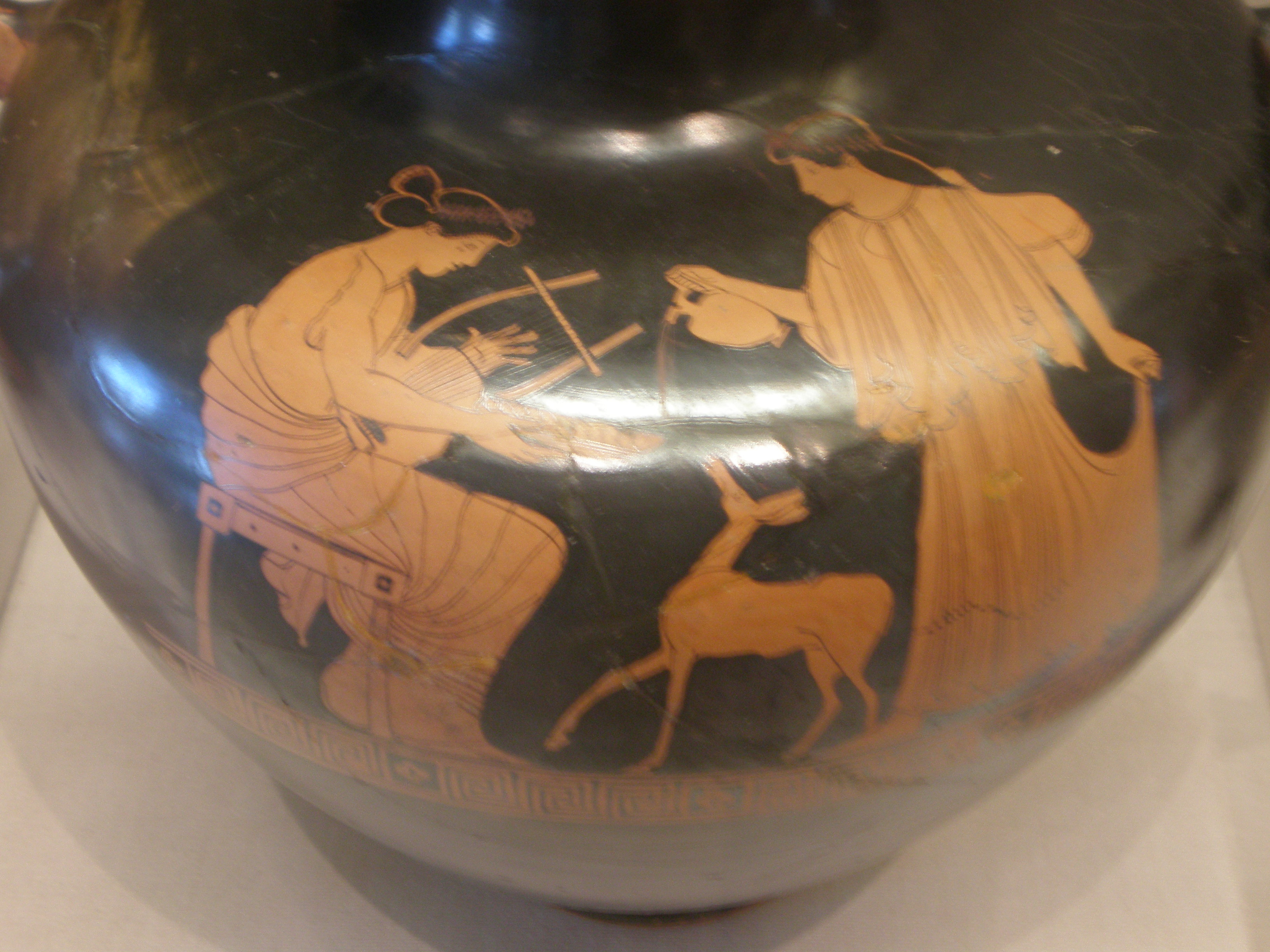
Detail of an Attic red-figure hydria depicting Apollo and Artemis. 480–450 BCE by the Pan Painter. Legion of Honor (museum), San Francisco.

==== Deer ====
Deer were the only animals held sacred to Artemis herself. On seeing a deer larger than a bull with horns shining, she fell in love with these creatures and held them sacred. Deer were also the first animals she captured. She caught four golden-horned deer and harnessed them to her chariot. At Lycosura in isolated Arcadia Artemis is depicted holding a snake and a torch and dressed with a deer skin, besides Demeter and Persephone. It seems that the depictions of Artemis and Demeter-Melaina (black) in Arcadia correspond to the earliest conceptions of the first Greeks in Greece. At the fest of Laphria at Delphi the priestess followed the parade on a chariot which was covered with the skin of a deer. The third labour of Heracles, commanded by Eurystheus, consisted of chasing and catching the terrible Ceryneian Hind. The hind was a female deer with golden antlers and hooves of bronze and was sacred to Artemis. Heracles begged Artemis for forgiveness and promised to return it alive. Artemis forgave him, but targeted Eurystheus for her wrath.

==== Hunting dog ====
In a legend Artemis got her hunting dogs from Pan in the forest of Arcadia. Pan gave Artemis two black-and-white dogs, three reddish ones, and one spotted one – these dogs were able to hunt even lions. Pan also gave Artemis seven bitches of the finest Arcadian race, but Artemis only ever brought seven dogs hunting with her at any one time. In the earliest conceptions of Artemis at Lycosura, a bitch suitable for hunting was lying down by her side.

==== Bear ====
In a Pre-Greek cult Artemis was conceived as a bear. Kallisto was transformed into a bear, and she is a hypostasis of Artemis with a theriomorph form. In the cults of Artemis at Brauron and at Piraeus Munichia (arkteia) young virgin girls were disguised as bears (arktoi) in a ritual and they served the goddess before marriage.

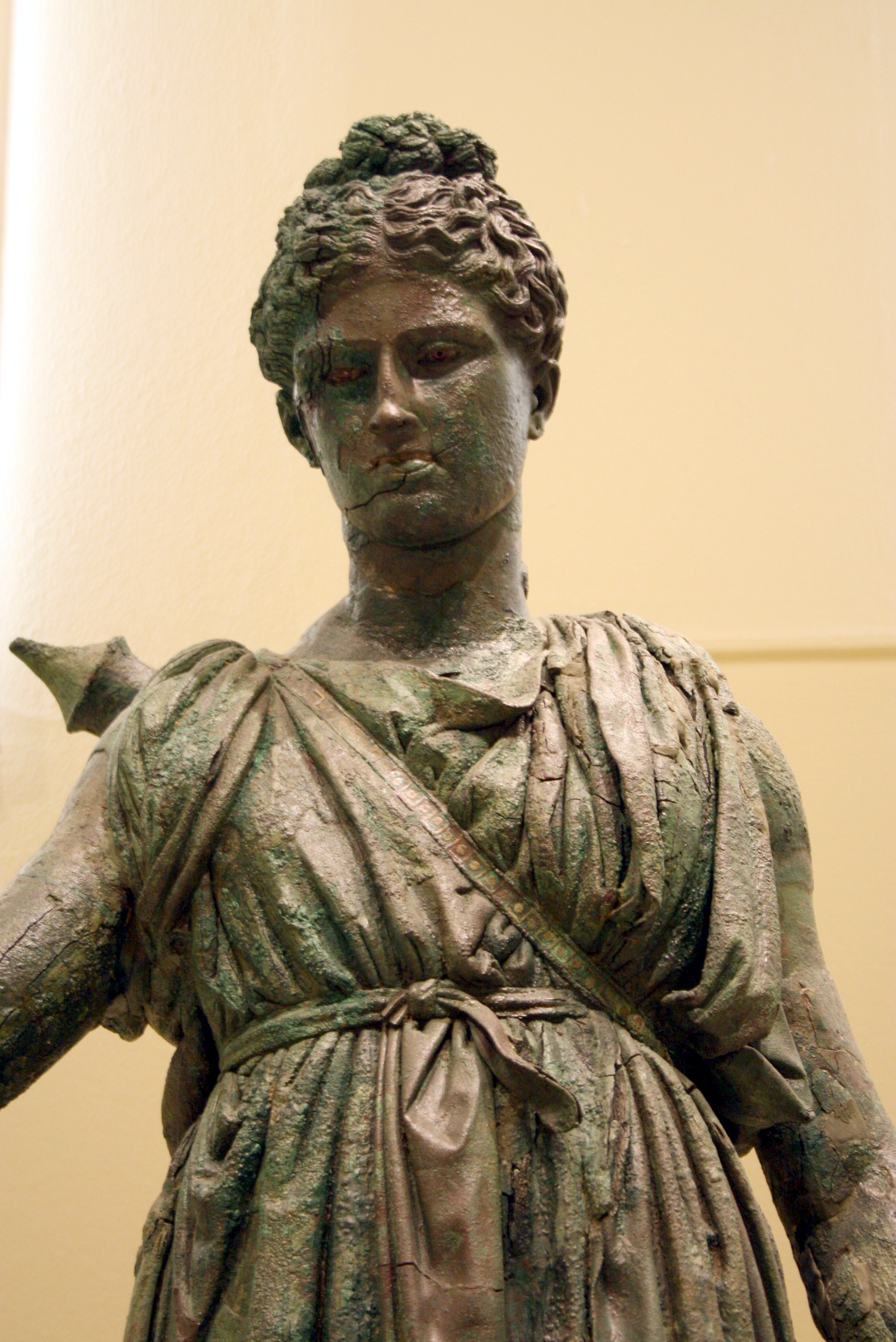
The small Piraeus Artemis, bronze statue of the 4th century

An etiological myth tries to explain the origin of the Arkteia. Every year, a girl between five and ten years of age was sent to Artemis's temple at Brauron. A bear was tamed by Artemis and introduced to the people of Athens. They touched it and played with it until one day a group of girls poked the bear until it attacked them. A brother of one of the girls killed the bear, so Artemis sent a plague in revenge. The Athenians consulted an oracle to understand how to end the plague. The oracle suggested that, in payment for the bear's blood, no Athenian virgin should be allowed to marry until she had served Artemis in her temple (played the bear for the goddess).

In a legend of the cult of Munichia if someone killed a bear, then they were to be punished by sacrificing their daughter in the sanctuary. Embaros disguised his daughter dressing her like a bear (arktos), and hid her in the adyton. He placed a goat on the altar and he sacrificed the goat instead of his daughter.

==== Boar ====
The boar is one of the favorite animals of the hunters, and also hard to tame. In honor of Artemis's skill, they sacrificed it to her. Oeneus and Adonis were both killed by Artemis's boar. In The Odyssey, she descends from a peak and she travels along the ridges of Mount Erymanthos, that was sacred to the "Mistress of the animals". When the goddess became wrathful she would send the terrible Erymanthian boar to laid waste the farmer's fields. Heracles managed to kill the terrible creature during his Twelve Labors.

In one legend, the Calydonian boar had terrorized the territory of Calydon because Artemis (the mistress of the animals) was offended. The Calydonian boar hunt is one of the great heroic adventures in Greek legend. The most famous Greek heroes including Meleager and Atalanta took part in the expedition. The fierce-hunter virgin Atalanta allied to the goddess Artemis was the first who wounded the Calydonian boar.

==== Bull ====
Artemis is sometimes identified with the mythical bull-goddess in a cult foreign in Greece. The cult can be identified in Halae Araphenides in Attica. At the end of the peculiar fest the sacrifice of a man was represented in a ritual.

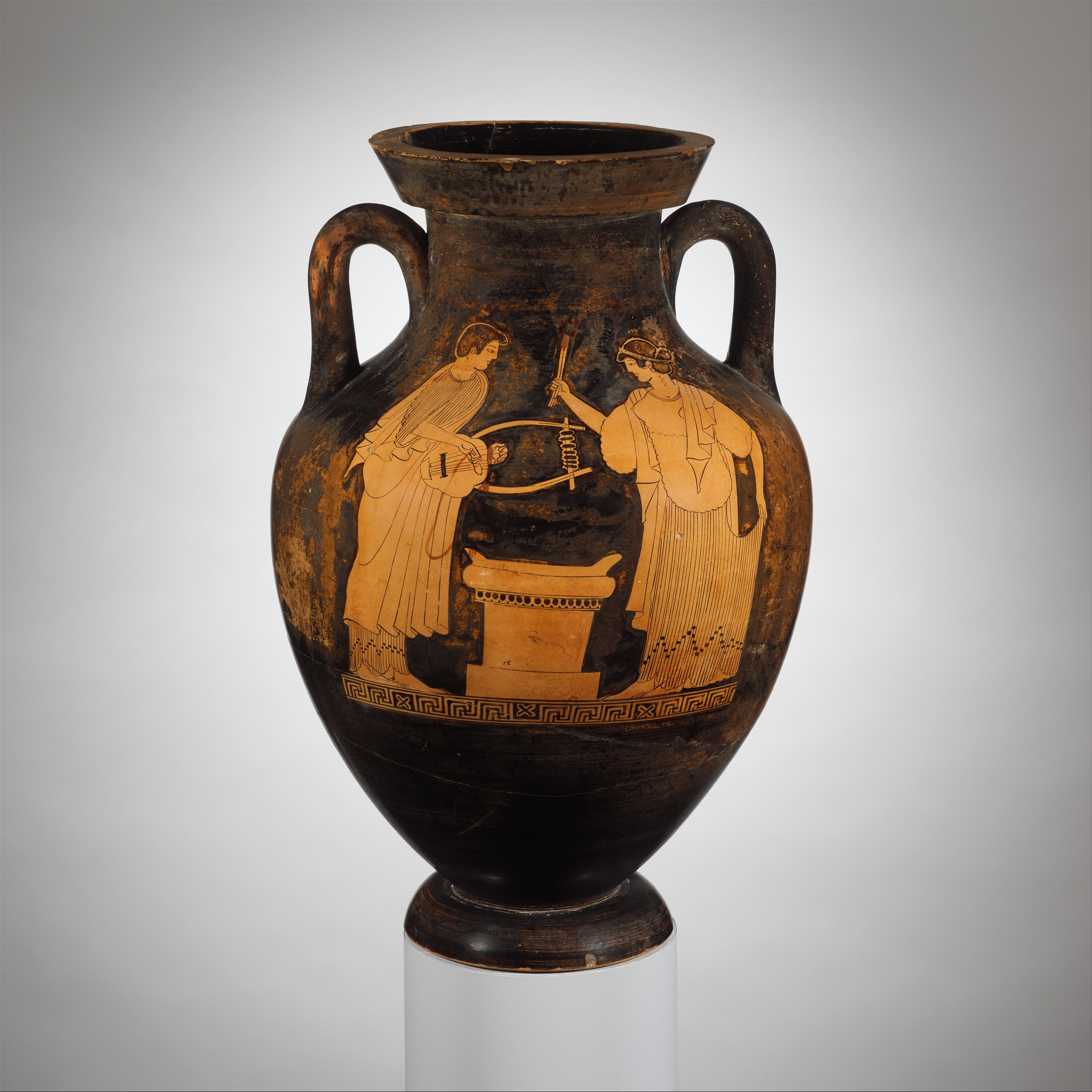
Apollo (left) and Artemis (right) carrying a torch and flanking an altar. Terracotta amphora (jar) 490 BCE. Metropolitan Museum of Art. Manhattan, New York

==== Torch ====
Artemis is often depicted holding one or two torches. At Acacaesium, Artemis Hegemone ('the leader') is portrayed holding two torches. At Lycosura, she is shown holding a snake and a torch, with a bitch suitable for hunting lying by her side. Sophocles calls Artemis "Elaphebolos, (deer slayer) Amphipyros (with a fire in each end)", recalling the annual fire of the Delphic Laphria festival; the adjective refers also to the twin fires of the two peaks of the Mount Parnassus above Delphi (Phaedriades). On a relief from Sicily, the goddess is depicted holding a torch in one hand and an offering on the other; the torch was used for the ignition of the altar's fire.

== Archaic and classical art ==
During the Bronze Age, the "mistress of the animals" is usually depicted between two lions with a peculiar crown on her head. The oldest representations of Artemis in Greek Archaic art, circa 550 BCE, portray her as Potnia Theron ("Queen of the Beasts"): a winged goddess holding a stag and lioness in her hands, or sometimes a lioness and a lion. Potnia theron is the only Greek goddess close to the daimons and sometimes is depicted with a Gorgon head, and the Gorgon is her distant ancestor. This winged Artemis lingered in ex-votos as Artemis Orthia, with a sanctuary close by Sparta.

In Greek classical art she is usually portrayed as a maiden huntress, young, tall, and slim, clothed in a girl's short skirt, with hunting boots, a quiver, a golden or silver bow and arrows.

Often, she is shown in the shooting pose, and is accompanied by a hunting dog or stag. When portrayed as a lunar deity, Artemis wore a long robe and sometimes a veil covered her head. Her darker side is revealed in some vase paintings, where she is shown as the death-bringing goddess whose arrows fell young maidens and women, such as the daughters of Niobe.

As a goddess of maiden dances and songs, Artemis is often portrayed with a lyre in ancient art. She is sometimes depicted with a fishing spear, in connection with her cult as a patron goddess of fishing. Artemis was sometimes represented in Classical art with the crown of the crescent moon, such as also found on Luna and others.

On June 7, 2007, a Roman-era bronze sculpture of Artemis and the Stag was sold at Sotheby's auction house in New York state by the Albright-Knox Art Gallery for $25.5 million.

== Gallery ==
Ancient art

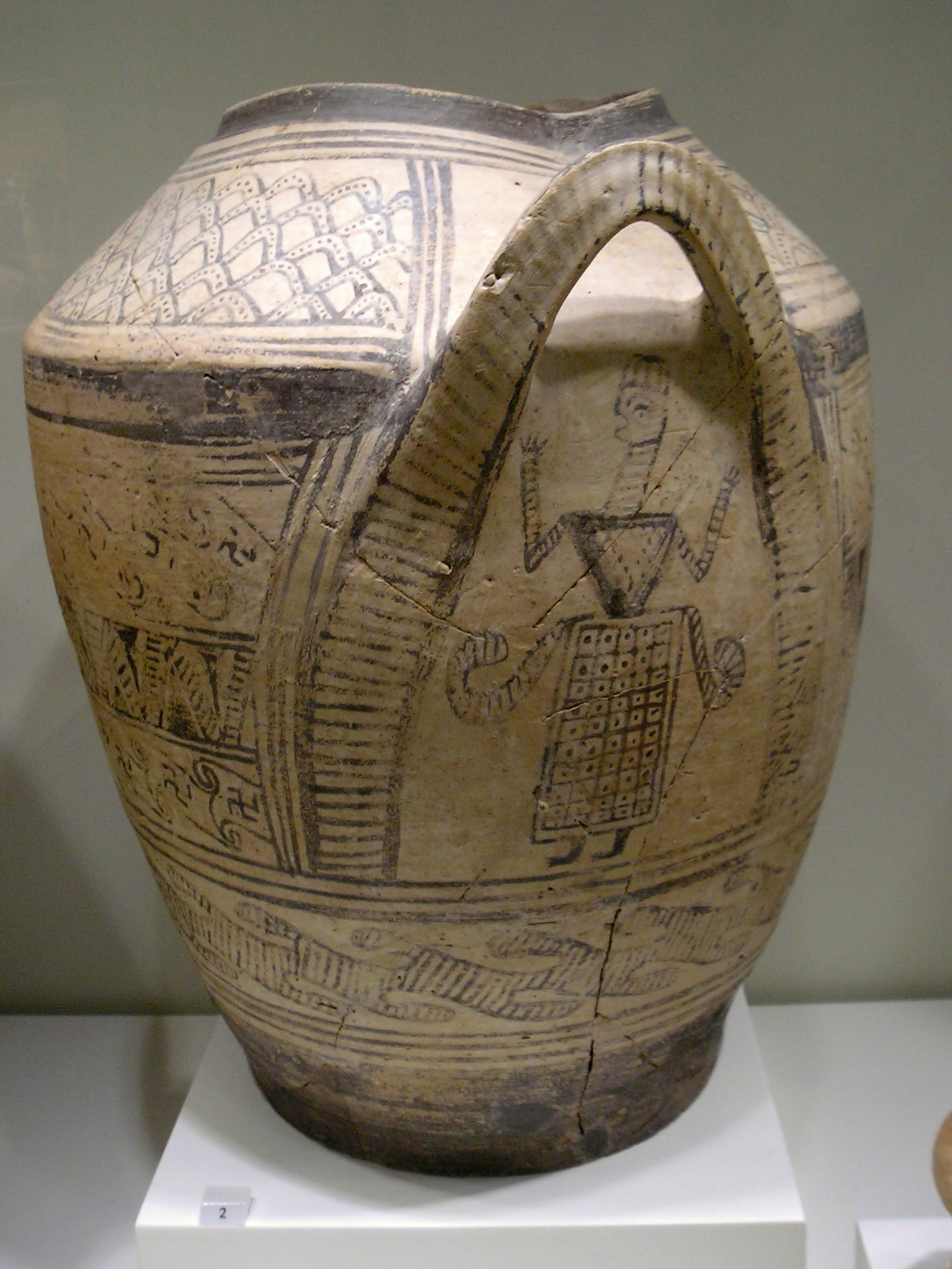
Potnia theron, Fortetsa near Knossos, 850–800 BCE

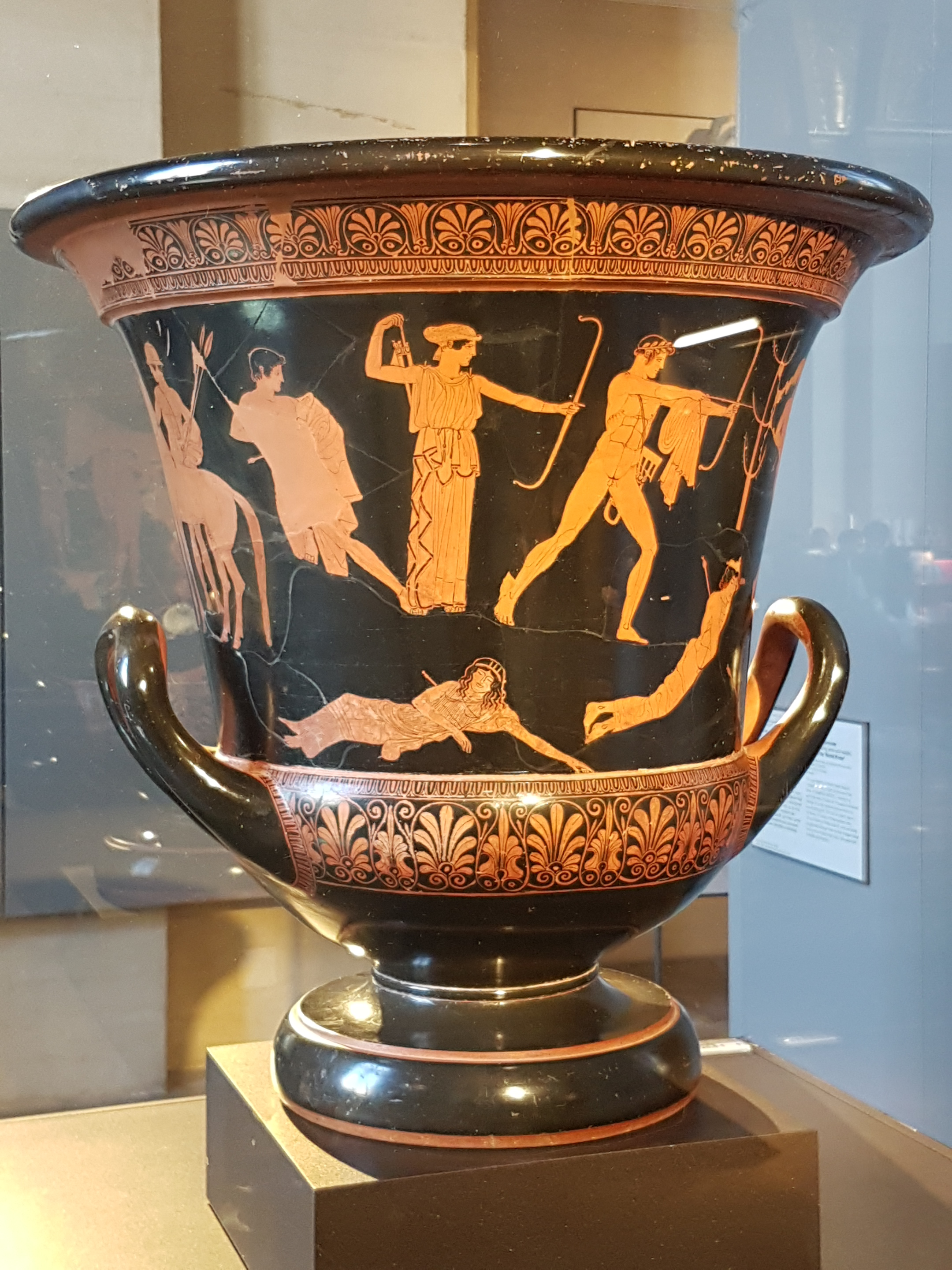
Apollo and Artemis kill the children of Niobe, 460–450 BCE by the Niobid Painter. Louvre, Paris.

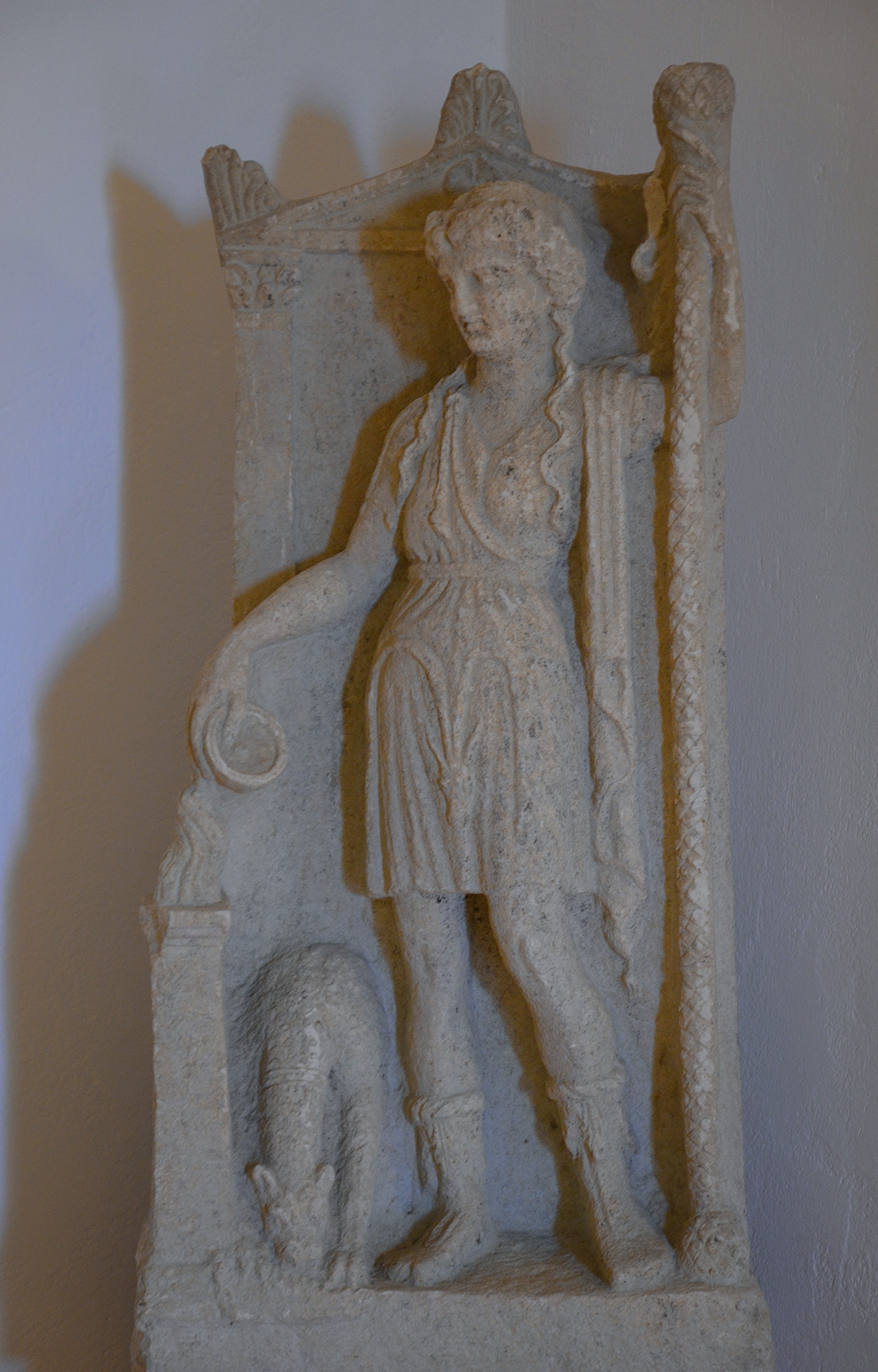
Artemis Hecate, as a goddess protector of the necropolis. Marble, 3rd century CE, Apollonia, Albania.

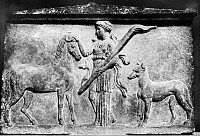
Votive figure Artemis and Hecate

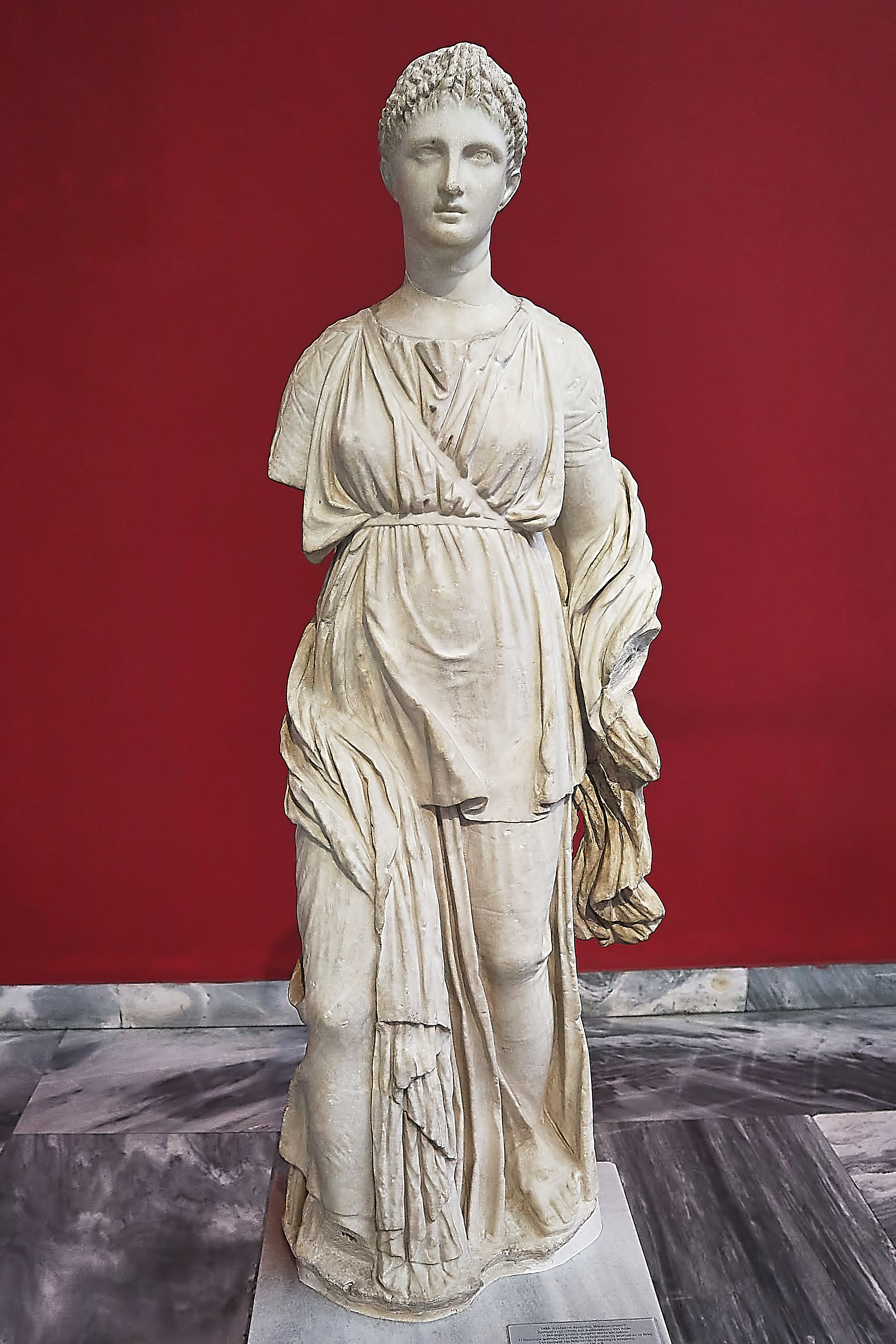
Artemis Diadoumena. Statuette of Artemis from Delos (1st cent. BCE) at the National Archaeological Museum, Athens

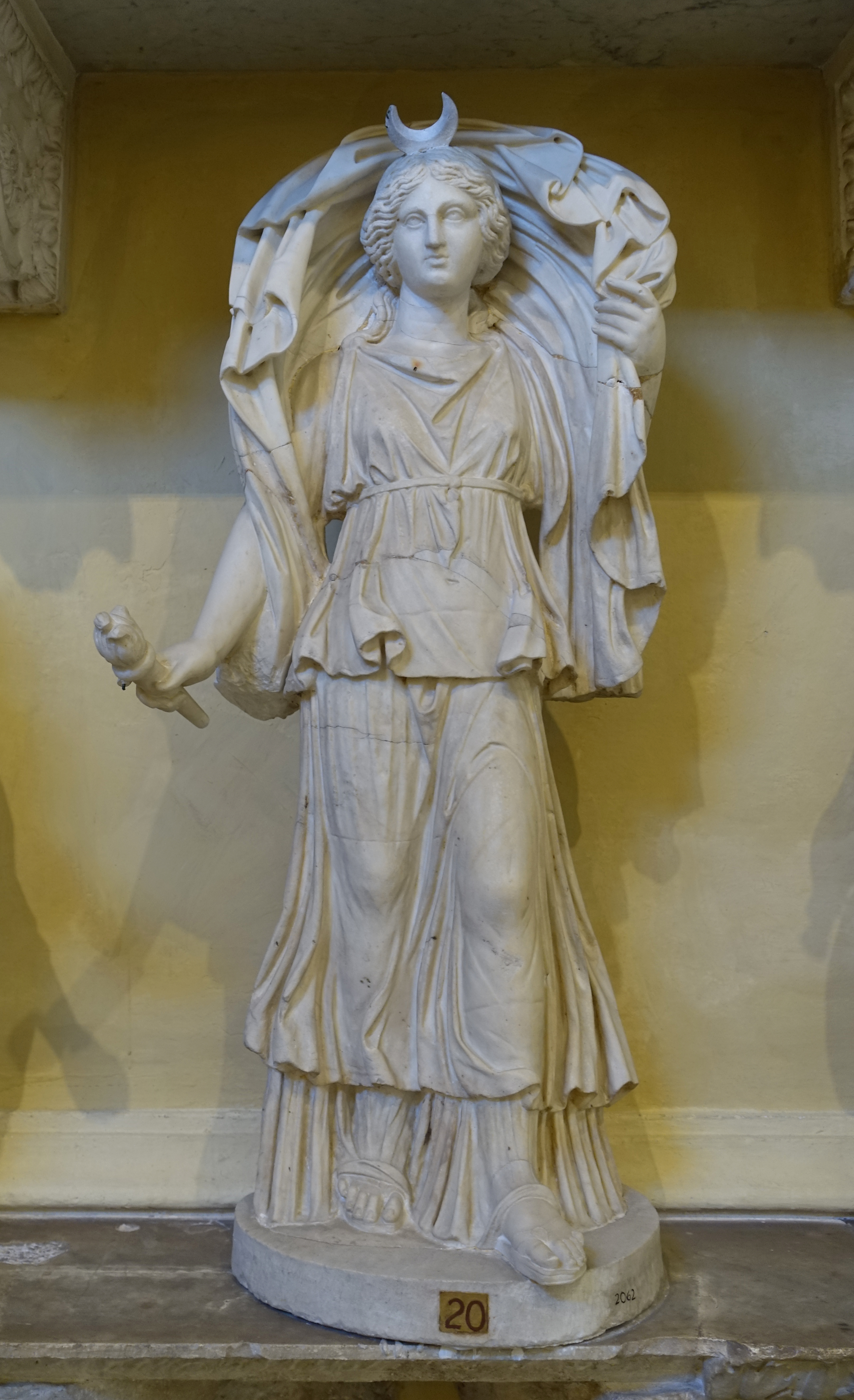
Marble statue of Artemis-Selene with torch, 3rd century. Museo Chiaramonti – Vatican Museums

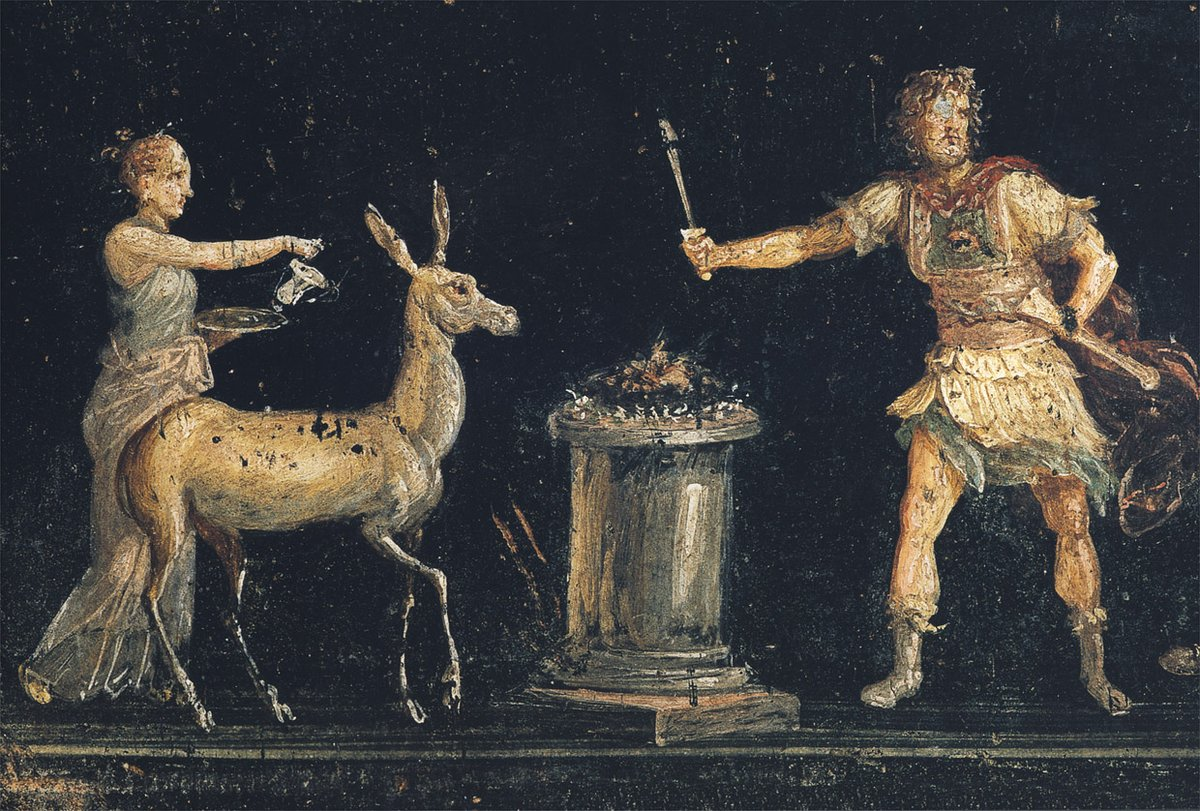
Scene from sacrifice in honour of Artemis-Diana who is accompanied by a deer. Fresco from the triclinium of the house of Vettii in Pompeii, Italy, between 62 CE and 79 CE (Destruction of Pompeii).

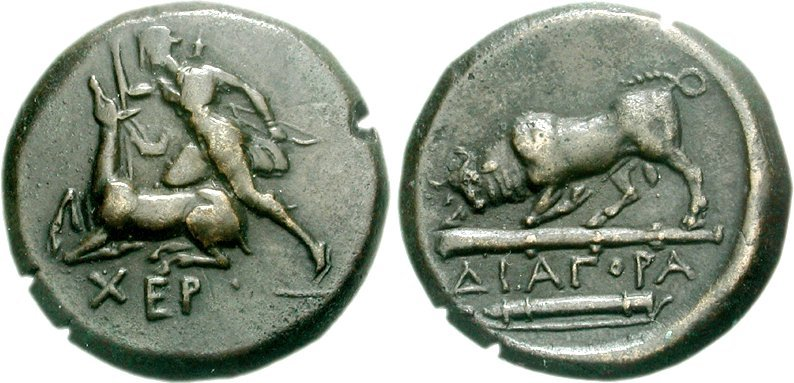
Coin from Tauric Chersonesus with Artemis, deer, bull, club and quiver (c. 300 BCE)

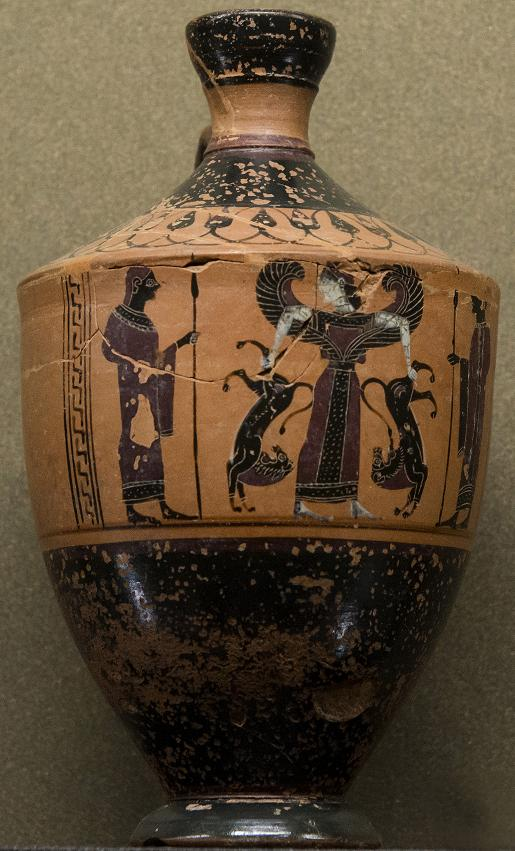
Artémis Potnia Theron, 560–550 BCE

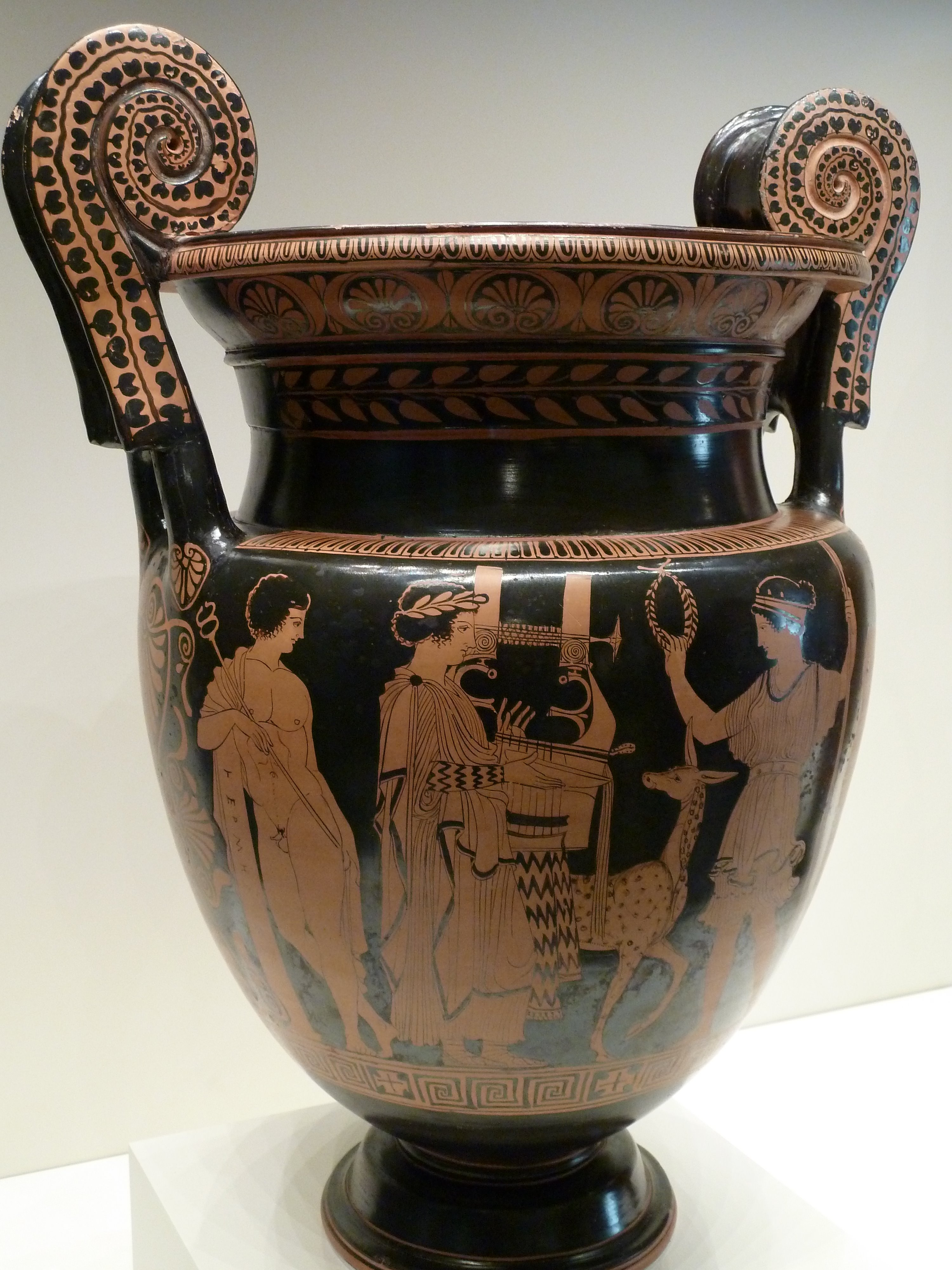
Mixing Vessel with Hermes, Apollo and Artemis. Lucanian, 415–400 BCE, attributed to the Palermo Painter. J. Paul Getty Museum, California
Modern art

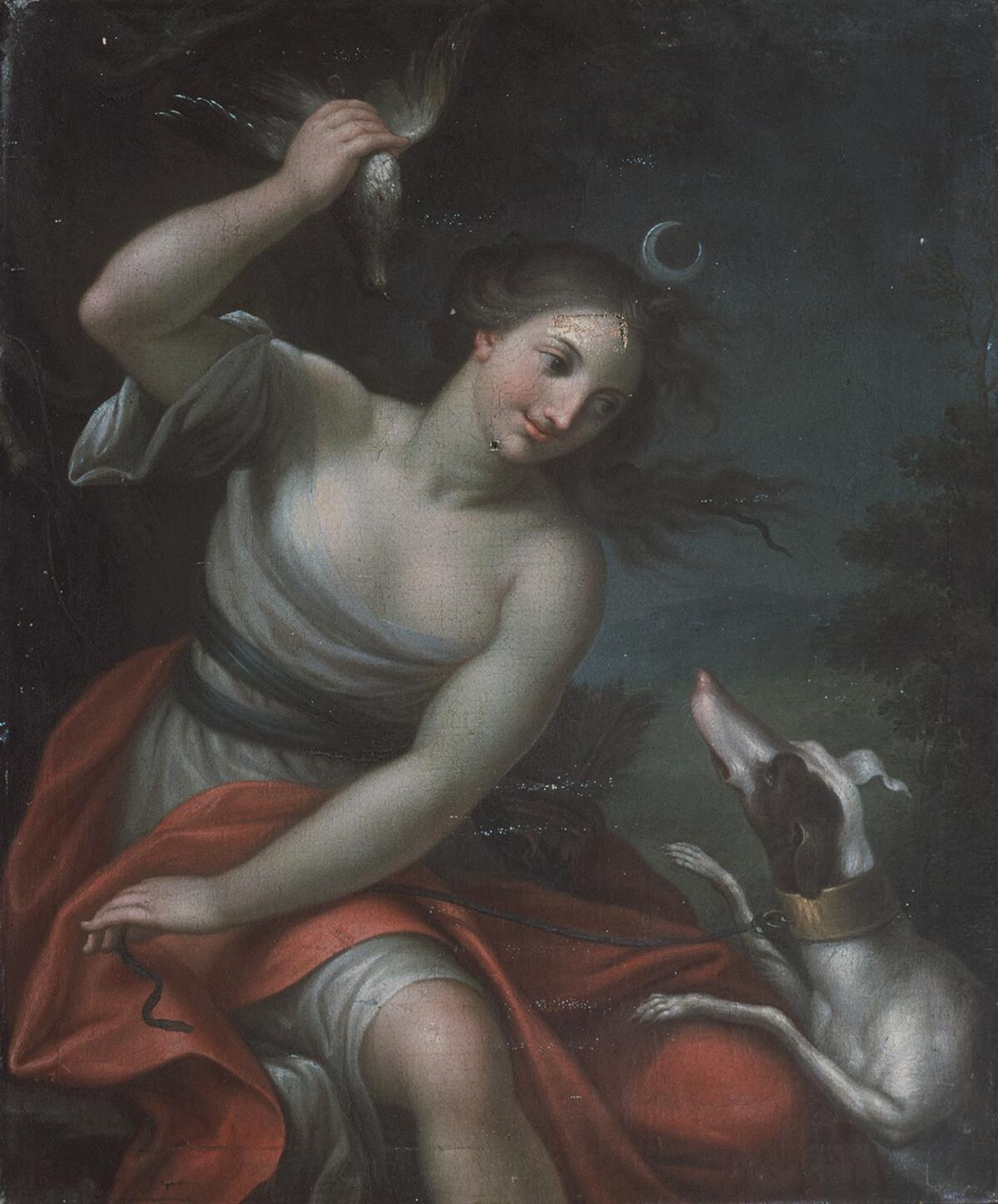
Artemis-Diana and her hound

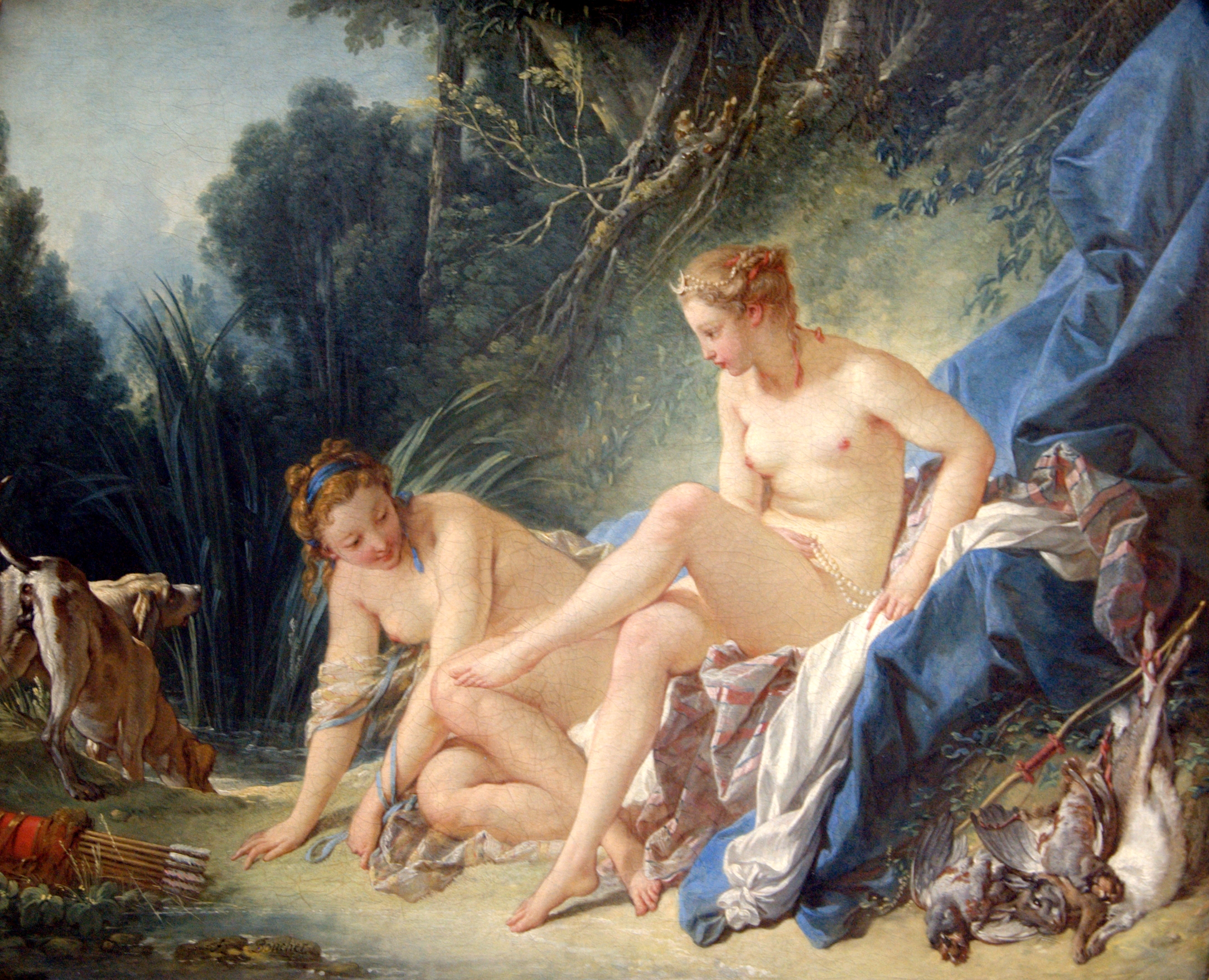
Boucher, Artemis-Diana, Louvre

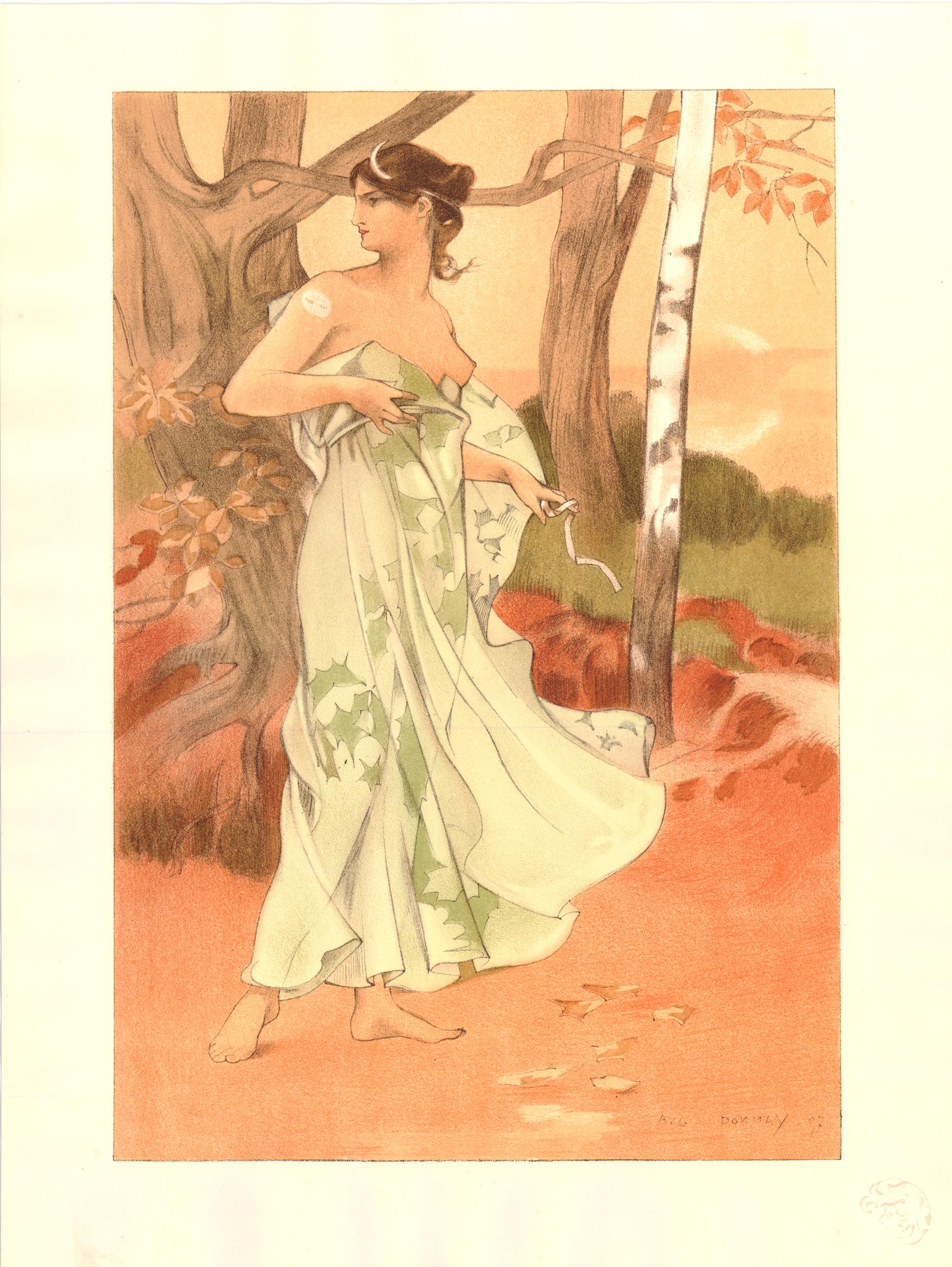
Artemis in a landscape

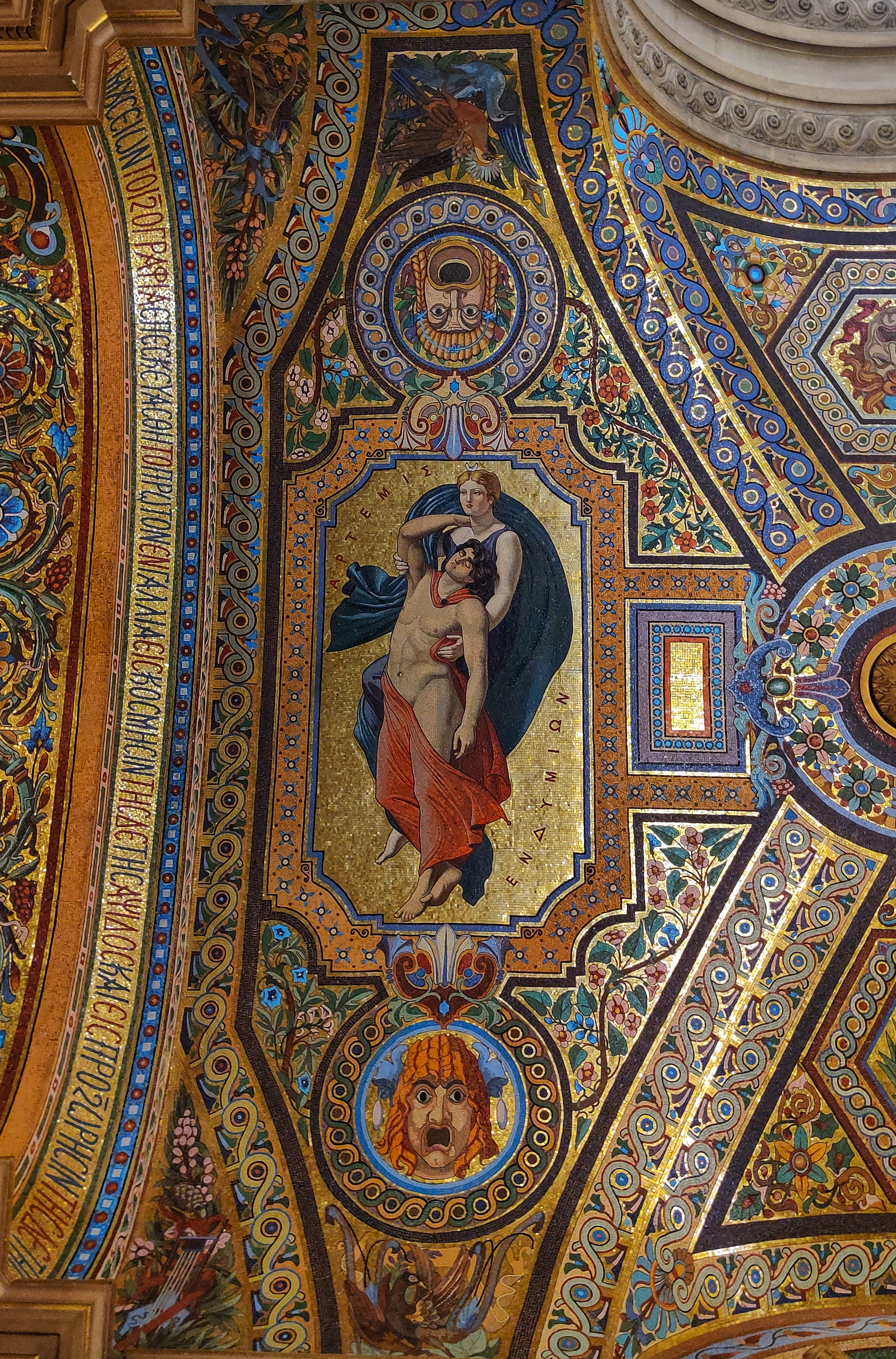
Artemis-Endymion-Palais-Garnier

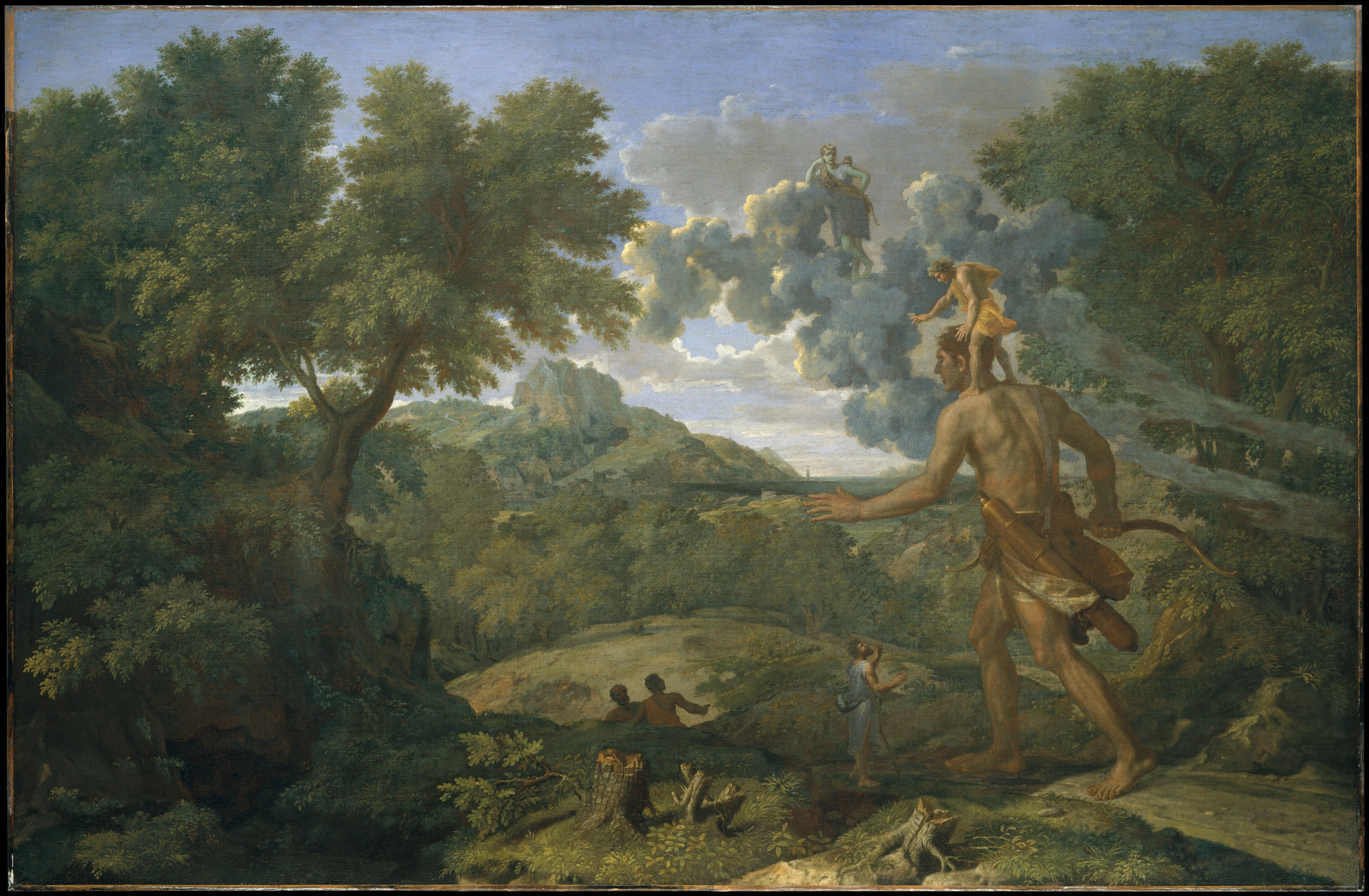
Nicolas Poussin (1658) "Landscape with blind Orion seeking the sun". Metropolitan Museum of Arts, Manhattan, New York.

== Legacy ==
=== In astronomy ===
- 105 Artemis (an asteroid discovered in 1868)
- Artemis (crater) (a tiny crater on the Moon, named in 2010)
- Artemis Chasma (a nearly circular fracture on the surface of the planet Venus, described in 1980)
- Artemis Corona (an oval feature largely enclosed by the Artemis Chasma, also described in 1980)
- Acronym (ArTeMiS) for "Architectures de bolometres pour des Telescopes a grand champ de vue dans le domaine sub-Millimetrique au Sol", a large bolometer camera in the submillimeter range that was installed in 2010 at the Atacama Pathfinder Experiment (APEX), located in the Atacama Desert in northern Chile.

=== In taxonomy ===
The taxonomic genus Artemia, which entirely comprises the family Artemiidae, derives from Artemis. Artemia species are aquatic crustaceans known as brine shrimp, the best-known species of which, Artemia salina, or sea monkeys, was first described by Carl Linnaeus in his Systema Naturae in 1758. Artemia species live in salt lakes, and although they are almost never found in an open sea, they do appear along the Aegean coast near Ephesus, where the Temple of Artemis once stood.

=== In modern spaceflight ===
The Artemis program is an ongoing robotic and crewed spaceflight program which has the goal of landing "the first woman and the next man" on the lunar south pole region. The program is being carried out by NASA, U.S. commercial spaceflight companies, and international partners such as the European Space Agency, the Japan Aerospace Exploration Agency, and the Canadian Space Agency.

== Genealogy ==
Artemis's family tree

Gaia
Uranus
Uranus's genitals	Coeus	Phoebe	Cronus	Rhea
Leto	Zeus	Hera	Poseidon	Hades	Demeter	Hestia
Apollo	ARTEMIS	a
b
Ares	Hephaestus
Metis
Athena
Maia
Hermes
Semele
Dionysus
Dione
a	b
Aphrodite

== See also ==
- Bendis
- Dali (goddess)
- Janus
- Lunar deity
- Palermo Fragment
- Regarding Tauropolos:
  - Bull (mythology)
  - Iphigenia in Tauris
  - Taurus (Mythology)

== Bibliography ==
- Aelian, On Animals, Volume III: Books 12–17, translated by A. F. Scholfield, Loeb Classical Library No. 449, Cambridge, Massachusetts, Harvard University Press, 1959. Online version at Harvard University Press. ISBN 978-0-674-99494-2.
- Apollodorus, Apollodorus, The Library, with an English Translation by Sir James George Frazer, F.B.A., F.R.S. in 2 Volumes. Cambridge, MA, Harvard University Press; London, William Heinemann Ltd. 1921. Online version at the Perseus Digital Library.
- Aratus Solensis, Phaenomena translated by G. R. Mair. Loeb Classical Library Volume 129. London: William Heinemann, 1921. Online version at the Topos Text Project.
- Arnold, Irene Ringwood (1972). "Festivals of Ephesus". American Journal of Archaeology. 77 (1): 17–22. doi:10.2307/503607. JSTOR 503607. S2CID 191403956.
- Athenaeus, The Learned Banqueters, Volume V: Books 10.420e–11. Edited and translated by S. Douglas Olson. Loeb Classical Library 274. Cambridge, MA: Harvard University Press, 2009.
- Budin, Stephanie, Artemis, Routledge publications, 2016, ISBN 978-0-415-72541-5. Google books.
- Burkert, Walter, Greek Religion, Harvard University Press, 1985. ISBN 0-674-36281-0.
- Callimachus. Hymns, translated by Alexander William Mair (1875–1928). London: William Heinemann; New York: G.P. Putnam's Sons. 1921. Internet Archive. Online version at the Topos Text Project.
- Celoria, Francis, The Metamorphoses of Antoninus Liberalis: A Translation with a Commentary, Routledge, 1992. ISBN 978-0-415-06896-3.
- Cicero, Nature of the Gods, from the Treatises of M. T. Cicero, translated by Charles Duke Yonge (1812–1891), Bohn edition of 1878, in the public domain. Text available online at Topos text.
- Collins-Clinton, Jacquelyn, Cosa: The Sculpture and Furnishings in Stone and Marble, University of Michigan Press, 2020, ISBN 978-0-472-13159-4. Google books.
- Diodorus Siculus, Bibliotheca Historica. Vol 1–2. Immanel Bekker. Ludwig Dindorf. Friedrich Vogel. in aedibus B. G. Teubneri. Leipzig. 1888–1890. Greek text available at the Perseus Digital Library.
- Evelyn-White, Hugh, The Homeric Hymns and Homerica with an English Translation by Hugh G. Evelyn-White. Homeric Hymns. Cambridge, Massachusetts, Harvard University Press; London, William Heinemann Ltd. 1914. Internet Archive.
- Fontenrose, Joseph Eddy, Orion: The Myth of the Hunter and the Huntress, University of California Press, 1981. ISBN 0-520-09632-0.
- Forbes Irving, P. M. C., Metamorphosis in Greek Myths, Clarendon Press Oxford, 1990. ISBN 978-0-198-14730-5.
- Freeman, Kathleen, Ancilla to the Pre-Socratic Philosophers: A Complete Translation of the Fragments in Diels, Fragmente Der Vorsokratiker, Harvard University Press, 1983. ISBN 9780674035010.
- Gantz, Timothy, Early Greek Myth: A Guide to Literary and Artistic Sources, Johns Hopkins University Press, 1996, Two volumes: ISBN 978-0-8018-5360-9 (Vol. 1), ISBN 978-0-8018-5362-3 (Vol. 2).
- Robert Graves (1955) 1960. The Greek Myths (Penguin)
- Grimal, Pierre, The Dictionary of Classical Mythology, Wiley-Blackwell, 1996. ISBN 978-0-631-20102-1.
- Hansen, William, Handbook of Classical Mythology, ABC-CLIO, 2004. ISBN 978-1576072264.
- Hard, Robin, The Routledge Handbook of Greek Mythology: Based on H.J. Rose's "Handbook of Greek Mythology", Psychology Press, 2004, ISBN 9780415186360. Google Books.
- Homer, The Iliad with an English Translation by A. T. Murray, PhD in two volumes. Cambridge, MA., Harvard University Press; London, William Heinemann, Ltd. 1924. Online version at the Perseus Digital Library.
- Hyginus, De astronomia, in The Myths of Hyginus, edited and translated by Mary A. Grant, Lawrence: University of Kansas Press, 1960. Online version at ToposText.
- Hyginus, Fabulae, in The Myths of Hyginus, edited and translated by Mary A. Grant, Lawrence: University of Kansas Press, 1960. Online version at ToposText.
- Immendörfer, Michael (2017). Ephesians and Artemis: The Cult of the Great Goddess of Ephesus as the Epistle's Context. Mohr Siebeck. ISBN 978-3-16-155264-9.
- Kerényi, Karl (1951), The Gods of the Greeks, Thames and Hudson, London, 1951.
- Keightley, Thomas (1838). The Mythology of Ancient Greece and Italy. Whittaker and Co.
- Konstan, David (2014). Beauty: The Fortunes of an Ancient Greek Idea. Oxford University Press. ISBN 978-0-19-992726-5.
- Liddell, Henry George, Robert Scott, A Greek-English Lexicon, revised and augmented throughout by Sir Henry Stuart Jones with the assistance of Roderick McKenzie, Clarendon Press Oxford, 1940. Online version at the Perseus Digital Library.
- Mikalson, Jon D., The Sacred and Civil Calendar of the Athenian Year, Princeton University Press, 1975. Google books.
- Morford, Mark P. O., Robert J. Lenardon, Classical Mythology, Eighth Edition, Oxford University Press, 2007. ISBN 978-0-19-530805-1. Internet Archive.
- Most, G. W., Hesiod, Theogony, Works and Days, Testimonia, Edited and translated by Glenn W. Most, Loeb Classical Library No. 57, Cambridge, Massachusetts, Harvard University Press, 2018. ISBN 978-0-674-99720-2. Online version at Harvard University Press.
- Most, G. W., Hesiod: The Shield, Catalogue of Women, Other Fragments, Loeb Classical Library, No. 503, Cambridge, Massachusetts, Harvard University Press, 2007, 2018. ISBN 978-0-674-99721-9. Online version at Harvard University Press.
- Nonnus, Dionysiaca; translated by Rouse, W. H. D., in three volumes. Loeb Classical Library No. 346, Cambridge, Massachusetts, Harvard University Press; London, William Heinemann Ltd. 1940. Internet Archive.
- Ovid, Metamorphoses, Brookes More, Boston, Cornhill Publishing Co. 1922. Online version at the Perseus Digital Library.
- Ovid. Metamorphoses, Volume I: Books 1–8. Translated by Frank Justus Miller. Revised by G. P. Goold. Loeb Classical Library No. 42. Cambridge, Massachusetts: Harvard University Press, 1977, first published 1916. ISBN 978-0-674-99046-3. Online version at Harvard University Press.
- Ovid, Ovid's Fasti: With an English translation by Sir James George Frazer, London: W. Heinemann LTD; Cambridge, Massachusetts, Harvard University Press, 1959. Internet Archive.
- The J. Paul Getty Museum Journal: Volume 24, 1996, ISBN 0-89236-397-5. Google books.
- The Oxford Classical Dictionary, second edition, Hammond, N. G. L. and Howard Hayes Scullard (editors), Oxford University Press, 1992. ISBN 0-19-869117-3.
- Pannen, Imke, When the Bad Bleeds: Mantic Elements in English Renaissance Revenge Tragedy, Volume 3 of Representations & Reflections; V&R unipress GmbH, 2010. ISBN 9783899716405.
- Papathomopoulos, Manolis, Antoninus Liberalis: Les Métamorphoses, Collection Budé, Paris, Les Belles Lettres, 1968. ISBN 978-2-251-00020-6.
- Pausanias, Pausanias Description of Greece with an English Translation by W. H. S. Jones, Litt.D., and H. A. Ormerod, M.A., in 4 Volumes. Cambridge, Massachusetts, Harvard University Press; London, William Heinemann Ltd. 1918. Online version at the Perseus Digital Library.
- Pindar, The Odes of Pindar including the Principal Fragments with an Introduction and an English Translation by Sir John Sandys, Litt.D., FBA. Cambridge, MA., Harvard University Press; London, William Heinemann Ltd. 1937. Greek text available at the Perseus Digital Library.
- Powell, Barry B. (2012). Classical Myth. Pearson. ISBN 978-0-205-17607-6.
- Rutherford, Ian (2001). Pindar's Paeans: A Reading of the Fragments with a Survey of the Genre. New York: Oxford University Press. ISBN 0-19-814381-8.
- Shelmerdine, Susan (1995). The Homeric Hymns. Focus Publishing. ISBN 978-1-58510-477-2.
- Smith, William; Dictionary of Greek and Roman Biography and Mythology, London (1873).
- Strabo, The Geography of Strabo. Edition by H. L. Jones. Cambridge, Mass.: Harvard University Press; London: William Heinemann, Ltd. 1924. Online version at the Perseus Digital Library.
- Toorn, Karel van der; Becking, Bob; Horst, Pieter Willem van der, eds. (1999), Dictionary of Deities and Demons in the Bible, 2nd ed., Grand Rapids: Wm. B. Eerdmans Publishing, p. 92.
- Tripp, Edward, Crowell's Handbook of Classical Mythology, Thomas Y. Crowell Co; First edition (June 1970). ISBN 069022608X.
- West, M. L. (2003), Greek Epic Fragments: From the Seventh to the Fifth Centuries BC, edited and translated by Martin L. West, Loeb Classical Library No. 497, Cambridge, Massachusetts, Harvard University Press, 2003. ISBN 978-0-674-99605-2. Online version at Harvard University Press.
- Sacks, David (1 January 1995). Murray, Oswyn (ed.). A Dictionary of the Ancient Greek World. Oxford, England, United Kingdom: Oxford University Press. ISBN 978-0195112061.
- Shen, Ann (3 April 2018). Legendary Ladies: 50 Goddesses to Empower and Inspire You. San Francisco, United States: Chronicle Books. ISBN 978-1452163413.
- Van Windekens, Albert Joris (1986), Dictionnaire Étymologique Complémentaire de la Langue Grecque, Leuven Peeters, ISBN 90-6831-067-4
