= Sosipolis =

Sosipolis (Greek: Σωσίπολις, lit. 'City saviour') may refer to:

== Greek deities ==
- Sosipolis, an epithet of Zeus. There was a temple of Zeus Sosipolis at Magnesia on the Maeander
- Sosipolis, a native god of Elis, son of the goddess Eileithyia. There was a sanctuary and a shrine dedicated to him at Olympia
- Sosipolis, the name appears on coins from Gela representing a female deity, protectress of the city

== People ==
- Sosipolis of Antissa, a male native of Antissa at Lesbos. According to Aristotle, the city every year held a big festival for Dionysus, but one year the city didn't have funds. On the proposal of Sosipolis, the people after vowing that they would offer to Dionysus a double amount next year, collected all and sold it.
- Sosipolis of Athens, father of the poet Eupolis
