= Amnisiades =

Nymph daughters of Amnisus

In Greek mythology, the Amnisiades (Ancient Greek: Αμνισιαδες, romanized: Amnisiádes, lit. 'nymphs of Amnisos') or Amnisides (Ancient Greek: Αμνισιδες) are nymphs of the Amnisos river in Crete.

== Mythology ==
=== Callimachus ===
The nymphs of the Amnisos are mentioned thrice in Callimachus's Hymn to Artemis. Near the beginning of the Hymn, the goddess asks her father Zeus for twenty of the Amnisiades to be part of her retinue, alongside sixty of the Oceanids, saying that the former group would:

take care of my high hunting boots and, whenever I am no longer shooting at lynxes and deer, my swift hounds.

She then travels to Crete to pick up the Amnisiades. Later in the Hymn, they are described as tending for Artemis's deer.

=== Association with Artemis ===
Along the Amnisos river, there exists a cave which was dedicated to the goddess Eileithyia, with her having been venerated there as early as the Mycenaean era. According to Ivana Petrovic, is it highly likely Artemis and Eileilthyia were assimilated at this cave, or that at some point the worship of Eileithyia there was superseded by that of Artemis. In Jennifer Larson's view, an identification of the two goddesses here is likely the reason for Artemis being connected with the nymphs of this river.

=== Later references ===
Apollonius of Rhodes, following Callimachus, relates that among the companions of Artemis are nymphs who have come "from the very source of the Amnisus". Stephanus of Byzantium also mentions the Amnisiades, calling them Naiads.
