= Boeo =

Ancient Greek poet

Boeo or Boio (Ancient Greek: Βοιὼ) was an ancient Greek poet. Her dates are unknown, but the earliest surviving stories about her date to the third century BC, and Ian Plant suggests a third century date for her.

According to Pausanias, Boeo was from Delphi. He reports that Boeo wrote a hymn which told how the Hypoboreans built the temple to Apollo at Delphi, and that the poet Olen was the first oracle there and the inventor of the hexameter. Both Olen and the Hypoboreans were more usually associated with the sanctuary of Apollo at Delos than Delphi, and the founding of the oracle at Delphi and the invention of the hexameter were traditionally attributed to Phemonoe; the fusion of these two traditions appears to be Boeo's own innovation.

Boeo was possibly also credited by Philochorus as the author of the Ornithogonia ("The Birth of the Birds"), who in other sources is named Boios. None of the poem survives, but it may have been the source of some of Ovid's Metamorphoses. W. Robert Connor suggests that the title parodies Hesiod's Theogony ("the birth of the gods"). Paul Forbes Irving suggests that the Ornithogonia was either attributed to Boio, or the author adopted the name Boios in reference to her.

According to the Byzantine encyclopedia the Suda, Boio was sometimes considered the mother of the epic poet Palaephatus of Athens.
