= Arethusa (mythology) =

Set of mythological Greek characters

In Greek mythology, Arethusa (/ˌærɪˈθjuːzə/; Ancient Greek: Ancient Greek: Ἀρέθουσα, romanized: Aréthousa) may refer to the following personages:

- Arethusa, one of the 50 Nereids, sea-nymph daughters of the 'Old Man of the Sea' Nereus and the Oceanid Doris. She was counted in the train of Cyrene along with her sister Opis, Deiopea and Ephyra.
- Arethusa, a nymph of a spring who was pursued by the river god Alpheus. She was a huntress and attendant of Artemis. She may be the same with the above Arethusa.
- Arethusa, one of the Hesperides according to Apollodorus.
- Arethusa, the Boeotian daughter of Hyperes, son of Poseidon and the Pleiad Alcyone. She was the mother of Abas, king of the Abantians in Euboea by Poseidon. The god had intercourse with Arethusa in Boeotian Euripus and was changed into a fountain in Chalcis by Hera.
- Arethusa, a Euboean princess as daughter of King Abas and thus, granddaughter of the above Arethusa. She was the sister of Alcon, Dias and probably, of Canethus and Chalcodon.
- Arethusa, a Cretan woman, whose son was killed in the Trojan War. She was married to Thersander and their son was Hyllus.
- Arethusa, one of Actaeon's dogs.
- Arethusa, an Ithacan woman who killed herself and gave her name to a spring after the death of her son Corax.
