= Opis (disambiguation) =

Opis is an ancient Babylonian city on the Tigris.

Opis may also refer to:

- Oil Price Information Service
- Ops, a Sabine goddess
- Opis (mythology), several characters from Greek mythology, mostly nymphs, including one of the Nereids
- Islamabad International Airport (ICAO airport code: OPIS), Pakistan
