= Belida angelicae =

Scientific classification
- Kingdom: Animalia
- Phylum: Arthropoda
- Class: Insecta
- Order: Diptera
- Family: Tachinidae
- Subfamily: Exoristinae
- Tribe: Blondeliini
- Genus: Belida
- Species: B. angelicae

Binomial name
- Belida angelicae (Meigen, 1824)

Synonyms
- Belida flavipalpis Robineau-Desvoidy, 1863; Masicera spinuligera Rondani, 1861; Tachina angelicae Meigen, 1824; Tachina futilis Zetterstedt, 1844; Tachina viduata Meigen, 1824

Species of fly

Belida angelicae is a species of fly in the family Tachinidae. It is a parasitoid of sawflies from the genus Arge.

== Distribution ==
British Isles, Czech Republic, Hungary, Poland, Romania, Slovakia, Denmark, Finland, Norway, Sweden, Bulgaria, Corse, Croatia, Italy, Portugal, Slovenia, Spain, Turkey, Austria, France, Germany, Netherlands, Switzerland, Israel, Palestine, Mongolia, Russia, Transcaucasia.
