= Ephyra (mythology) =

Deity name used in Greek mythology

Ephyra (/ˈɛfərə/; Ancient Greek: Ἐφύρα, romanized: Ephýra) or Ephyre (/ˈɛfəriː/; Ancient Greek: Ἐφύρη, romanized: Ephýrē) was another name for ancient Corinth. It also refers to two figures in Greek mythology:

- Ephyra, one of the 3,000 Oceanids, water-nymph daughters of the Titans Oceanus and his sister-wife Tethys. Otherwise, she was called the daughter or wife of the Titan Epimetheus. Ephyra was the first to dwell in the land of Ephyrae, which was later called Corinth. In some accounts, her father was called Myrmex. Ephyra was sometimes attributed to be the mother of Aeëtes by Helios.
- Ephyre, one of the 50 Nereids, sea-nymph daughters of the "Old Man of the Sea" Nereus and the Oceanid Doris. She was in the train of Cyrene along with her sister Opis, Deiopea and Arethusa. This Ephyra may be the same to the above Oceanid.

Cichyrus in Epirus was also known as Ephyra.

== Popular culture ==
- In the game, Hades II (the sequel to Hades), "Ephyra" is the name of a City-state (a Polis) sacred to Hades & Persephone (parents of the protagonist, Melinoë), having been founded near a known entrance to the underworld (a Ploutonion similar to the Necromanteion of Acheron)--now overrun by the forces of Cronus, the titan of time (making it a necropolis). Possibly referring to modern-day Cranon, known as "Ephyra" back then, or the above-mentioned Corinth. Here, the 'helpful-hand' character for Melinoë while on her quest is her fellow sorceress (and a first-cousin, once-removed, due to the game-franchise Retconning Demeter and Helios as siblings) and an accomplished pharmakís, Lady Medea (a grand-daughter of Helios'), stationed up in Ephyra prior by Lady Hecate to be her eyes and ears there.
- In Greek mythology, Sisyphus was the founder and king of Ephyra (now known as Corinth).
