= Deiopea (mythology) =

In Greek and Roman mythology, Deiopeia (Ancient Greek: Δηϊόπεια or Δηιόπεια, romanized: Deïopeia or Dēĭŏpēa, lit. 'divine face', 'face of a god' or 'benefit of the gods') may refer to two characters:

- Deiopea, one of the Nereids, thus daughter of the Old Man of the Sea, Nereus and the Oceanid Doris. She was one of nymphs in the train of Cyrene along with her sisters, Ephyre, Opis and Arethusa.
- Deiopea, one of Juno's fourteen nymphs. She is described in the Virgil's Aeneid as being praestanti corpore, i.e., having an excellent body. Juno promises her in marriage to the king of the winds, Aeolus, in return for his help in shipwrecking the Trojan refugees. The asteroid 184 Dejopeja is named after her.
