= Eileithyia Cave =

Cave and archaeological site in Greece

- Cave of Eileithyia
- Location within Greece
- 35°19′29.2″N 25°12′21″E
- Periods: Neolithic, Bronze Age
- Location: Crete
- Region: Greece

Eileithyia Cave (also the Cave of Eileithyia) was a sacred cave dedicated to the goddess of childbirth, Eileithyia, on the island of Crete. The site was used from the Neolithic to the Roman era, with worship flourishing in the Late Minoan period. It is located one kilometre (0.6 mi) south of the town of Amnisos.

== Description ==
It has been suggested that rock formations within the cave resemble female figures, most prominently a stalagmite in the centre that appears as a standing female.

== Archaeology ==
Eileithyia Cave was occupied by prehistoric human settlers from the Neolithic period until around 400 BCE. The archaeological discoveries made in the cave are on display at the Iraklion Museum and the Archaeological Museum of Iraklion. Pottery ranging from the Neolithic to Roman periods has been discovered in the cave, with the most significant number of finds coming from the Minoan era. Four anthropomorphic vases from the Orientalizing period, which could be of Greek origin were found in the sanctuary. They are similar to Egyptian vases that show Isis nursing her infant son Horus. The sanctuary is the largest collection of Egyptian and Egyptianizing artifacts on Crete.

The cave was discovered by Christoforos Anerrapsis of Candia.

== Mythology ==
The Eileithyia Cave was revered in ancient Greek mythology as the birthplace and principal sanctuary of Eileithyia, goddess of childbirth and midwifery, a goddess already known in Mycenaean times as E-re-u-ti-ja.

The cave is mentioned in Odysseus's Cretan tale to Penelope in the Odyssey. Disguised and hiding his identity, he invents a story in which he once gave hospitality to Odysseus at Amnisos, “where there is a cave of Eileithyia” (he pretends to have met and hosted himself as part of the false story).”

The Homeric Hymn to Delian Apollo recounts that a jealous Hera detained Eileithyia on Crete for nine days and nights, preventing her from reaching Delos until Iris finally fetched her. Only then could Leto give birth to Apollo and Artemis, establishing the cave as Eileithyia’s primary Cretan home and the source of her panhellenic power to hasten or delay labor.

Pausanias, writing in the 2nd century CE, confirms that Greeks of his day still identified the cave at Amnisos as the actual dwelling place of Eileithyia.
