= Palaephatus =

Ancient Greek author

Palaephatus (/pəˈlɛfətəs/; Ancient Greek: Παλαίφατος) was the author of a rationalizing text on Greek mythology, the paradoxographical work On Incredible Things (Περὶ ἀπίστων (ἱστοριῶν); Incredibilia), which survives in a (probably corrupt) Byzantine edition.

This work consists of an introduction and 52 brief sections on various Greek myths. The first 45 have a common format: a brief statement of a wonder tale from Greek mythology, usually followed by a claim of disbelief ("This is absurd" or "This is not likely" or "The true version is..."), and then a sequence of every-day occurrences which gave rise to the wonder-story through misunderstanding. The last seven are equally brief retellings of myth, without any rationalizing explanation.

Palaephatus's date and name are uncertain; many scholars have concluded that the name "Palaephatus" is a pseudonym. What little evidence is extant suggests that the author was likely active during the late fourth century BCE.

== On Incredible Things ==
Palaephatus's introduction sets his approach between those who believe everything that is said to them and those more subtle minds who believe that none of Greek mythology ever happened. He sets up two premises: that every story derives from some past event, and a principle of uniformity, that "anything which existed in the past now exists and will exist hereafter"; this he derives from the philosophers Melissus and Lamiscus of Samos. So there must be some probable series of events behind all myth; but the "poets and early historians" made them into wonderful tales to amaze their audience. Palaephatus then claims to base what follows on personal research, going to many places and asking older people what happened.

A typical, if short, example of Palaephatus's method and tone is his handling of Callisto:

"The story about Callisto is that while she was out hunting she turned into a bear. What I maintain is that she too during a hunt found her way into a grove of trees where a bear happened to be and was devoured. Her hunting companions saw her going into the grove, but not coming out; they said that the girl turned into a bear." (§14, tr. Jacob Stern)

As is usual in Palaephatus, the miracle is told baldly and without context, and the action of the gods is not mentioned; in the traditional story, Artemis transforms Callisto because of Callisto's unfaithfulness as a priestess. Palaephatus rarely mentions the gods, and when he discusses Actaeon, his statement of disbelief is: "Artemis can do whatever she wants, yet it is not true that a man became a deer or a deer a man" (§6, tr. Stern); his principle of uniformity applies to human beings. Jacob Stern distinguishes this from the more wide-ranging rationalism of Euhemerus: Palaephatus retains Callisto and Actaeon as historic human beings; rationalism extended to the gods can make them deified human beings or personifications of natural forces or of the passions, but does not leave them gods.

Palaephatus uses four principal devices for explaining the wonders of myth, and a number of minor devices:

- The monster or animal was actually a man or thing bearing that name: Cadmus didn't fight a dragon, but a King of Thebes named Draco, who had some ivory tusks; his followers scattered abroad with the tusks, and raised armed men against Thebes (§4). Scylla was a pirate ship with an image (presumably of a dog) on her prow, which attacked Ulysses and inflicted casualties (§20). Hercules attacked a fort named Hydra. When Lernos learned about Hercules he called for reinforcements and troops were sent from Caria. Among these troops was a warrior by the name of Carcinos ["crab"].
- Other double meanings: Mēlon in Greek means both "sheep" and "apple"; so the real story was that Hercules raided a flock of sheep of especially fine, "golden", quality from the daughters of one Hesperus of Miletus; but the poets prefer the golden apples of the Hesperides (§18). Geryon and Cerberus didn't have three heads, they came from Tricarenia, a city, whose name means "three-headed" and which Palaephatus has invented for the purpose. (§24, 39) Similarly, Bellerophon killed, not the monstrous Chimaera, but the lion and the serpent who lived by a fiery chasm on Mount Chimaera in Lycia (by burning down the surrounding forest). Mt. Chimaera is called that by other authors, and is not Palaephatus' invention. (§28)
- Metaphorical expressions which became widespread, and which the poets then took literally: Actaeon wasn't eaten by his dogs; he spent so much on them that "His dogs are devouring Actaeon" became proverbial (§6). A statue of Niobe was put up over her children's grave; passersby began to speak of "the stone Niobe". (§8) Amphion and Zethus would only play if their hearers would work on the walls of Thebes; only in that sense were the walls "built by a lyre", and the addition that the stones moved themselves is fiction. (§41)
- When things were first invented, people saw them as even more wonderful than they were: The Centaurs were not half-man, half-horse; they were the first to learn to ride. (§ 1) Lynceus could see underground, because he was the first miner, and invented the miner's lamp. (§9) Daedalus was the first to make statues with their feet apart, so men said his statues "walked". (§21) And Medea didn't boil old men to make them young; she invented hair-dye and the sauna. Poor feeble Pelias just died in the steam-bath. (§ 43)

== The author's identity and the Suda entries ==
Palaephatus is a very rare name, and many scholars have concluded that it is a pseudonym; as an adjective in epic poetry, it meant of ancient fame; it could also mean speaker of old tales. If Palaephatus wrote (as is perhaps most likely) in Athens in the fourth century BC, rationalizing Greek mythology could be dangerous; Anaxagoras had been sent into exile in the previous century for no more.

The only accounts of the life of any Palaephatus are four entries in the Suda (pi 69, 70, 71, 72), a Byzantine biographical dictionary, compiled about 1000 AD:

=== "Palaephatus of Athens" ===
Palaephatus of Athens, an epic poet, to whom a mythical origin was assigned. According to some he was a son of Actaeus and Boeo, according to others of Iocles and Metaneira, and according to a third statement of Hermes. The time at which he lived is uncertain, but he appears to have been usually placed after Phemonoe, though some writers assigned him even an earlier date. He is represented by Christodorus (Anth. Graec., i. p. 27, ed. Tauchnitz) as an old bard crowned with laurel. The Suda has preserved the titles of the following poems of Palaephatus:

- Κοσμοποιΐα εἰς ἔπη ͵εʹ ("The Making of the World", 5000 lines)
- Ἀπόλλωνος καὶ Ἀρτέμιδος γοναί, ἔπη ͵γʹ ("The Births of Apollo and Artemis", 3000 lines)
- Ἀφροδίτης καὶ Ἔρωτος λόγοι καὶ φωναὶ ἔπη ͵εʹ ("Speeches and Sayings of Aphrodite and Eros", 5000 lines)
- Ἀθηνᾶς ἔρις καὶ Ποσειδῶνος ἔπη ͵αʹ ("Contest of Athena and Poseidon", 1000 lines)
- Λητοῦς πλόκαμος ("Leto's Lock")

=== "Palaephatus of Paros" ===
Palaephatus of Paros, or Priene, attested to have lived in the time of Artaxerxes, however it is unknown which specific ruler this was. Suidas attributes to him the five books of Incredible Things (also five books of On Troy), but adds that many persons assigned this work to Palaephatus of Athens.

=== "Palaephatus of Abydos" ===
Palaephatus of Abydos, an historian who lived in the time of Alexander the Great, and is stated to have been loved (παιδικά) by the philosopher Aristotle, for which the Suda quotes the authority of Philo, Peri paradoxou historias, and of Theodorus of Ilium, Troica, Book 2. Suidas gives the titles of the following works of Palaephatus: Cypriaca, Deliaca, Attica, Arabica.

(Smith explains that some writers believe that this Palaephatus of Abydos wrote the fragment on Assyrian history, which is preserved by Eusebius of Caesarea, and which is quoted by him as the work of Abydenus; but Abydenus is that author's name, not the adjective meaning "from Abydos".)

=== "Palaephatus the Egyptian" ===
Palaephatus, an Egyptian or Athenian, and a grammarian, as he is described by Suidas, who assigns to him the following works:

- Αἰγυπτιακὴ θεολογία ("Egyptian Theology")
- Μυθικῶν βιβλίον αʹ ("On Myths", one book)
- Λύσεις τῶν μυθικῶς εἰρημένων ("Solutions to Problems with Myths")
- Ὑποθέσεις εἰς Σιμωνίδην ("Introductions to Simonides")
- Τρωϊκά ("On Troy"), which some however attributed to the Athenian (No. 1), and others to the Parian (No. 2).
- He also wrote a history of himself.

=== One author behind these traditions ===
Of these, the first Palaephatus is, like Phemonoe, entirely legendary; modern scholars regard the other three as different literary traditions relating to the author of On Incredible Things. The Troica did once exist, and was cited in antiquity for geographical information on the people of the Trojan War, the Troad itself, and the surrounding area of Asia Minor; ancient authors cited the work's seventh and ninth books, so it must have been fairly long.

If the Artaxerxes mentioned by the Suda is Artaxerxes III Ochus, these data are all compatible with a student of Aristotle about 340 BCE, who came from the area around the Hellespont to Athens, and is called the Egyptian, sometimes, because he wrote on Egypt. The only internal evidence in the surviving book are citations of the two philosophers in the introduction and two literary references; if Melissus is Melissus of Samos, he lived in the previous century, and one possible Lamiscus is a Pythagorean contemporary of Plato. The literary references are one citation of Hesiod and the presentation of Alcestis, which is quite similar to Euripides' Alcestis.

== References in ancient literature ==
The comic poet Athenion has a scene in which an interlocutor praises a cook as a new Palaephatus, to which the cook replies by explaining the benefits bestowed on mankind by the first inventor of cooking, who replaced cannibalism by animal sacrifice and roast meat; this alludes to the "first inventor" theories still reflected in our text of Palaephatus. (Athenion's date is uncertain, but if he wrote, as it appears, New Comedy, he should be 3rd or 2nd century BCE.)

Aelius Theon, the rhetorician, spends a chapter discussing Palaephatus' rationalism, using several of the examples in our text of Palaephatus; other, later, authors cite Palaephatus for instances not in our text: Pseudo-Nonnus, the author of some commentaries on Gregory Nazianzen, attributes to Palaephatus the explanation that Cyclopes were so called because they lived in a round island; Eustathius of Thessalonica ascribes to him the explanation that Laomedon secured the help of Poseidon and Apollo in building the walls of Troy because he seized their temple treasuries to pay his workmen.

Some of the references in the Suda say that Palaephatus' work on myths was in five books, some that it was one book; Eusebius, Jerome, and Orosius all write of the first book of Palaephatus, implying that there were more. Jacob Stern, the modern editor, concludes from this, and the missing references, that Palaephatus was originally in five books, and was condensed down to one sometime before the publication of the Suda, although a fuller copy survived so Eustathius could see it in the twelfth century.

== Transmission of the text ==
There are a dozen manuscripts of the present text, differing in length and in order, dating from the thirteenth through sixteenth century. How much of it derives from Palaephatus himself is open to question, although there is general agreement that the seven chapters of straight unrationalized mythology at the end are not. Nicolaus Festa, who edited the text in 1902, believed that Palaephatian texts became a genre, and our present text is a congeries of texts in that genre, most not by Palaephatus himself; Jacob Stern believes that this is a selection from all five books of the original.

== Modern editions ==
Palaephatus's book was first printed by Aldus Manutius in his 1505 edition of Aesop. It became popular as a school text because of its relatively simple Attic Greek, and because the Renaissance approved its approach to classical mythology; it was edited by six more editors before the nineteenth century, due to its popularity. Although Aldus did not include a Latin translation, later editors included one; many reprinted Cornelius Tollius's Latin version, included with his Greek text (Amsterdam, 1649). The first German-language edition was published in the 17th century.

More recent editions include:

- Ernesti, J. H. M. Paläphatus, Von unglaublichen Begebenheiten, griechisch: mit erklärendem Wörterbuche nach den Kapiteln des Paläphatus: sowohl zum Schulgebrauche als zum Selbstunterricht, Leipzig, 1816.
- Westermann, A. In Μυθογράφοι: Scriptores Poeticae Historiae Graeci, Braunschweig, 1843, pp. 268-312.
- Festa, N. Palaephati Περὶ ἀπίστων (Mythographi Graeci, vol. 3, fasc. 2), Leipzig: Bibliotheca Teubneriana, 1902.
- Stern, Joseph. Palaephatus: On Unbelievable Tales. Wauconda, Ill.: Bolchazy-Carducci, 1996 (photoreprint of Festa's Greek text and textual notes, with a translation into English and extensive critical notes).
- Brodersen, K. Die Wahrheit über die griechischen Mythen. Palaiphatos "Unglaubliche Geschichten". Griechisch/Deutsch. Stuttgart, 2002, 3rd ed. 2017, ISBN 978-3-15-019458-4 (Ancient Greek text with German translation).

== See also ==
- Heraclitus the paradoxographer
