= Olen (poet) =

Legendary early poet from Lycia

Olen (Ancient Greek: Ὠλήν) was a legendary early poet from Lycia who went to Delos, where his hymns celebrating the first handmaidens of Apollo in the island of the god's birth and other "ancient hymns" were still part of the cult at Delos in the time of Herodotus:

Arge and Opis came at the same time as the gods of Delos and are honoured by the Delians in a different way. For the Delian women make collections in these maidens' names, and invoke them in the hymn which Olen, a Lycian, composed for them; and the rest of the islanders, and even the Ionians, have been taught by the Delians to do the like. This Olen, who came from Lycia, made the other old hymns also which are sung in Delos.

— Herodotus, Persian Wars, iv.35.1

The hieratic poetry of Olen is now entirely lost. Pausanias wrote, "The Lycian Olen, an earlier poet, who composed for the Delians, among other hymns, one to Eileithyia, styles her 'the clever spinner', clearly identifying her with fate, and makes her older than Cronos." (Description of Greece 8.21.3). Apparently Olen's hymn reflected the pre-Hellenic role of Eileithyia, whom Olympian mythographers like Hesiod recast as a daughter of Zeus and Hera.

The Delphian Pythia Boeo attributed to him the introduction of the cult of Apollo and the invention of the epic meter. Many hymns, nomes (simple songs to accompany the circular dance of the chorus), and oracles, attributed to Olen, were preserved in Delos, revered as Apollo's birthplace. "The legend which was especially attributed to him was that of Apollo's sojourn among the Hyperboreans."
