= 1309 Hyperborea =

Carbonaceous background asteroid

Discovery
- Discovered by: G. Neujmin
- Discovery site: Simeiz Obs.
- Discovery date: 11 October 1931

Designations
- Pronunciation: /haɪpərˈbɔːriːə/
- Named after: Hyperborea (Greek mythology)
- Alternative designations: 1931 TO · 1934 GT; 1971 SG_{1} · 1973 AW_{4} A919 RB · A919 SH
- Minor planet category: main-belt · (outer) background

Orbital characteristics
- Epoch 4 September 2017 (JD 2458000.5)
- Uncertainty parameter 0
- Observation arc: 98.23 yr (35,880 days)
- Aphelion: 3.6888 AU
- Perihelion: 2.7251 AU
- Semi-major axis: 3.2069 AU
- Eccentricity: 0.1503
- Orbital period (sidereal): 5.74 yr (2,098 days)
- Mean anomaly: 292.38°
- Mean motion: 0° 10^{m} 17.76^{s} / day
- Inclination: 10.279°
- Longitude of ascending node: 206.08°
- Argument of perihelion: 244.90°

Physical characteristics
- Dimensions: 55.14±14.34 km 55.48±13.26 km 57.11 km (derived); 57.15±3.9 km 57.570±0.349 km 57.99±0.72 km 61.605±1.019 km 64.40±2.03 km
- Synodic rotation period: 13.858±0.004 h 13.87±0.002; 13.88±0.02 h 13.95±0.02 h
- Geometric albedo: 0.03±0.02; 0.032±0.007; 0.0387±0.0054; 0.04±0.03; 0.0411 (derived); 0.043±0.005; 0.044±0.001; 0.0450±0.007
- Spectral type: C
- Absolute magnitude (H): 10.20 · 10.30 · 10.30±0.11 · 10.40 · 10.43

1309 Hyperborea /haɪpərˈbɔːriːə/ is a carbonaceous background asteroid from the outermost regions of the asteroid belt, approximately 57 kilometers in diameter. It was discovered on 11 October 1931, by Soviet astronomer Grigory Neujmin at the Simeiz Observatory on the Crimean peninsula, and given the provisional designation 1931 TO. The asteroid was named after Hyperborea, the northern homeland of a Greek mythical race of giants.

== Orbit and classification ==
Hyperborea is a non-family asteroid of the main belt's background population. It orbits the Sun in the outermost asteroid belt at a distance of 2.7–3.7 AU once every 5 years and 9 months (2,098 days; semi-major axis of 3.21 AU). Its orbit has an eccentricity of 0.15 and an inclination of 10° with respect to the ecliptic.

The body's observation arc begins at Heidelberg Observatory with its first observations as A919 RB in September 1919, or 12 years prior to its official discovery observation at Simeiz.

== Physical characteristics ==
Hyperborea has been characterized as a carbonaceous C-type asteroid by Pan-STARRS photometric survey.

=== Rotation period ===
Between 2002 and 2017, four rotational lightcurves of Hyperborea were obtained from photometric observations by astronomers Francisco Sold and Pierre Antonini, as well as by astronomers at the Oakley Southern Sky and Rozhen Observatory in Australia and Bulgaria, respectively (U=2+/n.a./3/2). The consolidated lightcurve gave a rotation period of 13.88 hours with a brightness amplitude between 0.34 and 0.41 magnitude.

=== Diameter and albedo ===
According to the surveys carried out by the Infrared Astronomical Satellite IRAS, the Japanese Akari satellite and the NEOWISE mission of NASA's Wide-field Infrared Survey Explorer, Hyperborea measures between 55.14 and 64.40 kilometers in diameter and its surface has an albedo between 0.03 and 0.0450.

The Collaborative Asteroid Lightcurve Link derives an albedo of 0.0411 and a diameter of 57.11 kilometers based on an absolute magnitude of 10.3.

== Naming ==
This minor planet was named after Hyperborea, the homeland of the Hyperboreans, a Greek mythical race of giants associated with the cult of Apollo. Herodotus placed the region far to the north of Thrace beyond the North Wind. It was therefore believed to be a region of perpetual sunshine. Lutz Schmadel, the author of the Dictionary of Minor Planets, learned about the naming from Russian astronomer Nataliya Sergeevna Samoilova-Yakhontova (see 1653 Yakhontovia).
