= Hyperborean maidens =

Characters in Greek mythology

The Hyperborean Maidens is a modern term for a collection of smaller groups of mythical virgins, who travelled from Hyperborea (Note: A mythical land that was far north of the Greek world. It was believed that this was Apollo's favoured people, and that they were not touched by aging or disease. Hyperborea means 'Beyond the North Wind') to Delos. The cults around them were generally specific to Delos, and some credit them with bringing worship of Artemis and Apollo to Delos, but some ancient sources dispute this. They are closely tied to the Hyperborean Offerings brought to Delos each year, as the origin myth of this tradition centred around their travel from Hyperborea to Delos. They are also closely tied with Olen (the mythical poet), as he is often cited as the composer of the hymns that were sung in worship of the various groups. There are three main groups: Opis, Loxo and Arge; Hyperoche and Laodice; Achaeia. (Note: In most ancient and modern sources, both Loxo and Achaeia are ignored as they are mentioned infrequently and lack archeological connections.) The generally accepted chronology is that Opis, Loxo and Arge arrived first, followed by Hyperoche and Laodice and the Achaeia, however this is unclear as several of the ancient sources contradict themselves. Two tombs were found in excavations of Delos that were attributed to the Hyperborean Maidens.

== Hyperborean Offering ==
It was believed that an offering was sent by the Hyperboreans to Delos each year. This belief is attested to by Herodotus. This changed slightly throughout time, but the central idea remained the same. Several sources attest that these offerings did arrive each year, and there have been several theories as to the sender of these offerings. Seltman claims that they came from a Greek-related group located on the Danube. Some argue, such as Robertson, that these offerings originally were for Athens, but when Athens gained control of Delos, spread the belief in these offerings. Robertson similarly argues that these offerings were dedicated to Demeter, as opposed to Apollo. Apollo is generally accepted as the God most associated with these offerings, however, as he is the God most associated with the Hyperboreans in general, and the mythological origin of these offerings are linked with him immensely. The following is the route of these offerings according to Herodotus:

"They say that offerings wrapt in wheat-straw are brought from the Hyperboreans to Scythia; when they have passed Scythia, each nation in turn receives them from its neighbours till they are carried to the Adriatic sea, which is the most westerly limit of their journey; thence they are brought on to the south, the people of Dodona being the first Greeks to receive them. From Dodona they come down to the Melian gulf, and are carried across to Euboea, and city sends them on to city till they come to Carystus; after this, Andros is left out of their journey, for it is Carystians who carry them to Tenos, and Tenians to Delos."

— Herodotus, Histories, Book 4 Chapter 33

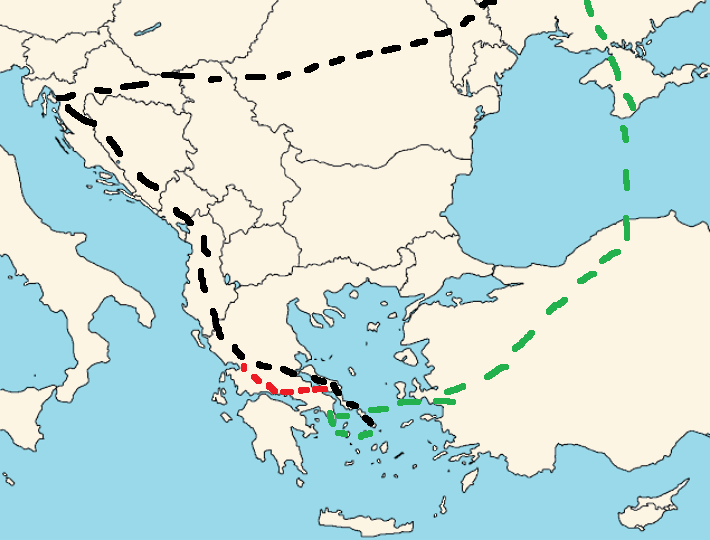
Portrays the route that the Hyperborean Offerings took to arrive at Delos, as described by the ancient writers. The following is the key: Herodotus claims the black route; Callimachus claims the red route; Pausanias claims the Green Route.

Callimachus says that:

"These first bring thee cornstalks and holy sheaves of corn-ears, which the Pelasgians of Dodona [...] far first receive, as these offerings enter their country from afar. Next they come to the Holy city [Delphi] and mountains of the Malian land; and thence they sail across to the goodly Lelantian plain of the Abantes; and then not long is the voyage from Euboea."

— Callimachus, Hymn to Delos, 283-290

However, Pausanias, writing later says that:

"The Hyperboreans are said to hand them over to the Arimaspi, the Arimaspi to the Issedones, from these the Scythians bring them to Sinope, thence they are carried by Greeks to Prasiae, and the Athenians take them to Delos."

— Pausanias, Description of Greece, 1.31.2

This change in the route suggests that the route changed significantly as time went on. between the 5th Century BCE and the 2nd Century CE. Also, it can be noted that throughout the sources, an emphasis is placed on the agricultural element of the gift, with the offerings being associated throughout the sources with agricultural produce, such as corn, wheat and fruit.

== Mythology ==
=== Hyperoche and Laodice ===
Hyperoche (Ancient Greek: Ὑπεροχη) and Laodice (Ancient Greek: Λαοδικη) were the first to bring offerings from Hyperborea to Delos. A direct translation of their names reveals some further meaning: Hyperoche means 'Above the chariot'; Laodice means 'Justice of the People'. (Note: Hyperoche can be split into the two words 'hyper'(above) and 'okhê'(chariot). Laodice is split into 'dikê'(justice) and 'laos'(people).)They came with 5 men as protection called the Perpherees (Note: These Perpherees are rarely discussed. They are named in Herodotus and we are told of honours given to them in Callimachus, but are not mentioned much beyond that. However, there are some more mention of specific notable Perpherees, such as Hyperochus and Laodicus.)(Ancient Greek: Περφερέες). They carried an offering to Eileithyia for the ease of childbearing. They, as well as their escorts, died in Delos. This led the Hyperboreans to stop sending people with the offerings, instead sending it through neighbouring kingdoms to be passed on to Delos.

=== Opis, Loxo and Arge ===
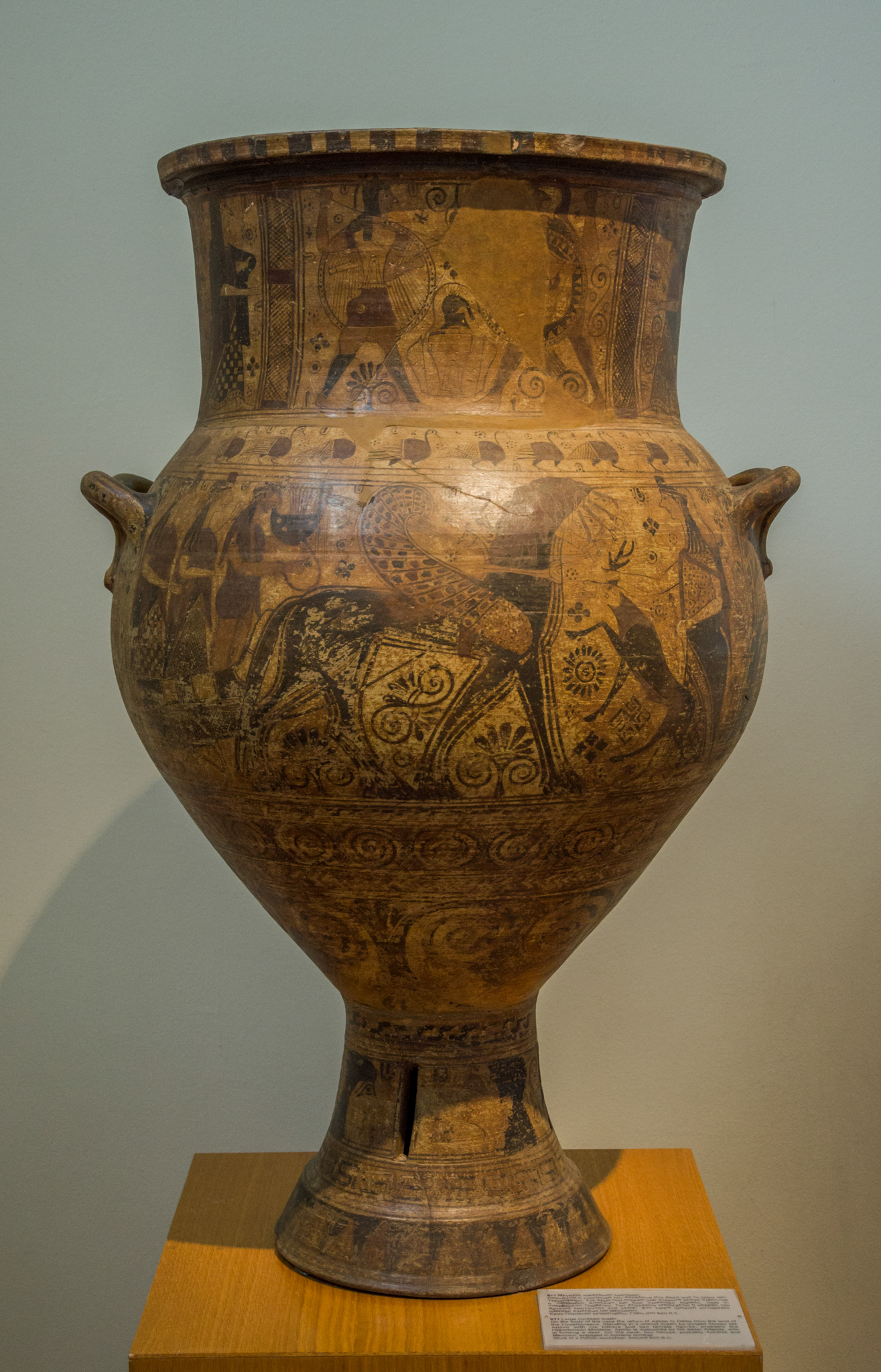
A Cycladic krater (Note: The term Cycladic refers to the detailed and highly sought after style. A Krater refers to a large two-handed vessel, used to mix wine with water.) It depicts the return of Apollo to Delos from Hyperborea. Standing in the chariot, alongside Apollo, are two female figures, believed to be two of the Hyperborean Maidens, perhaps Opis and Arge.

Opis (Ancient Greek: Ουπις), Loxo (Ancient Greek: Λοξο) and Arge (Ancient Greek: Ἑκαεργη) were the first Hyperboreans to travel to Delos. They were daughters of Boreas and were the most famous of the Hyperborean maidens. Each of their names corresponds to a part of archery: Opis represents aim; Loxo represents trajectory; Hekaerge (Arge) represents distancing. (Note: 'Opsis' means 'sighting', as in sighting a target. 'loxos' means 'slanting', as in slanting a shot. 'hekaergos' means striking from a distance.) There are some theories that these rose out of names for the attributes of Artemis, evidenced by Artemis having the surname Hecaerge or Loxo in some sources. They are credited with bringing worship of Artemis to Delos. They became handmaidens for Artemis, travelling with her in her hunt as shown by the mention of them in Nonnus' retelling of the death of Actaeon. Additionally, in Callimachus' Hymn to Delos, this group of three takes over the role given by Herodotus to Hyperoche and Laodice.

Opis and Arge (Note: Opis is sometimes given the name Upis, and Arge is sometimes given the names of Hekaerge, or Hecaërge. This article sticks to the names Opis and Arge.) are linked to the birth story of Apollo and Artemis. Herodotus claims that they came to Delos with the God's themselves. It is unclear who specifically this refers to, but it is generally accepted that this refers to Leto and Eileithyia, who came with the twins Apollo and Artemis in utero, to be born at Delos. This agrees with the version of the myth in which Hyperborean maidens nurse the infant Gods.This would also explain why their names are sometimes given as epithets for the Gods. Claudian mentions them as two of Diana's seven chiefs who accompany her: In the same text, Claudian marks out Opis as a charioteer. There are also some versions of the myth of the death of Orion, that make Opis by the subject of Orion attempting to force himself onto her, leading to Artemis killing him. Opis is also mentioned by Virgil as a virgin follower of Diana.

=== Achaeia ===
Achaeia (Ancient Greek: Αχαιιη) had a hymn dedicated to her by Olen, but it does not survive. All that has survived is that she arrived later than Opis and Hecaerge, travelling from Hyperborea to Delos. She is generally left out of most conversation about the Hyperborean Maidens. If directly translated, Achaeia simply means 'Greek Woman'. (Note: 'akhaiiê', or 'akhaia' means 'Greek Woman')

== Worship ==
The idea of a distinct group of 'hyperborean maidens' was not generally an actual mythological concept, but is more so a modern idea. Their worship was not interrupted by the Greek Dark Ages. There is evidence to suggest, at least at the time of Herodotus, that this referred to two distinct religious cults, although this is debated. It is also argued, at least by some, that the worship of the Hyperborean Maidens changed massively over time. Due to this, the next two paragraphs are what Herodotus tells us about the worship of the maidens. The two groups were worshipped in very different way at the time of Herodotus:

Opis and Arge were honoured in a variety of ways. Opis and Arge had a hymn sang about them. When thighbones were burnt in a sacrifice, the ashes were used for casting on the burial place of Opis and Arge. Women would gather gifts for them, although what exact gifts are not specified. It can be argued, however, that these gifts were likely agrarian. (Note: Agrarian meaning that they are related to farming or agriculture, such as food.) As mentioned previously, this pair is closely connected with Artemis, and the Hyperborean Offerings brought to Delos were agrarian in nature. Also, it is mentioned that people sang a hymn in worship of them, composed by Olen the Lycian.

Hyperoche and Laodice were honoured somewhat differently. Children would cut their hair in honour of them and before marriage, girls would cut off a tress and lay it on the tomb. The boys would wind some of their hair around a stalk and lay it on the tomb. These offerings take place when a person enters a new phase of sexual life, and mirroring this, they were associated with Eileithyia.

However, by Callimachus and the later Pausanias, Hyperoche and Laodice are no longer mentioned, and, as mentioned above, Opis and Arge seem to have taken on their role. Reflecting this, it is now mentioned that when getting married, girls would cut off some of their hair and offer it as an offering to Opis and Arge, while boys offer the first hairs of their beard to the young men that accompanied them.

William Sale argued that this signifies a religious change: The cults of Hyperoche and Laodice being merged with the cults of Opis and Arge, due to the decline of the worship of Eileithyia. This theory stems from the idea that in Herodotus, the earliest source, the pairs are treated very separately, with different worship, while in later sources they are merged under the name of Arge and Opis, and the idea that it cannot be assumed that the ancient writers were simply mistaken when they disagree. This is supported by a range of other archaeological evidence as well. This viewpoint is generally agreed with and cited as reliable by many modern sources.

This, however, is refuted by several scholars. Indeed, Noel Robertson argues that both cults were dedicated to fertility and childbirth. This view is shared by J. Younger. Picard, a renowned archaeologist, argues that the tombs belonged to a singular unified Mycenaean hero-cult that later fractured. Nilsson argued that the Hyperborean Maidens were simple harvest spirits whose identities multiplied over time. Rhode argues that the maidens are simply interchangeable literary doublets of each other, attached to ancient rituals.

=== Tombs ===
The tombs were the site of most, if not all worship in the religious cults. The respective tombs of the Hyperborean maidens have been subject to much discussion and excavation. Generally, the tomb of Opis and Arge is referred to as the 'theke', and the tomb of Hyperoche and Laodice as the 'sema'. (Note: This is due to the presence of human remains in the tomb of Opis and Arge, and the absence of human remains in the tomb of Hyperoche and Laodice. A theke (deriving from the verb 'tithemi' ("to put" or "to place")) is the physical container for human remains, while a sema (literally meaning a sign or mark) is a commemorative marker.) Both tombs have been found, and the location in which they are corresponds near exactly to the writings of Herodotus on the locations of the tombs.

The tomb of Hyperoche and Laodice was carved into a ground platform, and surrounded by a wall. In excavations, fragments of pottery from the 16th-15th Century BCE was found nearby. Two spindles were found at this tomb. (Note: This is of specific importance as it confirms the identity of the tomb - spindles were mentioned by Herodotus as being placed on the tomb as a form of worship of the pair.) The pottery ranged from Middle Minoan II (1875 to 1750 BCE) to Mycenaean (1550 to 1050 BCE) to some less archaic Corinthian (725 to 550 BCE) fragments. This tomb was in the Sanctuary of Artemis, at the foot of an olive tree on the left hand of the entrance to the temple of Artemis.

The tomb of Arge and Opis was a Mycenaean style of tomb, with a wide dromos. (Note: A 'dromos' is a long, often narrow, entrance passage that leads to a monumental structure, such as a tomb.) In Hellenistic times, it was surrounded by a wall, with a slab which is generally accepted to be the base of an altar in front of this wall. Human remains were found here in excavations. 2 Cycladic (3200 to 2000 BCE) and 3 Mycenaen pottery was found here. This tomb was behind the temple of Artemis, looking eastwards, near the refectory of the people of Ceos, as attested by Herodotus.

==== The Athenian Purification of Delos ====
Over the course of Delian history, under the control of Athens, there were several purifications of the island. This aimed to cleanse the island, making it fit for worship of the Gods. In the sixth century BCE, Pisistratus, an Athenian tyrant, ordered that all graves within sight of the temple of Apollo be dug up and moved. In the fifth century BCE, the Athenians purged the entire island of all graves and dead bodies, and a decree was instituted so that no one would be allowed to be buried or give birth on the island. (Note: This was due to a command given by the Oracle of Delphi, to avoid a massive plague. At this time, Athens was in the sixth year of the Peloponnesian war.)

Interestingly, the only tombs to have been spared from this purification were the two tombs of the Hyperborean Maidens. This is generally attributed to the existence of a hero-cult(s) around the two tombs. This also shows that this cult was of particular religious importance - the Athenians disobeyed a direct order from the Delphic oracle by sparing the two tombs.

== Sources ==
Herodotus is the most detailed ancient literary source concerning the Hyperborean Maidens. This details the basic myth of Hyperoche and Laodice, and how they were worshiped. This is the most detailed account of the myth of Opis and Arge, and details how they were worshiped as well. He also gives us the locations of both tombs. He also gives a suggested route by which the Hyperborean Offerings arrived in Delos.

Callimachus is the second most detailed literary source, giving a suggested route of the offerings, and gives a way in which Opis, Loxo and Arge are worshipped. Callimachus is the first, and one of only two sources to mention Loxo. He is also the only writer that describes the trio as being daughters of Boreas.

Pausanias mentions the maidens several times in passing, citing their worship as common knowledge. He is also the only surviving source to mention Achaeia. He also gives a route in which the Hyperborean Offerings made their way to Delos, which differed massively to Herodotus' route, as shown above.

There are several other ancient sources which mention the maidens in passing, with Opis as the most popular figure between them.

The tombs of both of the main pairs of maidens (Hyperoche and Laodice; Arge and Opis) have been found and excavated, bringing a variety of archaeological knowledge from that. Excluding that, however, other archaeological artefacts relating to the maidens are scarce.

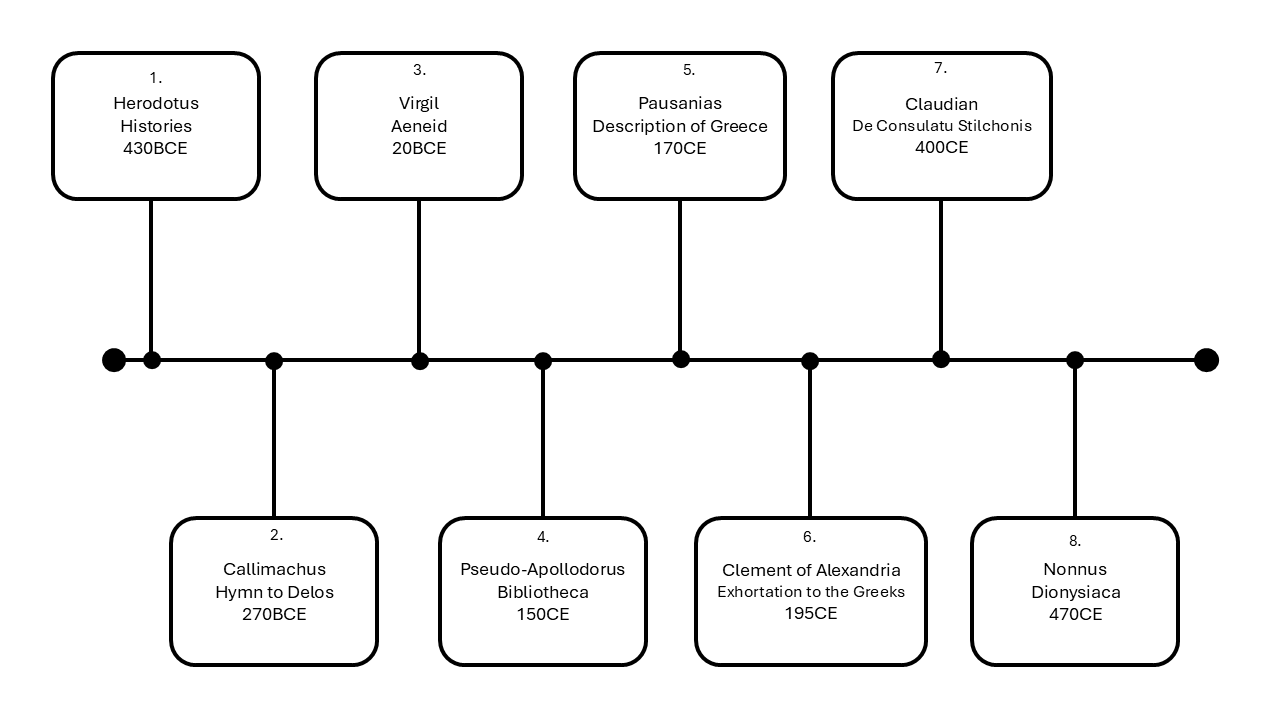
A Timeline of each of the ancient sources that mention/ discuss the Hyperborean Maidens. This is a graphical representation of that on the left.

This is the list of ancient sources and their rough dates, to gain an idea of the chronology:

- Herodotus - Histories - 430BCE
- Callimachus - Hymn to Delos - 270BCE
- Virgil - Aeneid - 20BCE
- Pseudo-Apollodorus - Bibliotheca - 150CE
- Pausanias - Description of Greece - 170CE
- Clement of Alexandria - Exhortation to the Greeks- 195CE
- Claudian - De Consulatu Stillchonis - 400CE
- Nonnus - Dionysiaca - 470CE

=== Olen the Lycian ===
Olen the Lycian was a mythical poet, who was believed to have composed many hymns for the Delians, on various matters. It is not generally believed that he existed, and none of his work survives, only ancient sources recording the existence of his hymns. In ancient times, he was credited with the introduction of worship of Apollo and Artemis to Delos, invention of epic meter, and being the first prophet of Apollo. Many ancient sources (Note: Herodotus, Callimachus and Pausanias.) refer to his hymns still being sung and used at the time of them writing.

Herodotus claims that Olen had composed a hymn in honour of Arge and Opis, which was sung in worship of the pair. He also mentions that Olen also made the other ancient hymns sang at Delos. Pausanias also claims that Olen had composed a hymn to Achaeia, saying that she had come from Hyperborea to Delos; Pausanias credits Melanopus of Cyme (Note: Melanopus of Cyme was a poet from the mythical age, dated to after Olen. His work is rarely mentioned, and none survives today. In some ancient genealogies, Melanopus is citied as the grandfather of Homer.) with a hymn to Opis and Arge, disagreeing with Herodotus' attribution to Olen.
