= Belida =

Scientific classification
- Kingdom: Animalia
- Phylum: Arthropoda
- Class: Insecta
- Order: Diptera
- Family: Tachinidae
- Subfamily: Exoristinae
- Tribe: Blondeliini
- Genus: Belida; Robineau-Desvoidy, 1863

Type species
- Belida flavipalpis Robineau-Desvoidy, 1863

Synonyms
- Aporotachina Meade, 1894; Aulicomyia Reinhard, 1943; Neothelaira Townsend, 1912

Genus of flies

Belida is a genus of flies in the family Tachinidae.

== Species ==
- Belida angelicae (Meigen, 1824)
- Belida chaetoneura (Coquillett, 1897)
- Belida dexina (Townsend, 1912)
- Belida latifrons (Jacentkovský, 1944)
- Belida longicornis Shima, 1979
- Belida pusilla (Reinhard, 1953)
