= Hyperborea =

Mythical northern region in Greek mythology

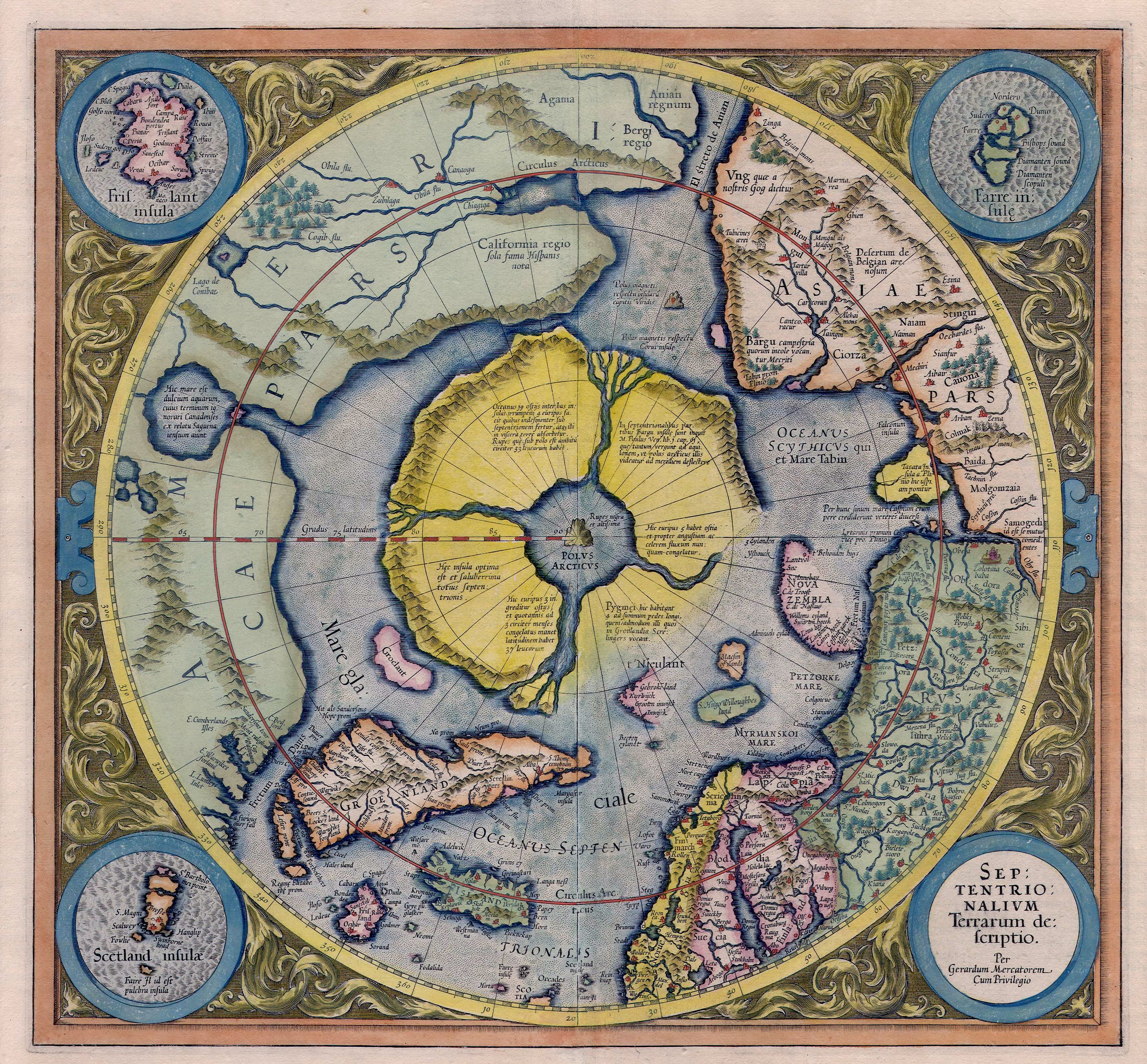
An arctic continent on the Gerardus Mercator map of 1595.

In Greek mythology, the Hyperboreans (Ancient Greek: ὑπερβόρε(ι)οι, romanized: hyperbóre(i)oi, pronounced [hyperbóre(ː)oi̯]; Latin: Hyperborei) were a mythical people who lived in the far northern part of the known world. Their name appears to derive from the Greek ὑπέρ Βορέᾱ, "beyond Boreas" (the god of the north wind). Some scholars prefer a derivation from ὑπερφέρω (hyperpherō, "to carry over").

Despite their location in an otherwise frigid part of the world, the Hyperboreans were believed to inhabit a sunny, temperate, and divinely blessed land. In many versions of the story, they lived north of the Riphean Mountains, which shielded them from the effects of the cold north wind. The oldest myths portray them as the favorites of Apollo, and some ancient Greek writers regarded the Hyperboreans as the mythical founders of Apollo's shrines at Delos and Delphi.

Later writers disagreed on the existence and location of the Hyperboreans, with some regarding them as purely mythological, and others connecting them to real-world peoples and places in northern Eurasia (e.g. Britain, Scandinavia, or Siberia). In medieval and Renaissance literature, the Hyperboreans came to signify remoteness and exoticism. Modern scholars consider the Hyperborean myth to be an amalgam of ideas from ancient utopianism, "edge of the earth" stories, the cult of Apollo, and exaggerated reports of phenomena in northern Europe (e.g. the Arctic "midnight sun").

Greeks initially used the term Hyperborei Montes to denote a mythical mountain range in the far north, associated with the Hyperborea, but later ancient geographers applied it to actual mountain ranges, including the Caucasus, the Ural Mountains and the Rhipaei Montes.

== Early sources ==
=== Herodotus ===
The earliest extant source that mentions Hyperborea in detail, Herodotus' Histories (Book IV, Chapters 32–36), dates from c. 450 BC. Herodotus recorded three earlier sources that supposedly mentioned the Hyperboreans, including Hesiod and Homer, the latter purportedly having written of Hyperborea in his lost work Epigoni. Herodotus voices doubts as to the attribution of the work to Homer.

Herodotus wrote that the 7th-century BC poet Aristeas wrote of the Hyperboreans in a poem (now lost) called Arimaspea about a journey to the Issedones, who are estimated to have lived in the Kazakh Steppe. Beyond these lived the one-eyed Arimaspians, further on the gold-guarding griffins, and beyond these the Hyperboreans. Herodotus assumed that Hyperborea lay somewhere in Northeast Asia.

Pindar, lyric poet from Thebes and a contemporary of Herodotus in the tenth Pythian Ode described the Hyperboreans and tells of Perseus's journey to them.

Other 5th-century BC Greek authors, such as Simonides of Ceos and Hellanicus of Lesbos, described or referenced the Hyperboreans in their works.

=== Location ===
The Hyperboreans were believed to live beyond the snowy Riphean Mountains, with Pausanias describing the location as "The land of the Hyperboreans, men living beyond the home of Boreas." Homer placed Boreas in Thrace, and therefore Hyperborea was in his opinion north of Thrace, in Dacia. Sophocles (Antigone, 980–987), Aeschylus (Agamemnon, 193; 651), Simonides of Ceos (Schol. on Apollonius Rhodius, 1. 121) and Callimachus (Delian, [IV] 65) also placed Boreas in Thrace.

Other ancient writers believed the home of Boreas or the Riphean Mountains were in a different location. For example, Hecataeus of Miletus believed that the Riphean Mountains were adjacent to the Black Sea. Alternatively, Pindar placed the home of Boreas, the Riphean Mountains and Hyperborea all near the Danube.

Heraclides Ponticus and Antimachus in contrast identified the Riphean Mountains with the Alps, and the Hyperboreans as a Celtic tribe (perhaps the Helvetii) who lived just beyond them. Aristotle placed the Riphean mountains on the borders of Scythia, and Hyperborea further north. Hecataeus of Abdera and others believed Hyperborea was Britain.

Later Roman and Greek sources continued to change the location of the Riphean mountains, the home of Boreas, as well as Hyperborea, supposedly located beyond them. However, all these sources agreed these were all in the far north of Greece or southern Europe. The ancient grammarian Simmias of Rhodes in the 3rd century BC connected the Hyperboreans to the Massagetae and Posidonius in the 1st century BC to the Western Celts, but Pomponius Mela placed them even further north in the vicinity of the Arctic.

In maps based on reference points and descriptions given by Strabo, Hyperborea, shown variously as a peninsula or island, is located beyond what is now France, and stretches further north–south than east–west. Other descriptions put it in the general area of the Ural Mountains.

=== Later classical sources ===
Plutarch, writing in the 1st century AD, mentions Heraclides of Ponticus, who connected the Hyperboreans with the Gauls who had sacked Rome in the 4th century BC (see Battle of the Allia).

Aelian, Diodorus Siculus and Stephen of Byzantium all recorded important ancient Greek sources on Hyperborea, but added no new descriptions.

The 2nd-century AD Stoic philosopher Hierocles equated the Hyperboreans with the Scythians, and the Riphean Mountains with the Ural Mountains. Clement of Alexandria and other early Christian writers also made this same Scythian equation.

=== Ancient identification with Britain ===
Hyperborea was identified with Britain first by Hecataeus of Abdera in the 4th century BC, as in a preserved fragment by Diodorus Siculus:

In the regions beyond the land of the Celts there lies in the ocean an island no smaller than Sicily. This island, the account continues, is situated in the north and is inhabited by the Hyperboreans, who are called by that name because their home is beyond the point whence the north wind (Boreas) blows; and the island is both fertile and productive of every crop, and has an unusually temperate climate.

Hecateaus of Abdera also wrote that the Hyperboreans had on their island "a magnificent sacred precinct of Apollo and a notable temple which is adorned with many votive offerings and is spherical in shape". Some scholars have identified this temple with Stonehenge. (Note: Squire's claim that Diodorus locates this temple "in the centre of Britain" is unfounded.) Diodorus, however, does not identify Hyperborea with Britain, and his description of Britain (5.21–23) makes no mention of the Hyperboreans or their spherical temple.

Pseudo-Scymnus, around 90 BC, wrote that Boreas dwelled at the extremity of Gaulish territory, and that he had a pillar erected in his name on the edge of the sea (Periegesis, 183). Some have claimed this is a geographical reference to northern France, and Hyperborea as the British Isles which lay just beyond the English Channel.

Ptolemy (Geographia, 2. 21) and Marcian of Heraclea (Periplus, 2. 42) both placed Hyperborea in the North Sea which they called the "Hyperborean Ocean".

In his 1726 work on the druids, John Toland specifically identified Diodorus' Hyperborea with the Isle of Lewis, and the spherical temple with the Callanish Stones.

== Legends ==
Along with Thule, Hyperborea was one of several terrae incognitae to the Greeks and Romans, where Pliny, Pindar and Herodotus, as well as Virgil and Cicero, reported that people lived to the age of one thousand and enjoyed lives of complete happiness. Hecataeus of Abdera collated all the stories about the Hyperboreans current in the 4th century BC and published a lengthy, now-lost treatise on them that was noted by Diodorus Siculus (ii.47.1–2). Legend told that the sun was supposed to rise and set only once a year in Hyperborea, which would place it above or upon the Arctic Circle, or, more generally, in the arctic polar regions.

The ancient Greek writer Theopompus, in his work Philippica, claimed Hyperborea was once planned to be conquered by a large race of soldiers from another island; however, this plan was apparently abandoned, as the soldiers from Meropis realized the Hyperboreans were too strong, and too blessed, for them to be conquered. This unusual tale, which some believe was satire or comedy, was preserved by Aelian (Varia Historia, 3. 18).

Theseus visited the Hyperboreans and Pindar transferred Perseus' encounter with Medusa there from its traditional site in Libya, to the dissatisfaction of his Alexandrian editors.

Apollonius wrote that the Argonauts sighted Hyperborea, when they sailed through Eridanos.

=== Hyperboreans in Delos ===
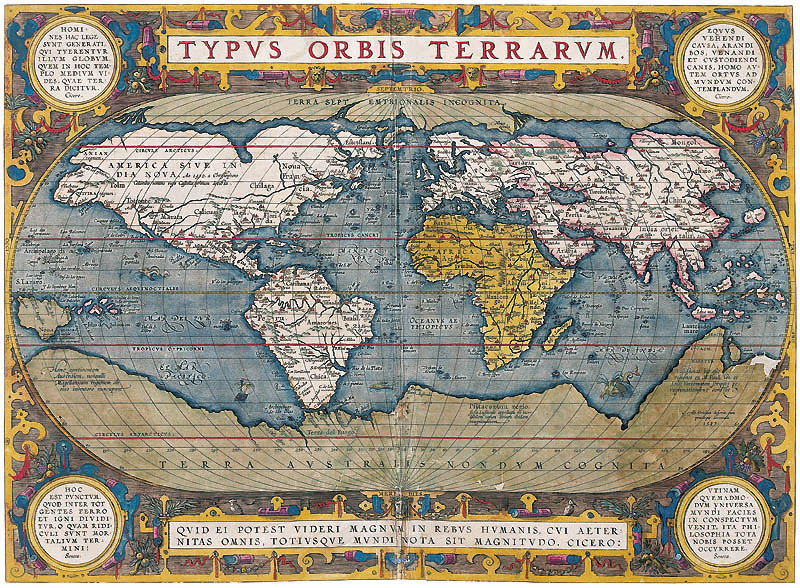
On this 1570 map, Hyperborea is shown as an Arctic continent and described as Terra Septemtrionalis Incognita (transl. Unknown Northern Land). Notice the similarities in the continent to that of Mercator's map above.

Alone among the Twelve Olympians, the Greeks venerated Apollo among the Hyperboreans, and the god was thought to spend his winters there amongst them.

According to Herodotus, offerings from the Hyperboreans came to Scythia packed with straw, and they were passed from tribe to tribe until they arrived at Dodona and from them to other Greek peoples until they to came to Apollo's temple on Delos. He said they used this method because the first time the gifts were brought by two maidens, Hyperoche and Laodice, with an escort of five men, but none of them returned. To prevent this, the Hyperboreans began to bring the gifts to their borders and ask their neighbours to deliver them to the next country and so on until they arrived to Delos.

Herodotus also details that two other virgin maidens, Arge and Opis, had come from Hyperborea to Delos before, as a tribute to the goddess Ilithyia for ease of child-bearing, accompanied by the gods themselves. The maidens received honours in Delos, where the women collected gifts from them and sang hymns to them. Combined, these maidens are referred to as the Hyperborean Maidens.

=== Abaris the Hyperborean ===
A particular Hyperborean legendary healer was known as "Abaris" or "Abaris the Healer" whom Herodotus first described in his works. Plato (Charmides, 158C) regarded Abaris as a physician from the far north, while Strabo reported Abaris was Scythian like the early philosopher Anacharsis (Geographica, 7. 3. 8).

=== Physical appearance ===
Greek legend asserts that the Boreades, who were the descendants of Boreas and Chione, founded the first theocratic monarchy on Hyperborea. This legend is found preserved in the writings of Aelian:

This god [Apollo] has as priests the sons of Boreas and Chione, three in number, brothers by birth, and six cubits in height [about 2.7 metres].

Diodorus Siculus added to this account:

And the kings of this (Hyperborean) city and the supervisors of the sacred precinct are called Boreadae, since they are descendants of Boreas, and the succession to these positions is always kept in their family.

The Boreades were thus believed to be giant kings, around 10 feet (3.0 m) tall, who ruled Hyperborea. No other physical descriptions of the Hyperboreans are provided in classical sources. However, Aelius Herodianus, a grammarian in the 3rd century, wrote that the mythical Arimaspi were identical to the Hyperboreans in physical appearance (De Prosodia Catholica, 1. 114) and Stephanus of Byzantium in the 6th century wrote the same (Ethnica, 118. 16). The ancient poet Callimachus described the Arimaspi as having fair hair, but it is disputed whether the Arimaspi were Hyperboreans. According to Herodianus, the Arimaspi were close in appearance to the Hyperboreans, making the inference that the Hyperboreans had fair hair being potentially valid.

=== Celts as Hyperboreans ===
Six classical Greek authors also came to identify the Hyperboreans with their Celtic neighbours in the north: Antimachus of Colophon, Protarchus, Heraclides Ponticus, Hecataeus of Abdera, Apollonius of Rhodes and Posidonius of Apamea. The way the Greeks understood their relationship with non-Greek peoples was significantly moulded by the way myths of the Golden Age were transplanted into the contemporary scene, especially in the context of Greek colonisation and trade.

As the Riphean mountains of the mythical past were identified with the Alps of northern Italy, there was at least a geographic rationale for identifying the Hyperboreans with the Celts living in and beyond the Alps, or at least the Hyperborean lands with the lands inhabited by the Celts. A reputation for feasting and a love of gold may have reinforced the connection.

== Common identifications ==
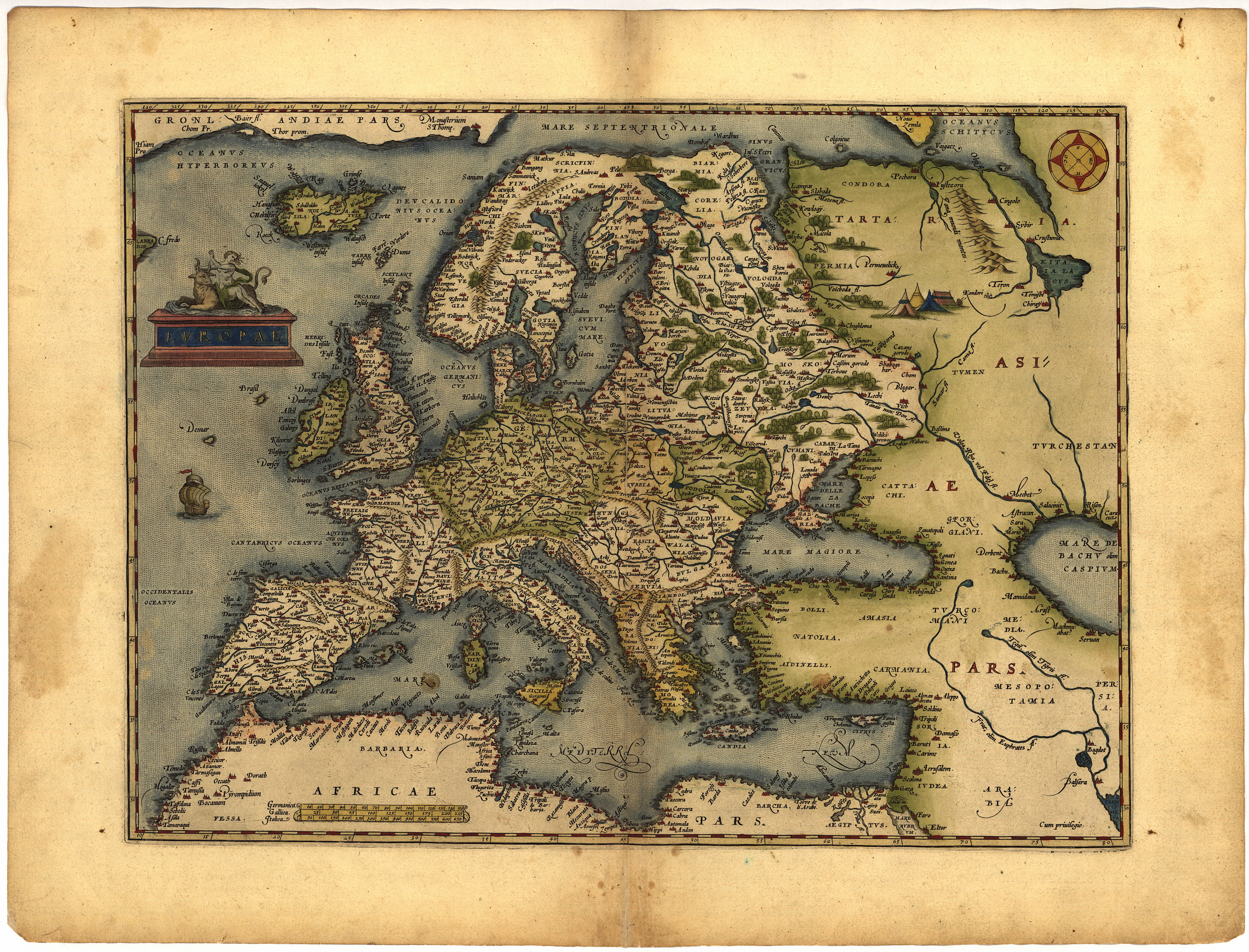
A map by Abraham Ortelius, Amsterdam 1572: at the top left Oceanvs Hyperborevs separates Iceland from Greenland

Northern Europeans (Scandinavians), when confronted with the classical Greco-Roman culture of the Mediterranean, identified themselves with the Hyperboreans. This aligns with the traditional aspect of a perpetually sunny land beyond the north, since the Northern half of Scandinavia faces long days during high summer with no hour of darkness ('midnight sun'). This idea was especially strong during the 17th century in Sweden, where the later representatives of the ideology of Gothicism declared the Scandinavian peninsula both the lost Atlantis and the Hyperborean land.

Northern regions and their inhabitants have been called "Hyperborean", without claims of descent from the mythological Hyperboreans. In this vein, the self-described "Hyperborean-Roman Company" (Hyperboreisch-römische Gesellschaft) were a group of northern European scholars who studied classical ruins in Rome, founded in 1824 by Theodor Panofka, Otto Magnus von Stackelberg, August Kestner and Eduard Gerhard. In this sense, Washington Irving, in elaborating on the Astor Expedition in the Pacific Northwest, described how:

While the fiery and magnificent Spaniard, inflamed with the mania for gold, has extended his discoveries and conquests over those brilliant countries scorched by the ardent sun of the tropics, the adroit and buoyant Frenchman, and the cool and calculating Briton, have pursued the less splendid, but no less lucrative, traffic in furs amidst the Hyperborean regions of the Canadas, until they have advanced even within the Arctic Circle.

The term "Hyperborean" still sees some jocular contemporary use in reference to groups of people who live in a cold climate. Under the Library of Congress Classification System, the letter subclass PM includes "Hyperborean Languages", a catch-all category that refers to all the linguistically unrelated languages of peoples living in Arctic regions, such as the Inuit.

Hyperborean has also been used in a metaphorical sense, to describe a sense of distance from the ordinary. In this way, Friedrich Nietzsche referred to his sympathetic readers as Hyperboreans in The Antichrist (written 1888, published 1895): "Let us look each other in the face. We are Hyperboreans – we know well enough how remote our place is." He quoted Pindar and added "Beyond the North, beyond the ice, beyond death – our life, our happiness."

== Modern esoterica ==
Helena Blavatsky, René Guénon and Julius Evola all wrote about a belief in the Hyperborean, polar origins of mankind and a subsequent solidification and devolution. Blavatsky describes the Hyperboreans as the origin of the second "root race" and as non-intelligent ethereal creatures that reproduced by budding.

According to these esotericists, the Hyperborean people represented the Golden Age polar center of civilization and spirituality, with mankind, instead of evolving from a common ape ancestor, progressively devolving into an apelike state as a result of straying, both physically and spiritually, from its mystical otherworldly homeland in the Far North, succumbing to the "demonic" energies of the South Pole, the greatest point of materialization.

In 1974 Robert Charroux first related the Hyperboreans to an ancient astronaut race. Miguel Serrano was influenced by Charroux's writings on the Hyperboreans.

Aleksandr Dugin has "touted ancient legends about the sunken city of Atlantis and the mythical civilisation Hyperborea" in defense of his vision of a vast Russian Empire. "He believes Russia is the modern-day reincarnation of the ancient 'Hyperboreans', who need to stand at odds with the modern-day 'Atlanteans', the United States".

In August 2021, a report published by the Institute for Strategic Dialogue highlighted increased content promoting Hyperborea on the social networking site TikTok. The report indicated that hyperborean imagery and symbology is increasingly being used as a form of Esoteric Nazism by neo-Nazi TikTok users.

== Modern research ==
=== North Asian/Chinese hypothesis ===
Since Herodotus places the Hyperboreans beyond the Massagetae and Issedones, both Central Asian peoples, it appears that his Hyperboreans may have lived in Siberia. Heracles sought the golden-antlered hind of Artemis in Hyperborea. As the reindeer is the only deer species of which females bear antlers, this would suggest an arctic or subarctic region. Following J. D. P. Bolton's location of the Issedones on the south-western slopes of the Altay Mountains, Carl P. Ruck placed Hyperborea beyond the Dzungarian Gate into northern Xinjiang, noting that the Hyperboreans were probably Chinese.

=== Indo-European hypothesis ===
John G. Bennett wrote a research paper entitled "The Hyperborean Origin of the Indo-European Culture" (Journal Systematics, Vol. 1, No. 3, December 1963) in which he claimed the Indo-European homeland was in the far north, which he considered the Hyperborea of classical antiquity. This idea was earlier proposed by Bal Gangadhar Tilak (whom Bennett credits) in his The Arctic Home in the Vedas (1903) as well as the Austro-Hungarian ethnologist Karl Penka (Origins of the Aryans, 1883).

Soviet Indologist Natalia R. Guseva and Soviet ethnographer S. V. Zharnikova, influenced by Tilak's The Arctic Home in the Vedas, argued for Hyperborea as the Arctic Urals homeland of the Indo-Aryan and Slavic people. Their ideas were popularized by Russian nationalists.

=== Bronze Age hypothesis ===
The archaeologists Kristian Kristiansen and Thomas B. Larsson have argued that accounts of Hyperborea and its associated myths represent "a mythological relict" from the Bronze Age:

The Delphic Apollo had strong northern links with the solar deity of the Baltic, from where amber came. He travelled on his white swans to the Hyperborean of the cold North during winter. This is a mythological relict of the economic role of the central and northern European periphery during the Bronze Age. On numerous metal items swans carried the sun, materialising the common myth of the sun-god, which according to Herodotus (IV, 32-6) was brought to Delos by Hyperborean maidens in at least two missions.

The historian Timothy P. Bridgman similarly suggests that "The Hyperborean gift route may constitute a hazy memory of Mycenaean trade routes and dealings with northern peoples."

Archaeological evidence for Greek contacts with the north in the Bronze Age includes amber from the Baltic, amber necklaces from Britain, and chariot equipment from the Steppe or Carpathian Basin found in the elite Shaft Graves at Mycenae, and Baltic amber found in the sanctuaries at Delphi and on Delos.

In 1924 the tombs associated with the Hyperborean maidens in Delos (Hyperoche, Laodice, Opis and Arge) were identified "in the very places described by Herodotus" and exacavated by French archaeologists Charles Picard and Joseph Replat. Both pairs of tombs were found to date from the Bronze Age and contained Cycladic, Minoan and Mycenaean pottery dating from the period 1875–1420 BC (equivalent to Middle Minoan II to Late Minoan II). A 'primitive cult' was apparently attached to the tombs in the Cycladic and Mycenaean age.

== See also ==
- 1309 Hyperborea
- Agartha
- Arcadia (utopia)
- Fortunate Isles
- Hyborian Age
- Hyperborean cycle
- Meropis
- Mythical place
- Oponskoye Kingdom
- Patagons
- Pytheas
- Sinbad and the Eye of the Tiger
- Thule

== Sources ==
Portions of this article were formerly excerpted from the public domain Lemprière's Classical Dictionary, 1848.

- Bridgman, Timothy P. (2005), Hyperboreans. Myth and history in Celtic-Hellenic contacts, Studies in Classics, New York and London: Routledge, ISBN 0-415-96978-6
- Diodorus Siculus, "Book II", Bibliotheca historica, archived from the original on 12 April 2023 – via Bill Thayer's Web Site
- Pauly, August; et al. (1914), "Hyperboreer", Realencyclopädie der classischen Altertumswissenschaft, Band IX (in German), vol. 17 (Hyaia-Imperator)
- Romm, James S. (1992), The Edges of the Earth in Ancient Thought, Princeton, New Jersey: Princeton University Press, ISBN 978-0-691-06933-3
- Shnirelman, Victor (2007), "Archaeology, Russian Nationalism, and the "Arctic Homeland"" (PDF), in Kohl, P. L.; Kozelsky, M.; Ben-Yehuda, N. (eds.), Selective Remembrances: Archaeology in the Construction, Commemoration, and Consecration of National Pasts, University of Chicago Press, archived (PDF) from the original on 23 April 2021
