= 184 Dejopeja =

M-type main-belt asteroid

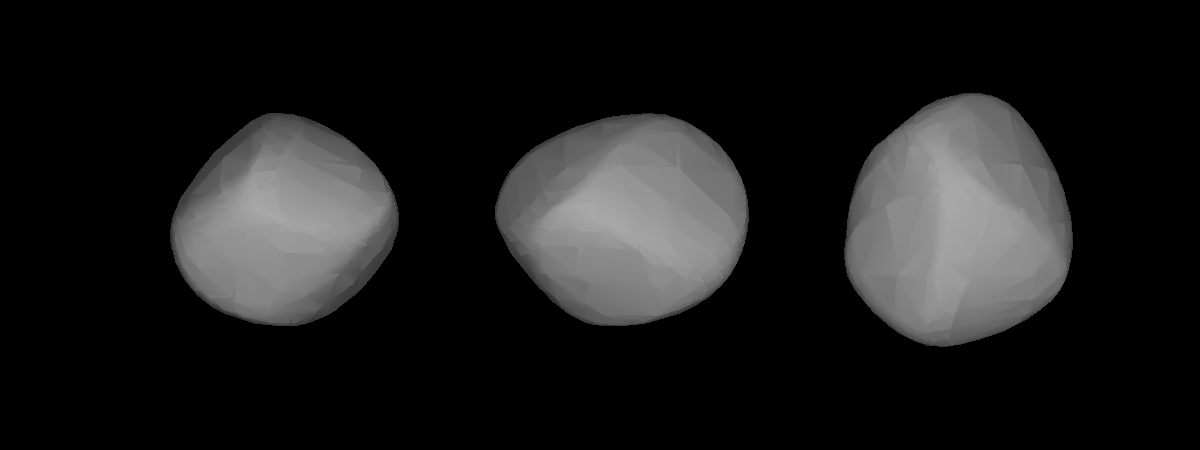
- A three-dimensional model of 184 Dejopeja based on its lightcurve

Discovery
- Discovered by: J. Palisa, 1878
- Discovery date: 28 February 1878

Designations
- Pronunciation: /diːoʊˈpiːə/
- Named after: Deiopea
- Alternative designations: A878 DA; 1903 QB; 1959 LL
- Minor planet category: Main belt

Orbital characteristics
- Epoch 31 July 2016 (JD 2457600.5)
- Uncertainty parameter 0
- Observation arc: 123.52 yr (45117 d)
- Aphelion: 3.4005 AU (508.71 Gm)
- Perihelion: 2.9741 AU (444.92 Gm)
- Semi-major axis: 3.1873 AU (476.81 Gm)
- Eccentricity: 0.066883
- Orbital period (sidereal): 5.69 yr (2078.4 d)
- Mean anomaly: 119.18°
- Mean motion: 0° 10^{m} 23.556^{s} / day
- Inclination: 1.1437°
- Longitude of ascending node: 331.61°
- Argument of perihelion: 209.72°
- Earth MOID: 1.97613 AU (295.625 Gm)
- Jupiter MOID: 1.56558 AU (234.207 Gm)
- T_{Jupiter}: 3.194

Physical characteristics
- Mean diameter: 93 ± 9 km (pole solution 1); 95 ± 9 km (pole solution 2)
- Mass: (8.4±2.5)×10^{17} kg (Note: Calculated from its standard gravitational parameter GM = 0.056±0.017 km^{3}/s^{2}.)
- Mean density: 2.96–3.16 g/cm^{3} (calculated)
- Synodic rotation period: 6.44111 h (0.268380 d)
- Pole ecliptic longitude: 200° or 18°
- Pole ecliptic latitude: 52° or 54°
- Geometric albedo: 0.1897±0.012
- Spectral type: M
- Absolute magnitude (H): 8.31

184 Dejopeja is a large M-type Main belt asteroid. It was discovered by Johann Palisa on February 28, 1878, and was named after Deiopea, a Roman nymph.

This is an X-type asteroid with a diameter of 66 km and a geometric albedo of 0.190. Based upon Photometric observations taken during 2000, it has a synodic rotation period of 6.441 ± 0.001 h. The light curve is tri-modal, most likely due to an angular shape, with a peak-to-peak amplitude of 0.19 ± 0.01 in magnitude.
