= Belida latifrons =

Scientific classification
- Kingdom: Animalia
- Phylum: Arthropoda
- Class: Insecta
- Order: Diptera
- Family: Tachinidae
- Subfamily: Exoristinae
- Tribe: Blondeliini
- Genus: Belida
- Species: B. latifrons

Binomial name
- Belida latifrons (Jacentkovský, 1944)

Synonyms
- Aporotachina latifrons Jacentkovský, 1944

Species of fly

Belida latifrons is a species of fly in the family Tachinidae.

== Distribution ==
Czech Republic, Poland, Greece, Russia.
