= Upis (mythology) =

Hyperborean maiden

In Greek and Roman mythology, Upis (Ancient Greek: Οὖπις, romanized: Oûpis) or Opis (Ancient Greek: Ὦπις, romanized: Ôpis) is a maiden from Hyperborea, a daughter of the wind-god Boreas. Upis along with her sisters descended from Hyperborea and went to the island of Delos, where they became handmaidens to the goddess Artemis.

== Family ==
Upis was a daughter of Boreas, the god of the north wind, by an unnamed mother. She had several brothers and sisters.

== Mythology ==
The virgin Upis along with her sisters (Arge, Hekaerge, and Loxo depending on the author) were the first to leave Hyperborea and arrive in Delos along with the Delian gods, Artemis and Apollo, before Hyperoche and Laodice did, who carried the offering that had been promised to the childbirth-goddess Eileithyia for the birth of the twins. Upis and the others introduced the worship of Apollo and Artemis, and thus received great honours from the Delians. The women of Delos would sing hymns to their honour and lavish them with gifts until the end of their lives.

Upis often accompanied Artemis in her various excursions amidst the woods; she was present when the hunter Actaeon accidentally stumbled on Artemis and the other maidens bathing nude and was transformed into a deer for his grave transgression. Some other time, the giant Orion joined Artemis as a hunting companion, and then he raped Upis, so Artemis shot him dead with her arrows in punishment. In the Aeneid meanwhile, Upis is ordered by Artemis to avenge the death of one of her favourites, the Amazon-like warrior Camilla, who was felled in battle by the Etruscan Arruns. Upis witnessed and lamented the death of Camilla, and then proceeded to slay Arruns with an arrow as directed by Artemis.

Upis was also said to be the name of a mythical being that reared the young Artemis, and might be identified with Boreas' daughter. In connection to that, Cicero speaks of a male Upis who became the father of the "third" Artemis/Diana.

== Cult ==
Upis' tomb in Delos was worshiped in cult, where the ashes of the burnt thighbones were cast after the sacrifice. Furthermore young girls would offer a lock from their hair as offering to her, while the boys offered the hair growing on their cheeks. The Delian cult, which seems to have included several deities connected to Artemis and childbirth (such as Eileithyia) likely went as far back as the Archaic period.

Upis seems to have been an aspect of Artemis herself, or at least a goddess with similar functions that was associated with her. In Ephesus, 'Upis' was also an epithet under which Artemis was worshipped as a goddess of childbirth.

Orion's sexual assault of Upis might be depicted on an ancient tomb relief frieze in Taranto, dating circa to 300 BC.

== See also ==
- Callisto
- Nicippe
- Rhodopis and Euthynicus

== Bibliography ==
- Apollodorus, The Library with an English Translation by Sir James George Frazer, F.B.A., F.R.S. in 2 Volumes, Cambridge, MA, Harvard University Press; London, William Heinemann Ltd. 1921. ISBN 0-674-99135-4. Online version at the Perseus Digital Library.
- Bell, Robert E. (1991). Women of Classical Mythology: A Biographical Dictionary. ABC-Clio. ISBN 9780874365818.
- Callimachus, Hymns in Callimachus and Lycophron with an English translation by A. W. Mair; Aratus, with an English translation by G. R. Mair, London: W. Heinemann, New York: G. P. Putnam 1921 . Online text available at the Internet Archive.
- Cicero, Nature of the Gods from the Treatises of M.T. Cicero translated by Charles Duke Yonge (1812–1891), Bohn edition of 1878. Online version at the Topos Text Project.
- Grimal, Pierre (1987). The Dictionary of Classical Mythology. Wiley-Blackwell. ISBN 0-631-13209-0.
- Herodotus, The Histories with an English translation by A. D. Godley. Cambridge. Harvard University Press. 1920. ISBN 0-674-99133-8. Online version available at Perseus Digital Library.
- March, Jennifer R. (May 31, 2014). Dictionary of Classical Mythology. Oxbow Books. ISBN 978-1-78297-635-6.* Nonnus, Dionysiaca; translated by Rouse, W H D, III Books XXXVI-XLVIII. Loeb Classical Library No. 346, Cambridge, Massachusetts, Harvard University Press; London, William Heinemann Ltd. 1940. Internet Archive.
- Pausanias, Description of Greece with an English Translation by W.H.S. Jones, Litt.D., and H.A. Ormerod, M.A., in 4 Volumes. Cambridge, MA, Harvard University Press; London, William Heinemann Ltd. 1918. ISBN 0-674-99328-4. Online version at the Perseus Digital Library
- Smith, William (1873). A Dictionary of Greek and Roman Biography and Mythology. London, UK: John Murray, printed by Spottiswoode and Co. Online version at the Perseus.tufts library.
- Tripp, Edward (June 1970). Crowell's Handbook of Classical Mythology (1st ed.). Thomas Y. Crowell Co. ISBN 069022608X.
- Virgil, the Aeneid, with an English translation by Theodore C. Williams. trans. Boston. Houghton Mifflin Co. 1910. Online version at the Perseus Digital Library.
