= Opis (mythology) =

In Greek mythology, Opis (Ancient Greek: Ὦπις, romanized: Ôpis, lit. 'sighting') or Upis (Ancient Greek: Οὖπις, romanized: Oûpis) may refer to the following characters:

Feminine

- Opis or Ops, another name for Rhea.
- Opis, one of the 50 Nereides, marine-nymph daughters of the 'Old Man of the Sea' Nereus and the Oceanid Doris. She was one of the nymphs in the train of Cyrene.
- Opis, Oupis or Upis, a Hyperborean maiden, daughter of the North Wind Boreas. Together with Arge, she carried an offering which had been vowed for the birth of Apollo and Artemis, to Eileithyia, at Delos.
- Upis, the name of a mythical being said to have reared Artemis. She may be the same as in above nymph.
- Opis or Ops, mother by Evaemon of Eurypylus, one of the Achaean Leaders.

Masculine

- Upis or Upisis, father of the "third" Artemis by Glauce.

Surname

- Oupis or Upis, a surname of Artemis, as the goddess assisting women in childbirth.
- Upis, a surname of Nemesis at Rhamnous, in the remote northernmost deme of Attica.
