= Palaephatus of Abydus =

Ancient Greek historiographer

Palaephatus of Abydus (Ancient Greek: Παλαίφατος ὁ Ἀβυδηνός) was a historiographer from the 4th century BC, hailing from Abydos in Hellespont. In his youth, he was a lover of Aristotle.

The Suda mentions the titles of some of his works (Cypriaca, Deliaca, Attica, Arabica), all of which have been completely lost.

== Bibliography ==
- Smith, William (1870). "Palaephatus of Abydus". A Dictionary of Greek and Roman Biography and Mythology.
- "Palaiphatos". The Suda. "in Athens, epic poet; son of Aktaios and Boio, but other sources say, of Iokles and Metaneira; according to others [he was son] of Hermes. He lived after Phemonoe according to some, but according to others even before her. He wrote a Generation of the Universe in 5000 verses, Births of Apollo and Artemis in 3000 verses, Speeches and words of Aphrodite and Eros in 5000 verses, Contest of Athena and Poseidon in 1000 verses, [and] Leto's lock."
