= Sosipolis (god) =

Ancient Greek god

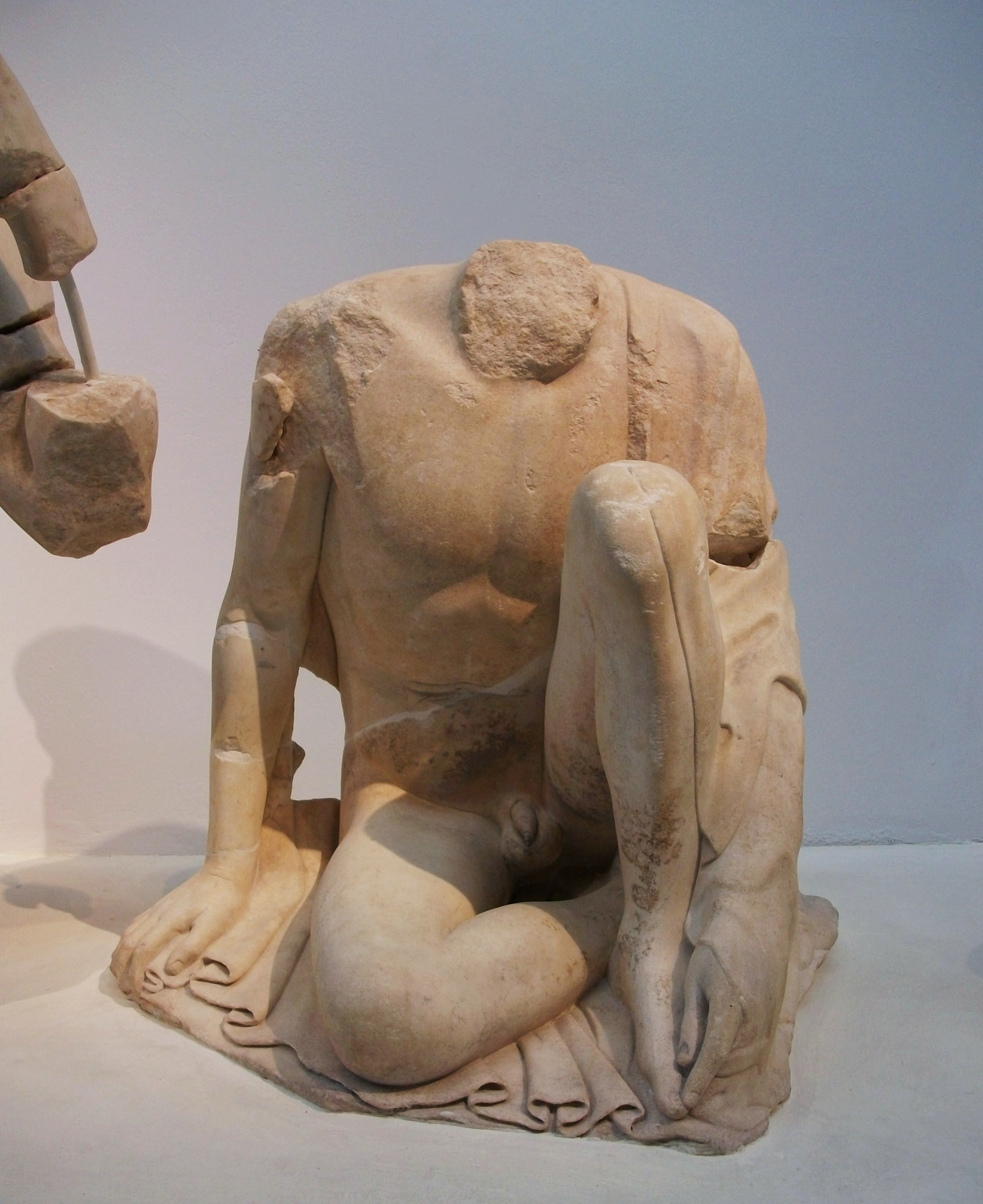
A kneeling boy, identified as Sosipolis by some, on the eastern pediment of temple of Zeus from Olympia, 5th-century BC.

In ancient Greek religion and mythology, Sosipolis (Ancient Greek: Σωσίπολις, romanized: Sōsípolis, lit. 'saviour of the city') was a native god at Elis. His mother was the childbirth-goddess Eileithyia, daughter of Zeus and Hera. There was a sanctuary of him inside the sanctuary of Eileithyia at Olympia, Greece. There was also a shrine dedicated to him on the left of the sanctuary of Tyche in Elis.

== Mythology ==
According to the legend described by Pausanias, the Arcadians had invaded Elis and the Eleans were ready to fight them. Then among the Eleans appeared a woman with a boy at her breast. She said that when she had given birth to the child, she had a vision in a dream to offer the child as a champion to the Eleans. The commanders of the Eleans believed her and placed the child naked before their ranks. When the Arcadians began the attack, the child turned into a serpent. The Arcadians fled in dismay and the Eleans pursued them and were victorious.

The Eleans then called the boy Sosipolis, meaning savior of the city. On the spot where he had transformed into a snake, they built a sanctuary to him. Worship of the goddess Eileithyia also took place there since she was his mother. The tomb of the Arcadians who were killed in the battle was on the hill across the Cladeus.

== Cult ==
The sanctuary of Sosipolis was inside the temple of Eileithyia at Olympia. The building had two parts. The front part was public and was dedicated to the Eileithyia, but in the inner part Sosipolis was worshipped, and only the priestess who was responsible for the god could enter. Eleans chose an old priestess for the goddess every year. The priestess was also responsible for Sosipolis. She lived in chastity, brought water for the god's bath, and set before him barley cakes kneaded with honey. When she entered the inner part of the Sosipolis, she had to wrap her head and face in a white veil. Maidens and matrons wait in the sanctuary of Eileithyia chanting a hymn; they burned all manner of incense to the god, but it was not the custom to pour libations of wine. Oaths in which he was called upon were very important.

There was also a shrine dedicated to Sosipolis on the left of the sanctuary of Tyche in Elis. The god was painted as a boy wrapped in a star-spangled robe and in one hand holding the horn of Amaltheia, according to his appearance in a dream.

== Genealogy ==
Sosipolis's family tree

Uranus
Cronus
Zeus
Hebe	Ares

Gaia
Rhea
Hera
a
b
Eileithyia	Hephaestus
SOSIPOLIS

== Bibliography ==
- Schefold, Karl (1986). "Chrysippos I". Lexicon Iconographicum Mythologiae Classicae (LIMC). Vol. III.1: Atherion – Eros. Zürich and Munich: Artemis Verlag. Internet Archive.
