= Amnisos =

Archaeological site in Crete, Greece

Coordinates: 35.331295°N 25.207035°E

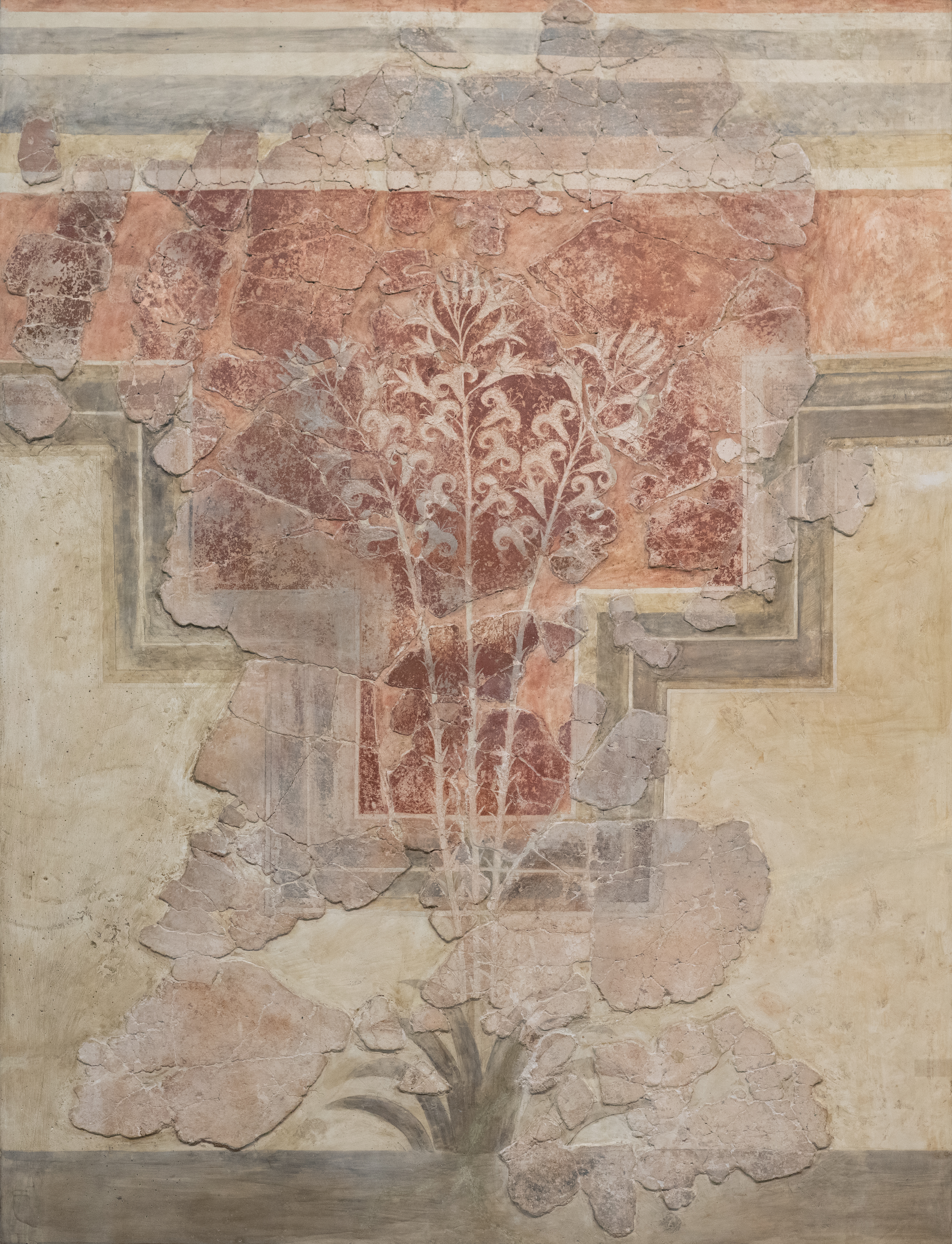
Wall-painting from the villa, on display at the Archaeological Museum of Heraklion

Amnisos, also Amnissos and Amnisus (Greek: Ἀμνισός or Ἀμνισσός; Linear B: 𐀀𐀖𐀛𐀰 A-mi-ni-so), is the current but unattested name given to a Bronze Age settlement on the north shore of Crete that was used as a port to the palace city of Knossos. It appears in Greek literature and mythology from the earliest times, but its origin is far earlier, in prehistory.

The historic settlement belonged to a civilization now called Minoan. Excavations at Amnissos in 1932 uncovered a villa that included the "House of the Lilies", which was named for the lily theme that was depicted in a wall fresco.

== Geography ==
Amnisos is 7 km east of Heraklion (Iraklio) on a beach used for recreation by the citizens of the modern city. The current sea level is three meters higher than the Bronze Age sea level. The walls of submerged houses are visible from the shore.

The ancient settlement bears the same name as the river exiting there. Currently called the Karteros, from the iron-aged name of Caeratus, the river was the Amnisos during the Bronze Age. Across from its mouth is a very small island called Amnisos. The river begins on Mount Ida in central Crete and runs through Karteros Ravine. During the drier season, the river is reduced to a stream. In his hymn to Artemis, the ancient poet Callimachus names the nymphs of the river the Amnisiades, and makes them part of the retinue of the goddess. The Byzantine grammarian Stephanus of Byzantium mentions the existence of the river in his Ethnica and gives both Amnisiades and Amnisides as the names of the river's nymphs.

There was no navigable stream to Knossos, today part of the port city. The road was lined with very ancient cult sites. One site is the cave of the goddess Eileithyia. It contained objects dating as far back as the Neolithic period. Such a cave is mentioned by Odysseus in the Odyssey, and the ancient Greek geographer Strabo also refers to there being a temple to Eileithyia there.

== Archaeology ==
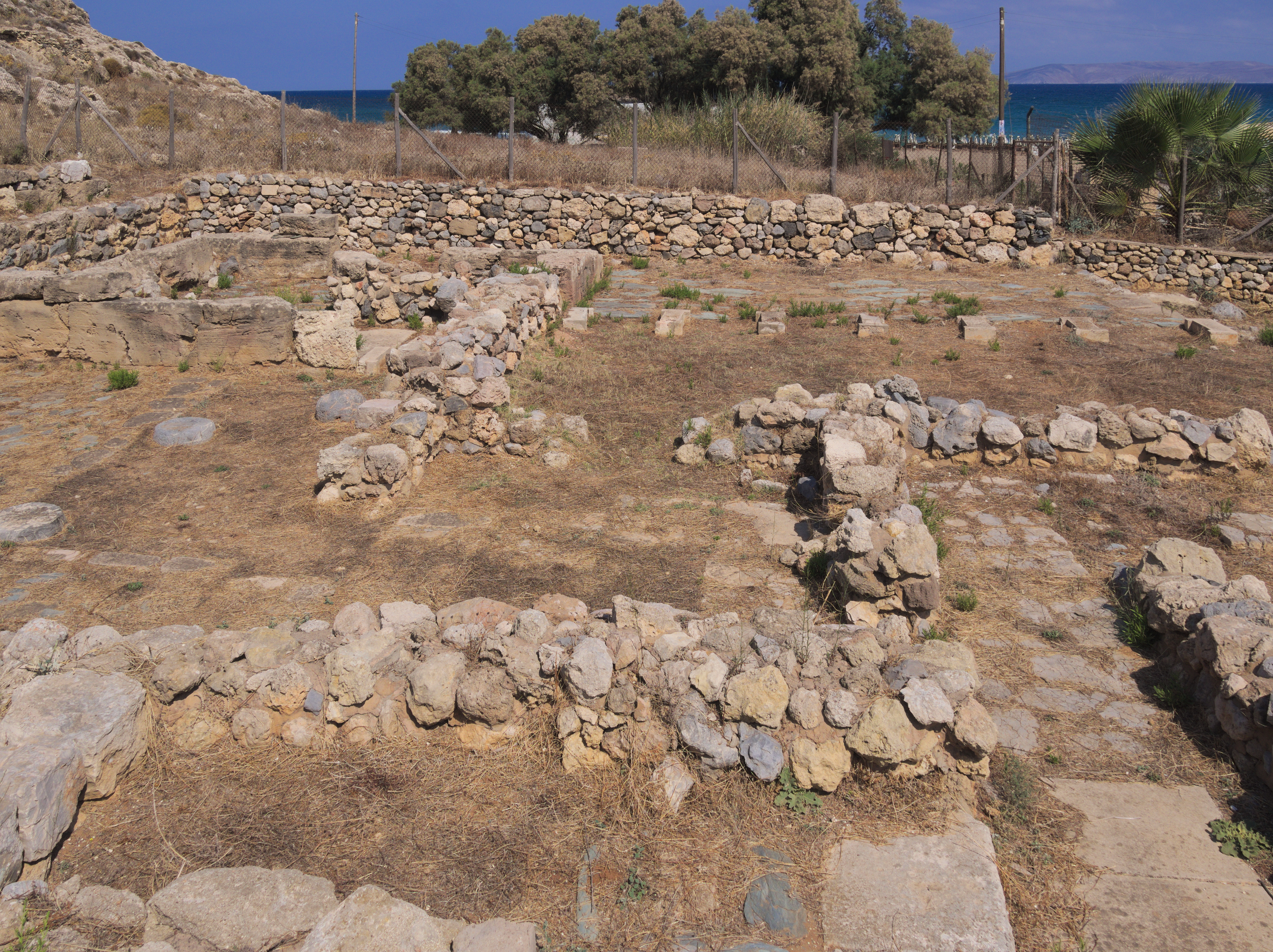
The "House of the Lilies".

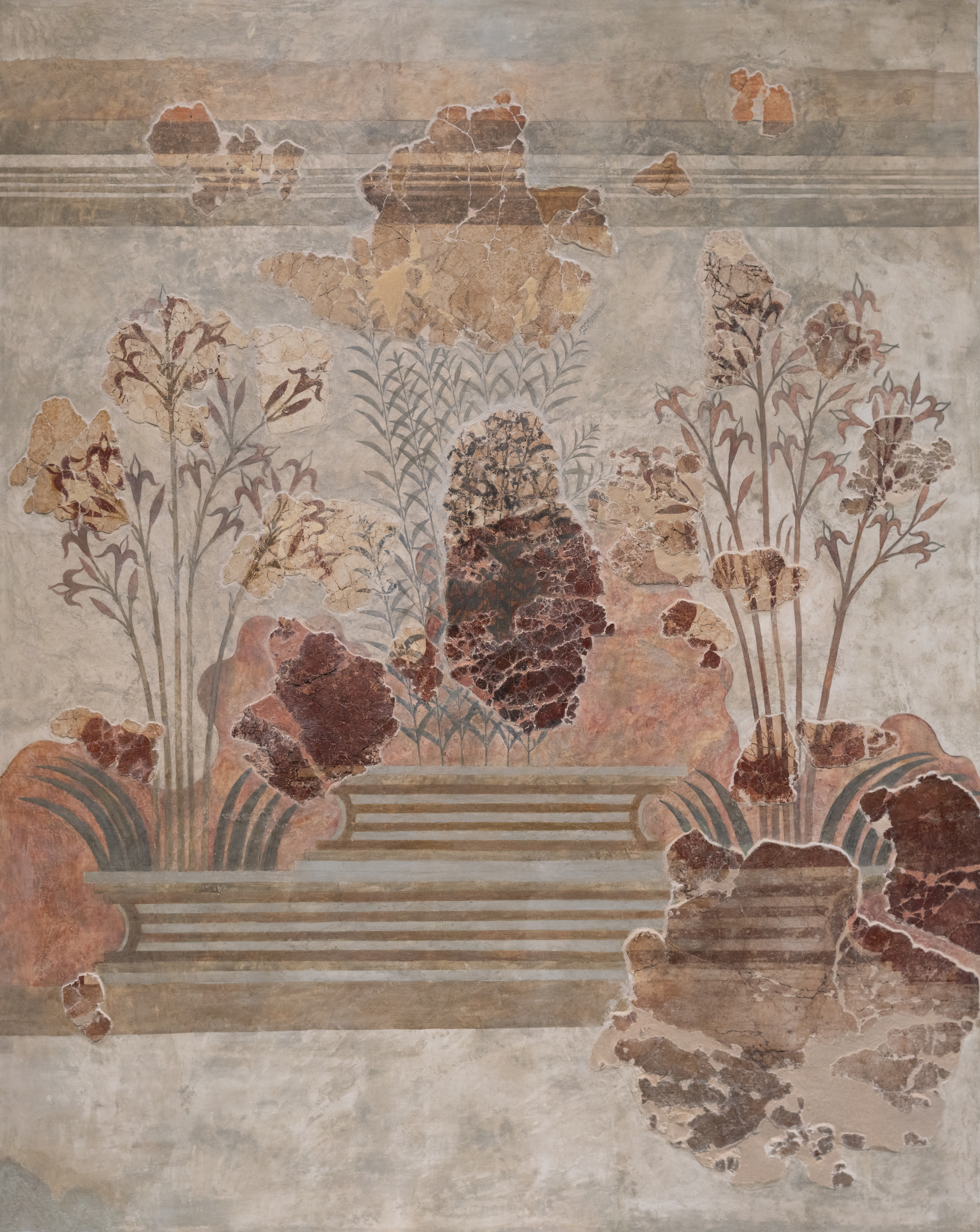
Another wall-painting from the villa

Amnisos was first excavated in 1932 by Spyridon Marinatos, who discovered the villa and "The House of Lilies", which was named for the only restorable fresco. The two-storeyed villa had ten rooms and included a paved court, a hall with a polythyra, a kitchen area, a shrine, and a bathroom.

The restored 1.8-meter-high lily fresco on the second storey depicts red and white lilies, mint, iris, and papyrus growing in pots. Concerning the date, Matz has this to say:

"The blossoms ... are inlaid with coloured paste on a ruby ground, by a method similar to that used for inlaying intarsia. This is a rare technical process. Dating is made possible by concurrence with vases originating from a Late MM IIIa level."

If it is on the border between the middle Bronze Age (Middle Minoan) and the late Bronze Age (Late Minoan), then the fresco is an early instance of a typical style in the early period of the late Bronze Age, or "Palace Period". Often termed the "naturalistic style", it flourished ca. 1570-1470 BCE. In it are stylized motifs from nature, especially floral, and courtly scenes. The original colors of red, blue, yellow, and black were bright.

The house was destroyed by fire during the Late Minoan IA period.

== Bronze-Age history ==
Amnisos is mentioned in a few Linear B tablets, mainly from Knossos, as 𐀀𐀖𐀛𐀰, a-mi-ni-so, reconstructed to *Amnisos. An example is tablet KN Gg 705 quoted by Ventris and Chadwick:

Amnisos: One jar of honey to Eleuthia,

One jar of honey to all [of] the gods. . . .

The tablet records a votive offering from or at Amnisos to the goddess of childbirth, probably the one worshipped at the cave mentioned above. The word "a-mi-ni-so" was pivotal in Michael Ventris' deciphering of Linear B. Ventris had constructed elaborate tables with possible phonemic values for the syllabary's symbols and had correctly identified key grammatical features such as declensional suffixes. He then made the crucial educated guess that a particular word referred to Amnisos, the port of Knossos. The guess proved an inspired one, as it was correct and let all the other pieces of the puzzle fall into place. The date of the Knossos tablets is still uncertain, but it is likely that they belong to the late Bronze Age. Amnisos is mentioned on the itinerary published on the statue base of Amenophis III at Kom el-Heitan, as an ambassadorial stop to Keftiu (Crete), dated ca. 1380 BCE.

By that date, the residents of Knossos and almost certainly of its port, Amnisos, were speaking Greek. In the thumbnail historical sketch given by John Chadwick in The Mycenaean World, Chapter 1, Chadwick writes:

Crete was occupied down to the fifteenth century by people who did not speak Greek...

Instead, they spoke the language that was written in the yet undeciphered script called Linear A. These people, called Minoans by Arthur Evans, were extremely influential at sea:

Around the sixteenth century the Minoan influence on the mainland becomes very marked.

During this floruit, the House of Lilies was occupied. Minoan civilization is not believed to have been warlike; there are few traces of arms and armor. They probably represented a mercantile hegemony, safe in their island home and protected by their fleet.

Around 1450 BCE, the villa was burned along with all of the other major sites in Crete except for Knossos. These events are generally interpreted as an interest in ruling the island by Mycenaean Greeks. As the name Amnisos evidences the pre-Greek -ssos suffix, they probably took the name as it was.

== See also ==
- Kommos
- List of ancient Greek cities
