= Eileithyia =

Ancient Greek goddess of childbirth

- Goddess of childbirth
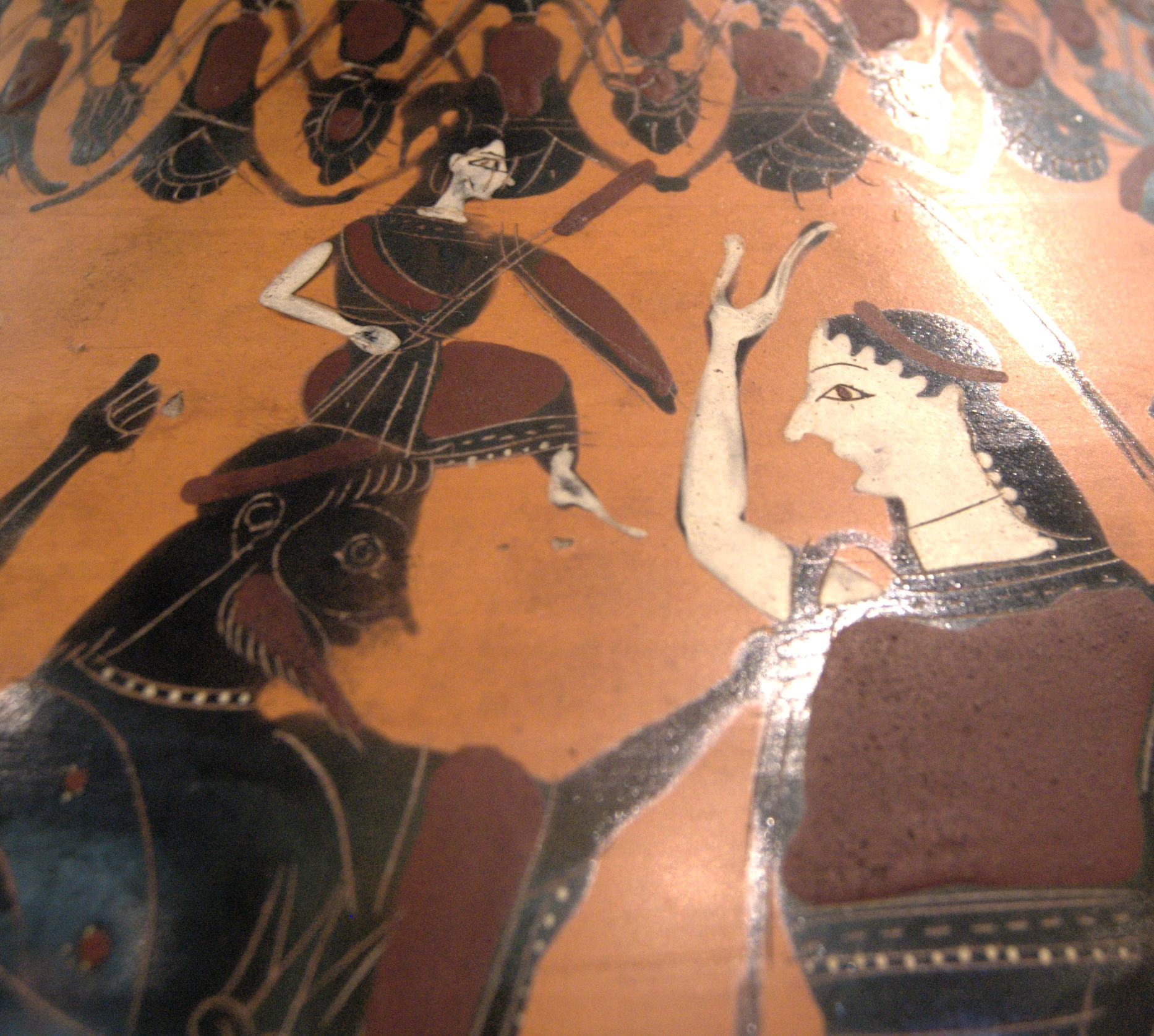
- The birth of Athena from the head of Zeus, with Eileithyia on the right
- Abode: Mount Olympus

Genealogy
- Parents: Zeus and Hera
- Siblings: Ares, Hebe, Hephaestus and several paternal half-siblings
- Children: Sosipolis

Eileithyia or Ilithyia (/ɪlɪˈθaɪ.ə/; Ancient Greek: Εἰλείθυια, Ancient Greek pronunciation: [eːlěː.t^{h}yi̯.a]; Ἐλεύθυια (Eleuthyia, [e.lěu̯.t^{h}yi̯.a]) in Crete, also Ἐλευθία (Eleuthia, [e.leu̯.t^{h}í.a]) or Ἐλυσία (Elysia, [e.ly.sí.a]) in Laconia and Messene, and Ἐλευθώ (Eleuthō, [e.leu̯.t^{h}ɔ̌ː]) in literature) was the Greek goddess of childbirth and midwifery, and the daughter of Zeus and Hera.

In the cave of Amnisos (Crete) she was related with the annual birth of the divine child, and her cult is connected with Enesidaon (the earth shaker), who was the chthonic aspect of the god Poseidon. It is possible that her cult is related with the cult of Eleusis. In his Seventh Nemean Ode, Pindar refers to her as the maid to or seated beside the Moirai (Fates) and responsible for the creation of offspring. Her son was Sosipolis, who was worshiped at Elis.

== Etymology ==
The earliest form of the name is the Mycenaean Greek 𐀁𐀩𐀄𐀴𐀊, e-re-u-ti-ja, written in the Linear B syllabic script. Ilithyia is the latinisation of Εἰλείθυια.

The etymology of the name is uncertain, and debated among scholars. R. S. P. Beekes suggests a non-Indo-European etymology, and Nilsson believed that the name is Pre-Greek. 19th-century scholars suggested that the name is Greek, derived from the verb eleutho (ἐλεύθω), "to bring", the goddess thus meaning The Bringer. Walter Burkert believed that Eileithyia is the Greek goddess of birth and that her name is pure Greek. However, the relation with the Greek prefix ἐλεύθ- is uncertain, because the prefix appears in some pre-Greek toponyms like Ἐλευθέρνα (Eleutherna); therefore it is possible that the name is pre-Greek. Her name Ἐλυσία (Elysia) in Laconia and Messene probably relates her with the month Eleusinios and Eleusis. Nilsson also believed that the name "Eleusis" is pre-Greek.

== Origins ==
According to F. Willets, the goddess shows a clear connection to a preexisting Minoan goddess, as well as an earlier Neolithic concept. Eileithyia's guidance in childbirth may give influence of the first midwife. To Homer, she is "the goddess of childbirth". The Iliad pictures Eileithyia alone, or sometimes multiplied, as the Eileithyiai:

And even as when the sharp dart striketh a woman in travail, [270] the piercing dart that the Eilithyiae, the goddesses of childbirth, send—even the daughters of Hera that have in their keeping bitter pangs;

— Iliad 11.269–272

Hesiod (c. 700 BC) described Eileithyia as a daughter of Hera by Zeus (Theogony 921)—and the Bibliotheca (Roman-era) and Diodorus Siculus (c. 90–27 BC) (5.72.5) agreed. Also, a poem at the Greek Anthology Book 6, mention Eileithyia as Hera's daughter. But Pausanias, writing in the 2nd century AD, reported another early source (now lost): "The Lycian Olen, an earlier poet, who composed for the Delians, among other hymns, one to Eileithyia, styles her as 'the clever spinner', clearly identifying her with the Fates, thus making her older than Cronus." Being the youngest born to Gaia, Cronus was a Titan of the first generation and he was identified as the father of Zeus. Likewise, the meticulously accurate mythographer Pindar (522–443 BC) also makes no mention of Zeus:

Eleithuia, seated beside the deep-thinking Fates, hear me, creator of offspring, child of Hera great in strength.

— Seventh Nemean Ode, Line 1, translated by Diane Arnson Svarlien, 1990

Later, for the Classical Greeks, "She is closely associated with Artemis and Hera," Burkert asserts, "but develops no character of her own". In the Orphic Hymn to Prothyraia, virginal Artemis is given an epithet relating to the goddess of childbirth, making the divine huntress also "she who comes to the aid of women in childbirth":

When racked with labour pangs, and sore distressed
the sex invoke thee, as the soul's sure rest;
for thou Eileithyia alone canst give relief to pain,
which art attempts to ease, but tries in vain.
Artemis Eileithyia, venerable power,
who bringest relief in labour's dreadful hour.

— Orphic Hymn 2, to Prothyraia, as translated by Thomas Taylor, 1792.

Eileithyia is commonly in classical Greek art most often depicted assisting childbirth. Vase-painters, when illustrating the birth of Athena from Zeus' head, may show two assisting Eileithyiai, with their hands raised in the epiphany gesture. The Beauty of Durrës, a large 4th-century BCE mosaic shows the head figure of a woman, probably portrays the goddess Eileithyia. A fragment by Callimachus has Eileithyia assist her full-sister Hebe in her labour, presumably when she gave birth to Alexiares and Anicetus, her sons by Heracles.

== Cult ==
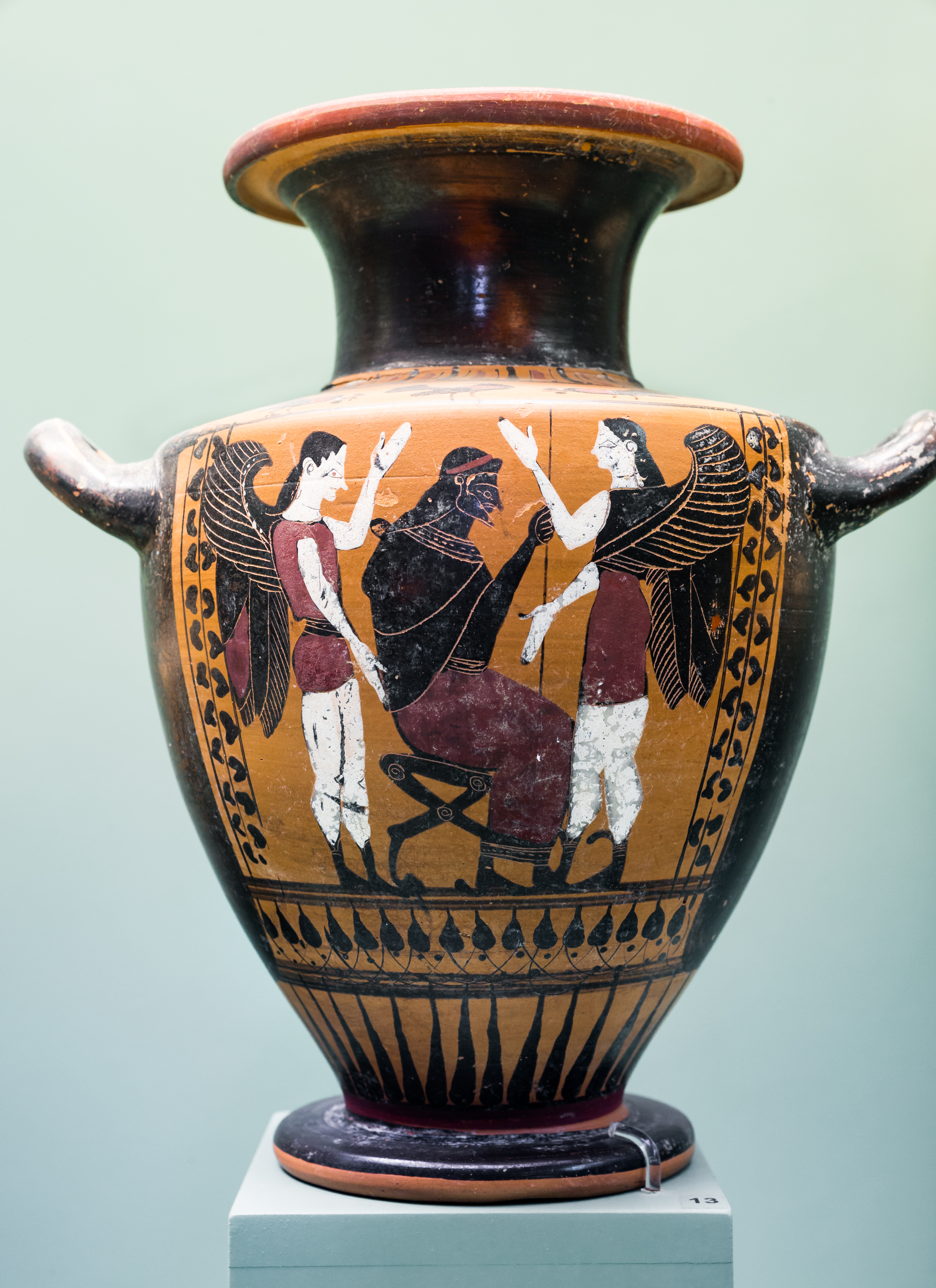
Zeus with two goddesses, perhaps two Eileithyiae, on a black-figure hydria from Rhodes, c. 530 BC

As the primary goddess of childbirth along with Artemis, Eileithyia had numerous shrines in many locations in Greece dating from Neolithic to Roman times, indicating that she was extremely important to pregnant women and their families. People would pray for and leave offerings for aid in fertility, safe childbirth, or give appreciation for a successful birth. Archaeological evidence of terracotta votive figurines depict children found at shrines, and holy sites dedicated to Eileithyia suggest that she was a kourotrophic divinity, whom parents would have prayed to for protection and care of their children. Midwives had an essential role in ancient Greek society, with women of all classes participating in the profession - many being slaves with only empirical training or some theoretical training in obstetrics and gynecology. More highly educated midwives, typically from higher classes, were referred to as iatrenes or doctors of women's diseases and would be respected as physicians.

She was invoked by women in labour, to ease the pain of labour, and to further the birth. Callimachus recorded the hymn:

Even so again, Eileithyia, come thou when Kykainis calls, to bless her pains with easy birth; so may thy fragrant shrine have, as now this offering for a girl, some other offering hereafter for a boy.

— Callimachus, Epigrams 54, translated by Mair

She was strongly connected with the goddesses Artemis and Hekate, sharing with the latter strong chthonic elements in her cult.

=== Achaea ===
Pausanias described a sanctuary to the goddess in the city of Aigion, and the cult associated with it: "At Aigion [in Akhaia] is an ancient sanctuary of Eileithyia, and her image is covered from head to foot with finely-woven drapery; it is of wood except the face, hands and feet, which are made of Pentelic marble. One hand is stretched out straight; the other holds up a torch. One might conjecture that torches are an attribute of Eileithyia because the pangs of women are just like fire. The torches might also be explained by the fact that it is Eileithyia who brings children to the light."

Aside from the sanctuary in the city of Aigion, Pausanias also noted that there were temples to the goddess in the towns of Boura and Pellene in Achaea.

=== Arcadia ===
Pausanias described two sanctuaries to the goddess in Arcadia, one in the town of Kleitor and the other one in Tegea. In Kleitor, she was worshipped as one of the most important deities, along with Demeter and Asklepios, and her sanctuary the most important one alongside the other two.

=== Argos ===
Offerings were often given to the goddess Eileithyia within the ten days following a child's birth Pausanias describes a sanctuary to her in the city of Argos, and the myth associated with it: "Near the Lords [sanctuary of the Dioskouroi at Argos] is a sanctuary of Eilethyia, dedicated by Helene when, Theseus having gone away with Peirithous to Thesprotia, Aphidna had been captured by the Dioskouroi and Helen was being brought to Lakedaimon. For it is said that she was with child, was delivered in Argos, and founded the sanctuary of Eilethyia, giving the daughter she bore to Klytaimnestra, who was already wedded to Agamemnon." Pausanias noted a shrine to her in Mycenae, and an important shrine in Mases in Argolis: "[At Mases, Argos] there is a sanctuary of Eileithyia within the wall. Every day, both with sacrifices and with incense, they magnificently propitiate the goddess, and, moreover, there is a vast number of votive gifts offered to Eileithyia. But the image no one may see, except, perhaps, the priestesses."

=== Athens ===
There were ancient icons of Eileithyia at Athens, one said to have been brought from Crete, according to Pausanias, who mentioned shrines to Eileithyia in Tegea and Argos, with an extremely important shrine in Aigion. Eileithyia, along with Artemis and Persephone, is often shown carrying torches to bring children out of darkness and into light: in Roman mythology her counterpart in easing labor is Lucina ("of the light").

Pausanias noted:

[Near the Prytaneion or Town Hall of Athens] is a temple of Eileithyia, who they say came from the Hyperboreans to Delos and helped Leto in her labour; and from Delos the name spread to other peoples. The Delians sacrifice to Eileithyia and sing a hymn of Olen. But the Kretans suppose that Eileithyia was born at Amnisos in the Knossian territory [in Krete], and that Hera was her mother. Only among the Athenians are the wooden figures of Eileithyia draped to the feet. The women told me that two are Kretan, being offerings of Phaidra [daughter of the mythical King Minos of Krete], and that the third, which is the oldest, Erysikhthon [an early king of Athens] brought from Delos.

=== Corinth ===
Pausanias noted a sanctuary in Corinth: "When you have turned from the Akrokorinthos [at Korinthos] into the mountain road you see the Teneatic gate and a sanctuary of Eileithyia."

=== Crete ===
The Cave of Eileithyia near Amnisos, the harbor of Knossos, mentioned in the Odyssey (xix.189) in connection with her cult, was accounted the birthplace of Eileithyia. In the river nearby also named Amnisos, lived nymphs that were sacred to Eileithyia named Amnisades and Amnisabes. The Cretan cave has stalactites suggestive of the goddess' double form (Kerenyi 1976 fig. 6), of bringing labor on and of delaying it, and votive offerings to her have been found establishing the continuity of her cult from Neolithic times, with a revival as late as the Roman period. Here she was probably being worshipped before Zeus arrived in the Aegean, but certainly in Minoan–Mycenaean times. The goddess is mentioned as Eleuthia in a Linear B fragment from Knossos, where it is stated that her temple is given an amphora of honey. In the cave of Amnisos (Crete) the god Enesidaon (the "earth shaker", who is the chthonic Poseidon) is related to the cult of Eileithyia. She was related with the annual birth of the divine child. The goddess of nature and her companion survived in the Eleusinian cult, where the following words were uttered: "Mighty Potnia bore a strong son."

In classical times, there were shrines to Eileithyia in the Cretan cities of Lato and Eleutherna and a sacred cave at Inatos. At a sanctuary in Tsoutsouros Inatos, two small terracotta figures, one breastfeeding and the other pregnant, have been dated to the 7th century.

=== Delos ===
According to the Homeric Hymn III to Delian Apollo, Hera detained Eileithyia, who was coming from the Hyperboreans in the far north, to prevent Leto from going into labor with Artemis and Apollo, since the father was her husband Zeus. Hera was jealous of Zeus's affairs and tended to enact revenge upon the women. The other goddesses present at the birthing on Delos had sent Iris to bring Eileithyia forth. As she stepped upon the island, the birth began. This hymn is contradicted by Hesiod's Theogony, where Apollo and Artemis are born before Hera's marriage to Zeus, and therefore neither Hera or Eileithyia are mentioned interfering with the birth of the twins. On Delos, a shrine was dedicated to Eileithyia, and was worshipped in a mid-winter festival named Eileithyaea. It was said by Callimachus that the hymn sung during the festival was the same as that sung by nymphs at Apollo's birth. This cult likely goes back to the Archaic period, and the cult was associated with other local Delian childbirth deities associated with Artemis, Upis and Arge, two of the Hyperborean maidens. It is similarly believed that another pair of the Hyperborean maidens, Laodice and Hyperoche, were worshipped in connection with Eileithyia.

=== Eretria ===
Archaeologists uncovered a sanctuary dedicated to Eileithyia at Eretria. The sanctuary had been placed in the northwestern section of a gymnasium.

=== Messene ===
Pausanias noted that "The Messenians have a temple erected to Eileithyia [at Messene, Messenia] with a stone statue."

=== Olympia ===
On the Greek mainland, at Olympia, an archaic shrine with an inner cella sacred to the serpent-savior of the city (Sosipolis) and to Eileithyia was seen by the traveler Pausanias in the 2nd century AD (Description of Greece vi.20.1–3); in it, a virgin-priestess cared for a serpent that was fed on honeyed barley-cakes and water—an offering suited to Demeter. The shrine memorialized the appearance of a crone with a babe in arms, at a crucial moment when Elians were threatened by forces from Arcadia. The child, placed on the ground between the contending forces, changed into a serpent, driving the Arcadians away in flight, before it disappeared into the hill.

=== Paros ===
Eileithyia had a cult south of the Mount Kounados on the Cycladic Island of Paros, where a cave with a natural spring functioned as an informal sanctuary. Numerous artifacts have been found, such as pottery, bronze pieces, and marble plaques, which indicate use of the site from the Geometric period to the Roman period. It has been theorized that the site was used for prayers for both female and male fertility, based on the type of offerings that have been found.

=== Sparta ===
There was a sanctuary dedicated to Eileithyia near the Sanctuary of Artemis Orthia, which Pausanias noted: "Not far from Orthia [the temple of Artemis in Sparta, Lakedaimon] is a sanctuary of Eileithyia. They say that they built it, and came to worship Eileithyia as a goddess, because of an oracle from Delphoi."

=== Syria ===
Lucian, in On the Syrian Goddess said that there was a statue of Eilithyia in the temple of Hierapolis Bambyce, at Manbij, in Syria.

== Genealogy ==
Eileithyia's family tree

Uranus
Cronus
Zeus
Hebe | Ares

Gaia
Rhea
Hera
a
b
EILEITHYIA | Hephaestus
Sosipolis

== See also ==
- The Genetyllides
- Lucina (mythology)
- Rumina
- Kotharat
