= Laodice and Hyperoche =

In Greek mythology, Laodice (/leɪˈɒdəˌsi/, [la.odíkɛː]; Ancient Greek: Λαοδίκη, romanized: Laodíkē, lit. 'justice of the people') and Hyperoche (Ὑπερόχη) were two of the Hyperborean Maidens, sent along with five male escorts to deliver offerings to Delos. All of them died there, and the Delians honored them with special ceremonies. The five male escorts were called by the Delians as the Perpherees (Περφερέες). Because of this incident, the Hyperboreans chose never to send people again. Instead, they began passing the offerings from one neighboring region to another, until they eventually reached Delos. They were honoured significantly in Delos:

This I know that they do. The Delian girls and boys cut their hair in honour of these Hyperborean maidens, who died at Delos; the girls before their marriage cut off a tress and lay it on the tomb, wound about a spindle; this tomb is at the foot of an olive-tree, on the left hand of the entrance of the temple of Artemis; the Delian boys twine some of their hair round a green stalk, and they likewise lay it on the tomb.

— Herodotus, The Histories, Book 4, Chapter 34
