= Arge =

Greek mythological characters

In Greek mythology, the name Arge (Ancient Greek: Ἄργη, romanized: Árgē) may refer to:

- Arge, a huntress. When she was pursuing a stag, she boasted that she would catch up with the animal even if it ran as fast as Helios. The sun god, offended by her words, changed her into a doe. As a huntress, she might be identical with the one below.
- Arge, one of the Hyperborean maidens who came to Delos together with Upis (another of the Hyperborean Maidens), Apollo and Artemis and received honors from the Delians till the end of their lives.
- Arge, a nymph from Lyctus, Crete. She was abducted by Zeus and brought by him to Mount Argyllus in Egypt, where she gave birth to a son, Dionysus. This version of the story of Dionysus' birth is only found in Pseudo-Plutarch's On Rivers.
- Arge, a nymph and the daughter of Zeus and Hera.
