= Epithets of Artemis =

Greek Goddess of the Hunt

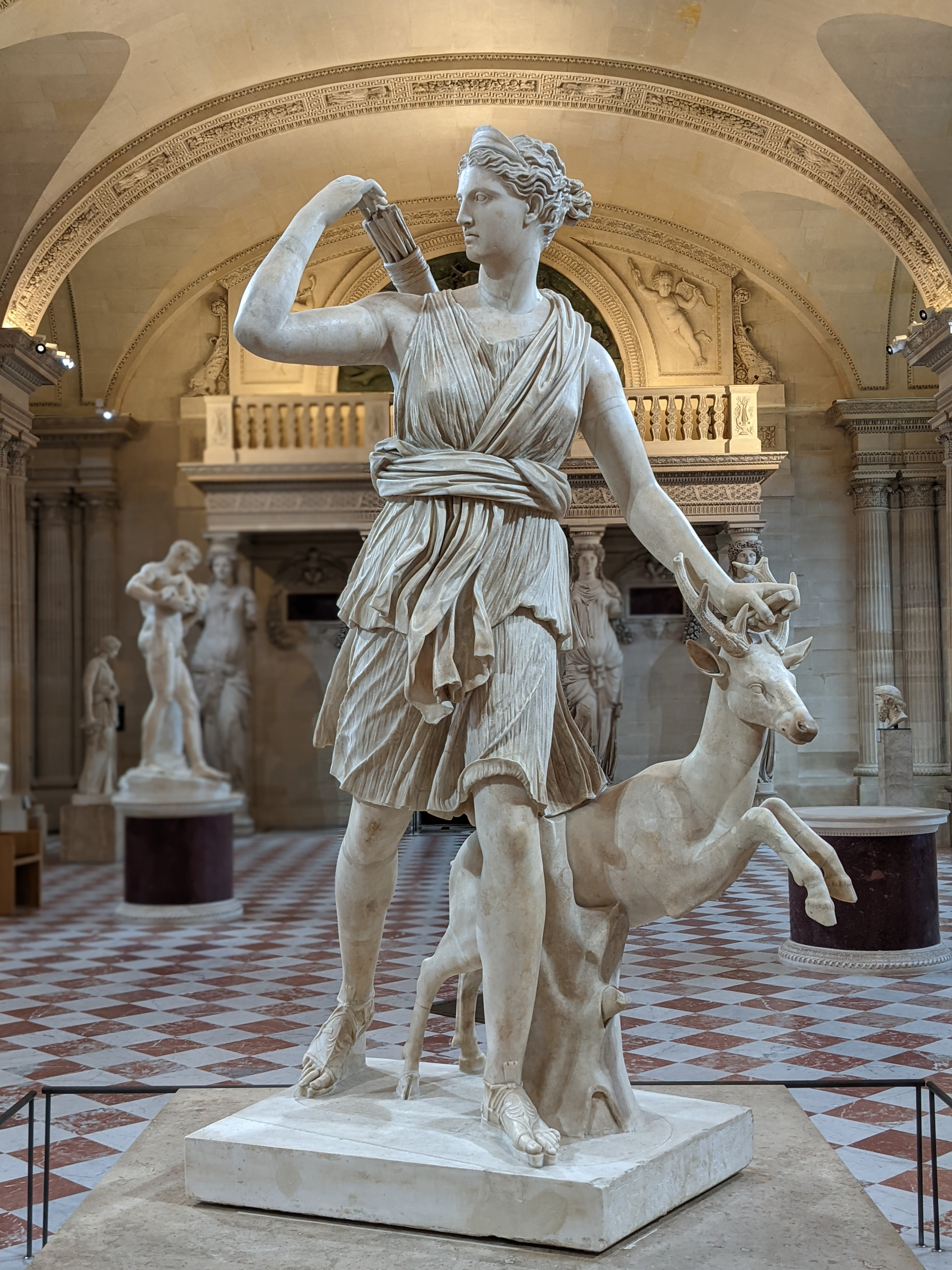
The Diana of Versailles, a Roman copy of a Greek sculpture by Leochares (Louvre Museum)

The numerous epithets of Artemis (titles which are applied to her name) indicate the diversity of the goddess's functions and roles. A number of these epithets, called epicleses, were used in cult, while others appear only in literature.

== A-B ==
Aeginaea, probably huntress of chamois or the wielder of the javelin, at Sparta However the word may mean "from the island Aegina", that relates Artemis with Aphaia (Britomartis).

Aetole, of Aetolia at Nafpaktos. A marble statue represented the goddess in the attitude of one hurling a javelin.

Agoraea, guardian of popular assemblies in Athens. She was considered to be the protector of the assemblies of the people in the agora. At Olympia the cult of "Artemis Agoraea" was related to the cult of Despoinai. (The double named goddesses Demeter and Persephone).

Agrotera, the huntress of wild wood, in the Iliad and many cults. It was believed that she first hunted at Agrae of Athens after her arrival from Delos. There was a custom of making a "slaughter sacrifice", to the goddess before a battle. The deer always accompanies the goddess of hunting. Her epithet Agraea is similar with Agrotera.

Alphaea, in the district of Elis. The goddess had an annual festival at Olympia and a temple at Letrinoi near the river Alpheus. At the festival of Letrinoi, the girls were dancing wearing masks. In the legend, Alphaea and her nymphs covered their faces with mud and the river god Alpheus, who was in love with her, could not distinguish her from the others. This explains, somehow, the clay masks at Sparta.

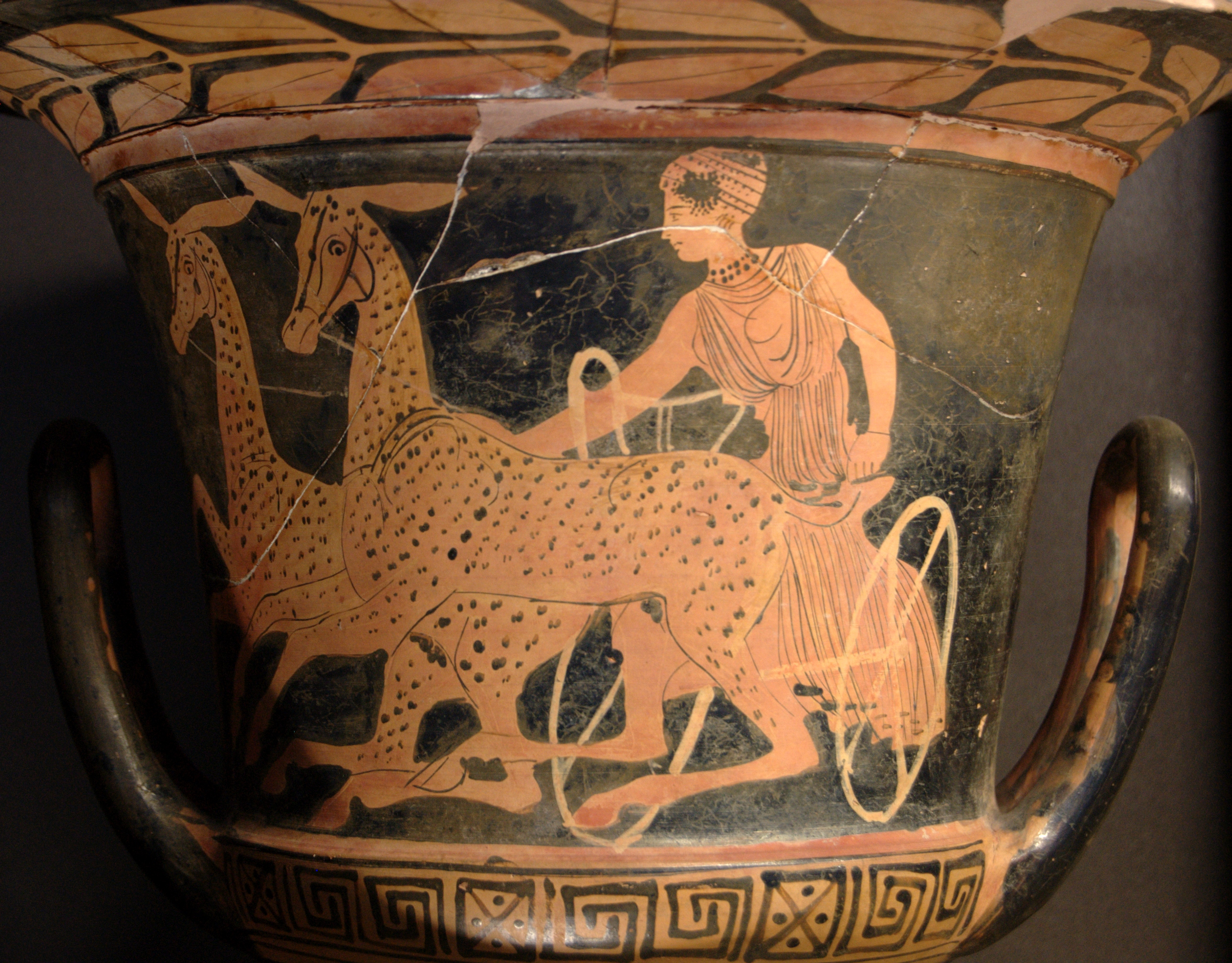
Artemis on her two hind-drawn chariot, Boeotian red-figure kylix, 450–425 BCE, by the Painter of Great Athens. Louvre, Paris.

Amarynthia, or Amarysia, with a famous temple at Amarynthus near Eretria. The goddess was related to the animals, however she was also a healer goddess of women. She is identified with Kolainis.

Amphipyros, with fire at each end, a rare epithet of Artemis as bearing a torch in either hand. Sophocles calls her, "Elaphebolos, (deer slayer) Amphipyros", reminding the annual fire of the festival Laphria The adjective refers also to the twin fires of the two peaks of the Mount Parnassus above Delphi (Phaedriades).

Anaitis, in Lydia. The fame of Tauria (the Tauric goddess) was very high, and the Lydians claimed that the image of the goddess was among them. It was considered that the image had divine powers. The Athenians believed that the image became booty to the Persians and was carried from Brauron to Susa.

Angelos, messenger, envoy, title of Artemis at Syracuse in Sicily.

Apanchomene, the strangled goddess, at Caphyae in Arcadia. She was a vegetation goddess related to the ecstatic tree cult. The Minoan tree goddesses Helene, Dentritis, and Ariadne were also hanged. This epithet is related to the old traditions where icons and puppets of a vegetation goddess would be hung on a tree. It was believed that the plane tree near the spring at Caphyae, was planted by Menelaus, the husband of Helen of Troy. The tree was called "Menelais". The previous name of the goddess was most likely Kondyleatis.

Aphaea, or Apha, unseen or disappeared, a goddess at Aegina and a rare epithet of Artemis. Aphaea is identified with Britomartis. In the legend Britomartis (the sweet young woman) escaped from Minos, who fell in love with her. She travelled to Aegina on a wooden boat and then she disappeared. The myth indicates an identity in nature with Diktynna.

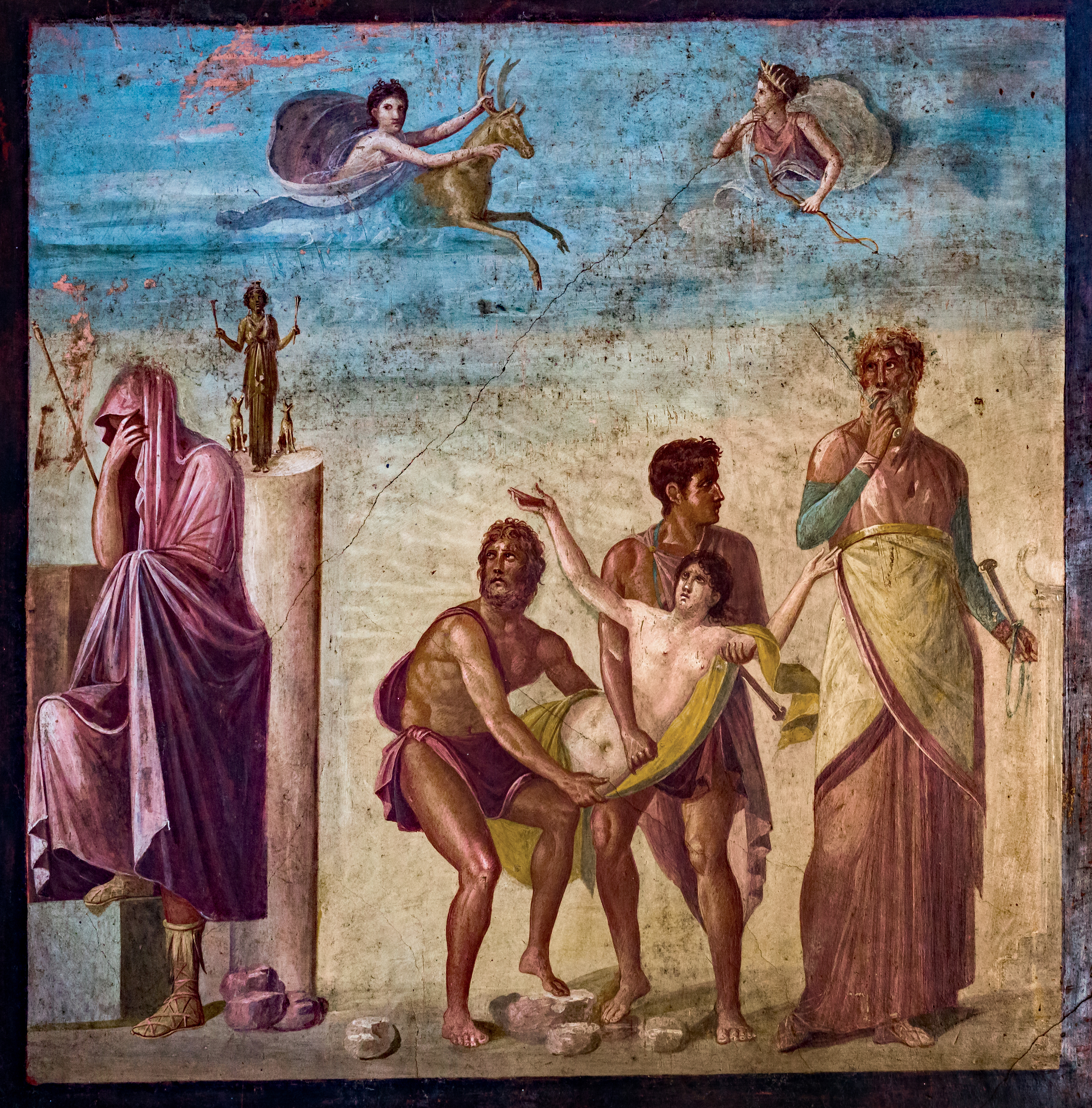
Sacrifice of Iphigenia. Antique fresco from Pompei, probably a copy of a painting by Timanthes. Agamemnon (right) and Clytemnestra crying (left). In the sky appears the fawn which will replace her. National Archaeological Museum, Naples.

Aricina, derived from the town Aricia in Latium, or from Aricia, the wife of the Roman forest god Virbius (Hippolytus). The goddess was related with Artemis Tauria (the Tauric Artemis). Her statue was considered the same with the statue that Orestes brought from Tauris. Near the sanctuary of the goddess there was a combat between slaves who had run away from their masters and the prize was the priesthood of Artemis.

Ariste, the best, a goddess of the women. Pausanias describes xoana of "Ariste" and "Kalliste" in the way to the academy of Athens and he believes that the names are surnames of the goddess Artemis, who is depicted carrying a torch. Kalliste is not related to Kalliste of Arcadia.

Aristobule, the best advisor, at Athens. The politician and general Themistocles built a temple of Artemis Aristobule near his house in the deme of Melite, in which he dedicated his own statue.

Astrateia, she that stops an invasion, at Pyrrichos in Laconia. A wooden image (xoanon), was dedicated to the goddess, because she stopped the invasion of the Amazons in this area. Another xoanon represented "Apollo Amazonios".

Basileie, at Thrace and Paeonia. The women offered wheat stalks to the goddess. In this cult, which reached Athens, Artemis is relative to the Thracian goddess Bendis.

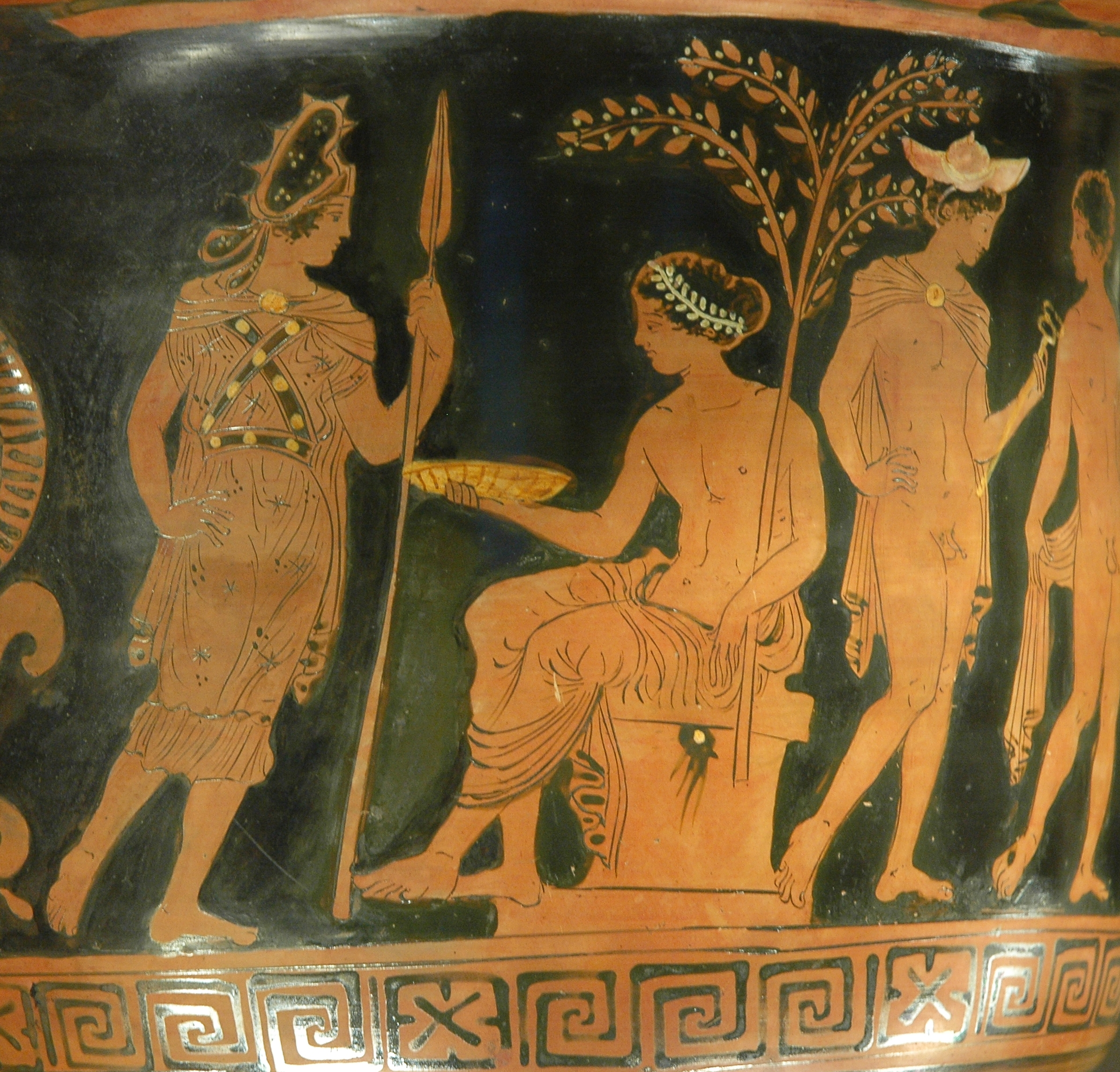
Artemis Bendis (with her Thracian cap), Apollo, Hermes and a young warrior. Apulian red-figure bell-shaped krater, c. 380–370 BCE by the Bendis Painter. Louvre, Paris.

Brauronia, worshipped at Brauron in Attica. Her cult is remarkable for the "arkteia", young girls who dressed with short saffron-yellow chitons and imitated bears (she-bears: arktoi). In the Acropolis of Athens, the Athenian girls before puberty should serve the goddess as "arktoi". Artemis was the goddess of marriage and childbirth. Genetyllis (Γενετυλλίς), was an epithet of her as a guardian of childbirth. The name of the small "bears" indicate the theriomorphic form of Artemis in an old pre-Greek cult. In the cult of Baubronia, the myth of the sacrifice of Iphigenia was represented in the ritual.

Bolosia and Mogostokos, of the birth pangs (bolae). Bolosia is mentioned in Procopius De Bellis. The other is a homeric epithet of Eileithyia, sometimes applied to Artemis.

Boulaia, of the council, in Athens.

Boulephoros, counselling, advising, at Miletus, probably a Greek form of the mother-goddess.

== C-D ==
Caryatis, the lady of the nut-tree, at Caryae on the borders between Laconia and Arcadia. Artemis was strongly related to the nymphs, and young girls were dancing the dance Caryatis. The dancers of Caryai were famous in antiquity. In a legend, Carya, the female lover of Dionysos was transformed into a nut tree and the dancers into nuts. The city is considered to be the place of the origin of the bucolic (pastoral) songs.

Cedreatis, near Orchomenus in Arcadia. A xoanon was mounted on the holy cedar (kedros).

Chesias, from the name of a river at Samos.

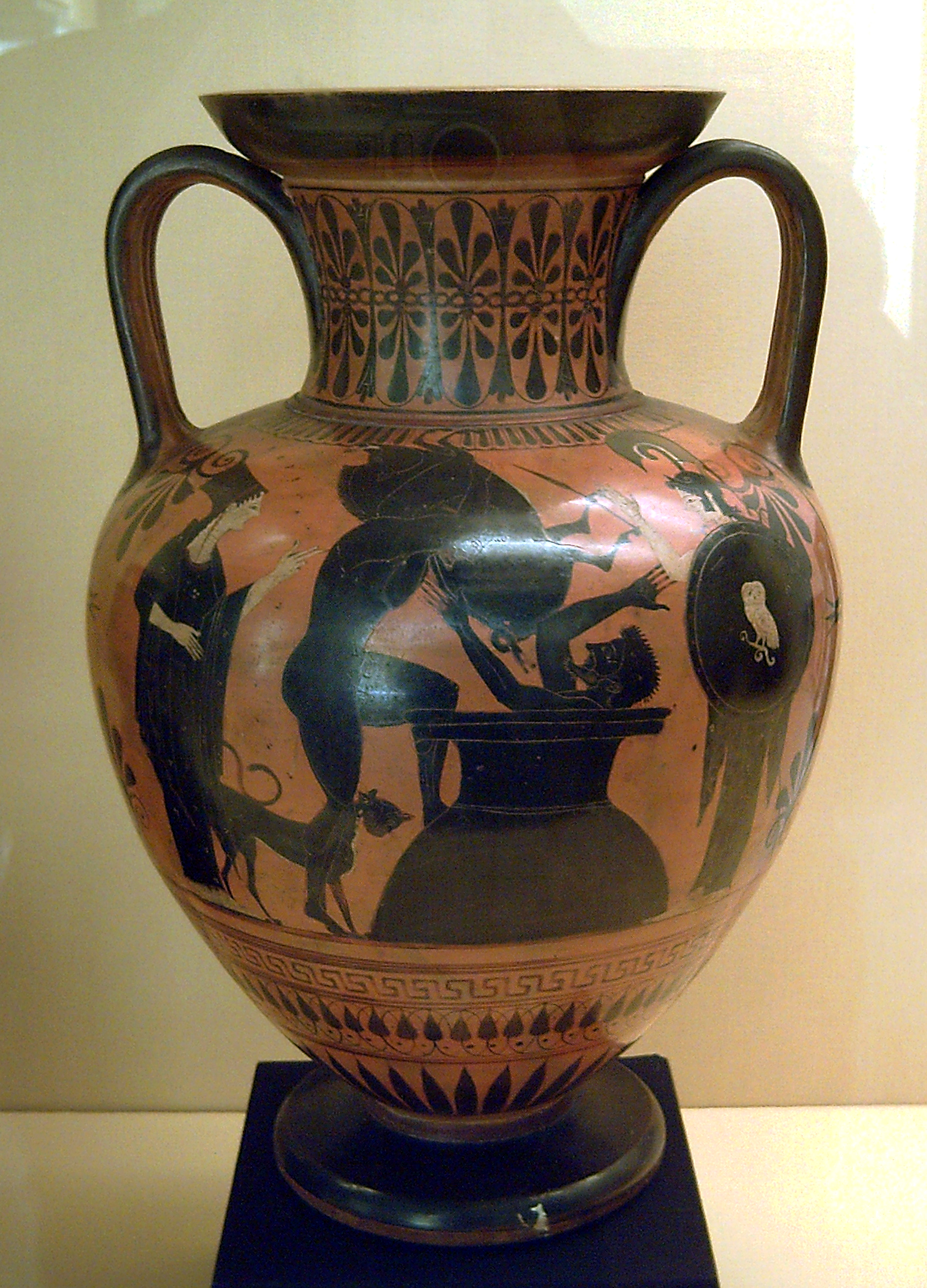
Heracles throwing the Erymanthian Boar on Eurystheus, who, frightened, hides in a jar. Goddesses Artemis (left) and Athena (right). Attic Amphora 500–515 BCE by Rycroft Painter. National Archaeological Museum (Madrid).

Chitonia, wearing a loose tunic of the huntress, she was honored in festivals bearing the same name (Chitonia, Χιτώνια). These celebrations took place both in Syracuse in Sicily and in the Attic village of Chitone. The festival in Syracuse was notable for its distinctive dance and the use of flute music.

Chrisilakatos, of the golden arrow, in Homer's Iliad as a powerful goddess of hunting. In the Odyssey, she descends from a peak and travels along the ridges of Mount Erymanthos, that was sacred to the "Mistress of the animals". In a legend, when the old goddess became wrathful, she would send the terrible Erymanthian boar to lay waste to fields. Artemis can bring an immediate death with her arrows. In the Iliad, Hera stresses the wild and darker side of her character and she accuses her of being "a lioness between women".

Chrisinios, of the golden reins, as a goddess of hunting in her chariot. In the Iliad, in her wrath, she kills the daughter of Bellerophon.

Coryphaea, of the peak, at Epidaurus in Argolis. On the top of the mountain Coryphum there was a sanctuary of the goddess. The famous lyric poet Telesilla mentions "Artemis Coryphaea" in an ode.

Cnagia, near Sparta in Laconia. In a legend the native Cnageus was sold as a slave in Crete. He escaped to his country taking with him the virgin priestess of the goddess Artemis. The priestess carried with her from Crete the statue of the goddess, who was named Cnagia.

Cynthia, as goddess of the moon, from her birthplace on Mount Cynthos at Delos. Selene, the Greek personification of the moon, and the Roman Diana were also sometimes called Cynthia.

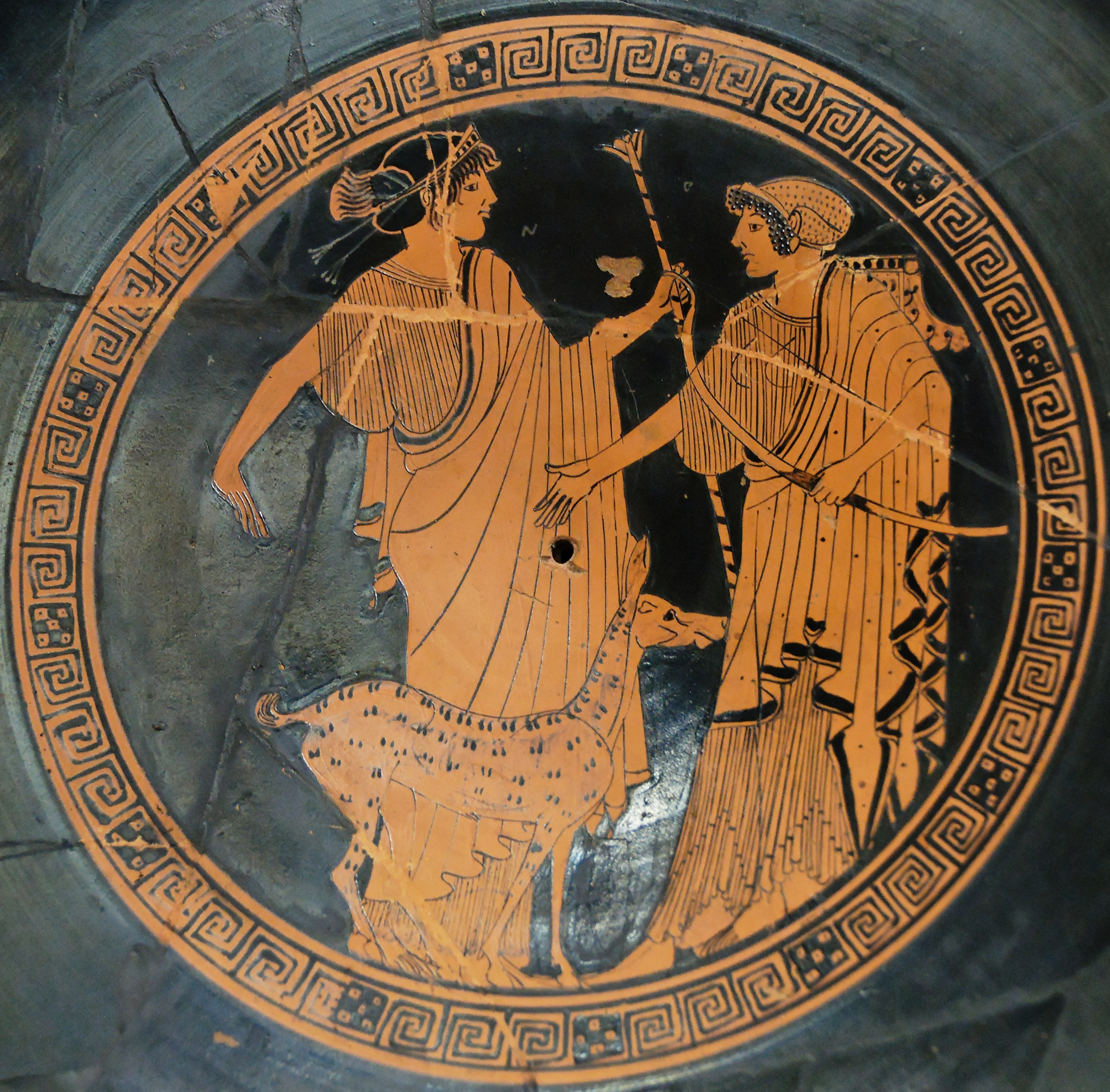
Apollo and Artemis. Tondo of an Attic red-figure cup, circa 470 BCE, by the Briseis Painter.Louvre, Paris

Daphnaea, as goddess of vegetation. Her name is most likely derived from the "laurel-branch" which was used as "May-branch", or an allusion to her statue being made of laurel-wood (daphne) Strabo refers to her annual festival at Olympia.

Delia, the feminine form of Apollo Delios

Delphinia, the feminine form of Apollo Delphinios (literally derived from Delphi).

Dereatis, at Sparta near Taygetos. Dancers were performing the obscene dance "kallabis".

Diktynna, from Mount Dikti, who is identified with the Minoan goddess Britomartis. Her name is derived from the mountain Dikti in Crete. A folk etymology derives her name from the word "diktyon" (net). In the legend Britomartis (the sweet young woman) was hunting together with Artemis who loved her desperately. She escaped from Minos, who fell in love with her, by jumping into the sea and falling into a net of fishes.

== E-H ==
Eileithyia, goddess of childbirth in Boeotia and other local cults especially in Crete and Laconia. During the Bronze Age, in the cave of Amnisos, she was related to the annual birth of the divine child. In the Minoan myth the child was abandoned by his mother and then he was nurtured by the powers of nature.

Elaphia, goddess of hunting (deer). Strabo refers to her annual festival at Olympia.

Elaphebolos, shooter of deer, with the festival "Elaphebolia" at Phocis and Athens, and the name of a month in several local cults. Sophocles calls Artemis "Elaphebolos, Amphipyros", carrying a torch in each hand. This was used during the annual fire of the festival of Laphria at Delphi.

Ephesia, at the city Ephesus of Minor Asia. The city was a great center of the cult of the goddess, with a magnificent temple, (Artemision). Ephesia belongs to the series of the Anatolian goddesses (Great mother, or mountain-mother). However she is not a mother-goddess, but the goddess of free nature. In the Homeric Ionic sphere she is the goddess of hunting.

Eucleia, as a goddess of marriage in Boeotia, Locris and other cities. Epheboi and girls who wanted to marry should make a preliminary sacrifice in honour of the goddess. "Eukleios" was the name of a month in several cities and "Eucleia" was the name of a festival at Delphi. In Athens Peitho, Harmonia and Eucleia can create a good marriage. The bride would sacrifice to the virgin goddess Artemis.

Eulochia see Lochia.

Eupraxis, fine acting. On a relief from Sicily the goddess is depicted holding a torch in one hand and an offering on the other. The torch was used for the ignition of the fire on the altar.

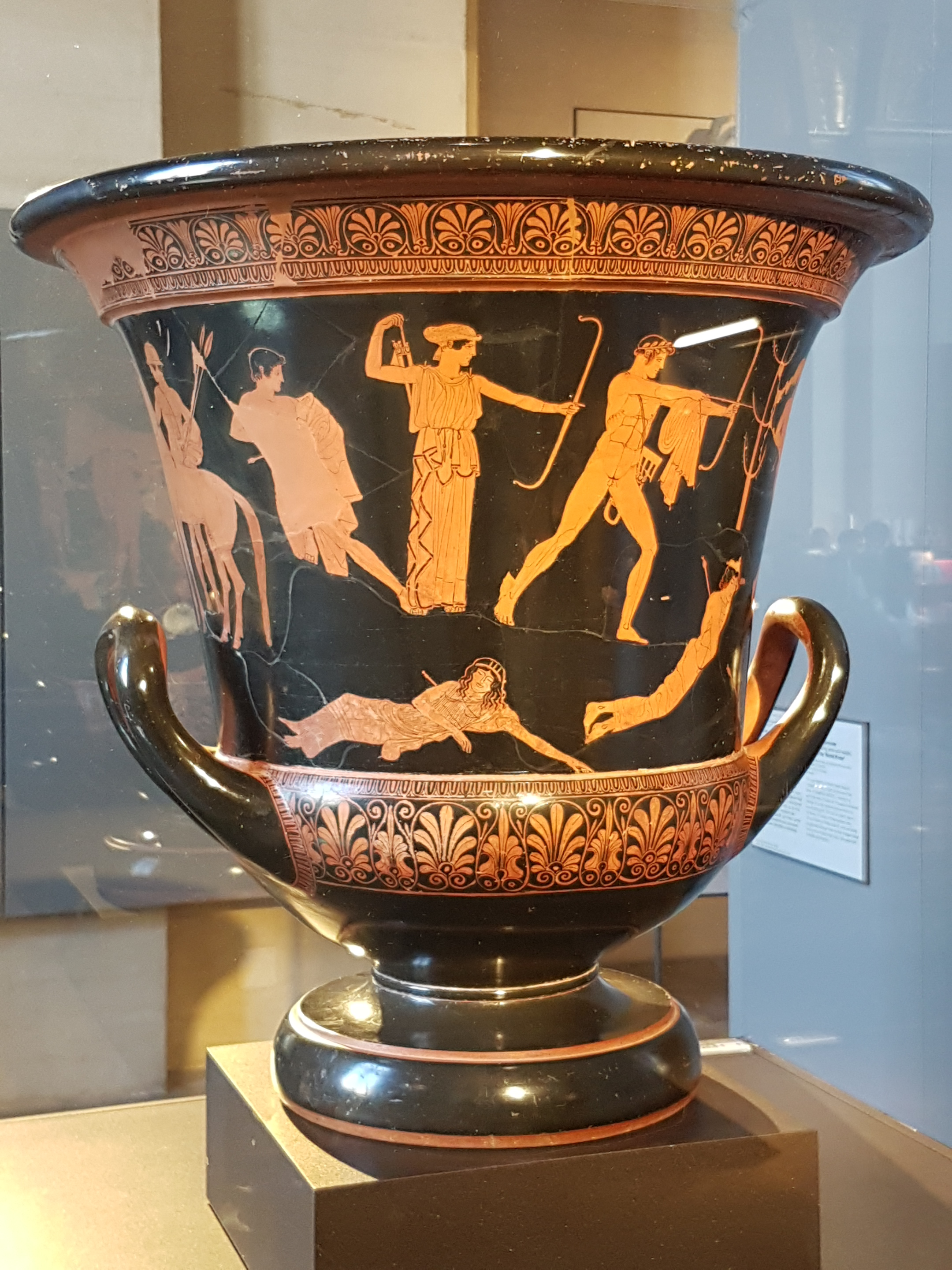
The Niobid Krater. Apollo and Artemis kill the children of Niobe, 460–450 BCE by the Niobid Painter. Louvre, Paris.

Eurynome, wide ruling, at Phigalia in Arcadia. Her wooden image (xoanon) was bound with a roller golden chain. The xoanon depicted a woman's upper body and the lower body of a fish. Pausanias identifies her as one of the Oceanids daughters of Oceanus and Tethys

Gaeeochus (Γαιήοχος) at Thebes, meaning "holder of the earth".

Geneteira see Lochia.

Hagemo, or Hegemone, leader, as the leader of the nymphs. Artemis was playing and dancing with the nymphs who lived near springs, waters and forests and she was hunting surrounded by them. The nymphs joined the festival of the marriage and then they returned to their original form. The pregnant women appealed to the nymphs for help. In Greek popular culture the commandress of the Neraiden (fairies) is called "Great lady", "Lady Kalo" or "Queen of the mountains".

Heleia, related to the marsh or meadow in Arcadia, Messenia and Kos.

Hemeresia, the soothing goddess worshipped at well Lusoi

Heurippa, horse finder, at Pheneus in Arcadia. Her sanctuary was near the bronze statue of Poseidon Hippios (horse). In a legend, Odysseus lost his mares and travelled throughout Greece to find them. He found his mares at Pheneus, where he founded the temple of "Artemis Heurippa".

Hymnia, at Orchomenos in Boeotia. She was a goddess of dance and songs, especially of female choruses. The priestesses of Artemis Hymnia could not have a normal life like the other women. They were at first virgins and were to remain celibate in the priesthood. They could not use the same baths and they were not allowed to enter the house of a private man.

== I-K ==
Iakinthotrophos, nurse of Hyacinthos at Knidos. Hyacinthos was a god of vegetation with Minoan origin. After his birth he was abandoned by his mother and then he was nurtured by Artemis who represents the first power of nature.

Imbrasia, from the name of a river at Samos.

Iocheaira, shooter of arrows by Homer (archer queen), as goddess of hunting. She has a wild character and Hera advises her to kill animals in the forest, instead of fighting with her superiors. Apollo and Artemis kill with their arrows the children of Niobe because she offended her mother Leto. In the European and Greek popular religion the arrow-shots from invisible beings can bring diseases and death.

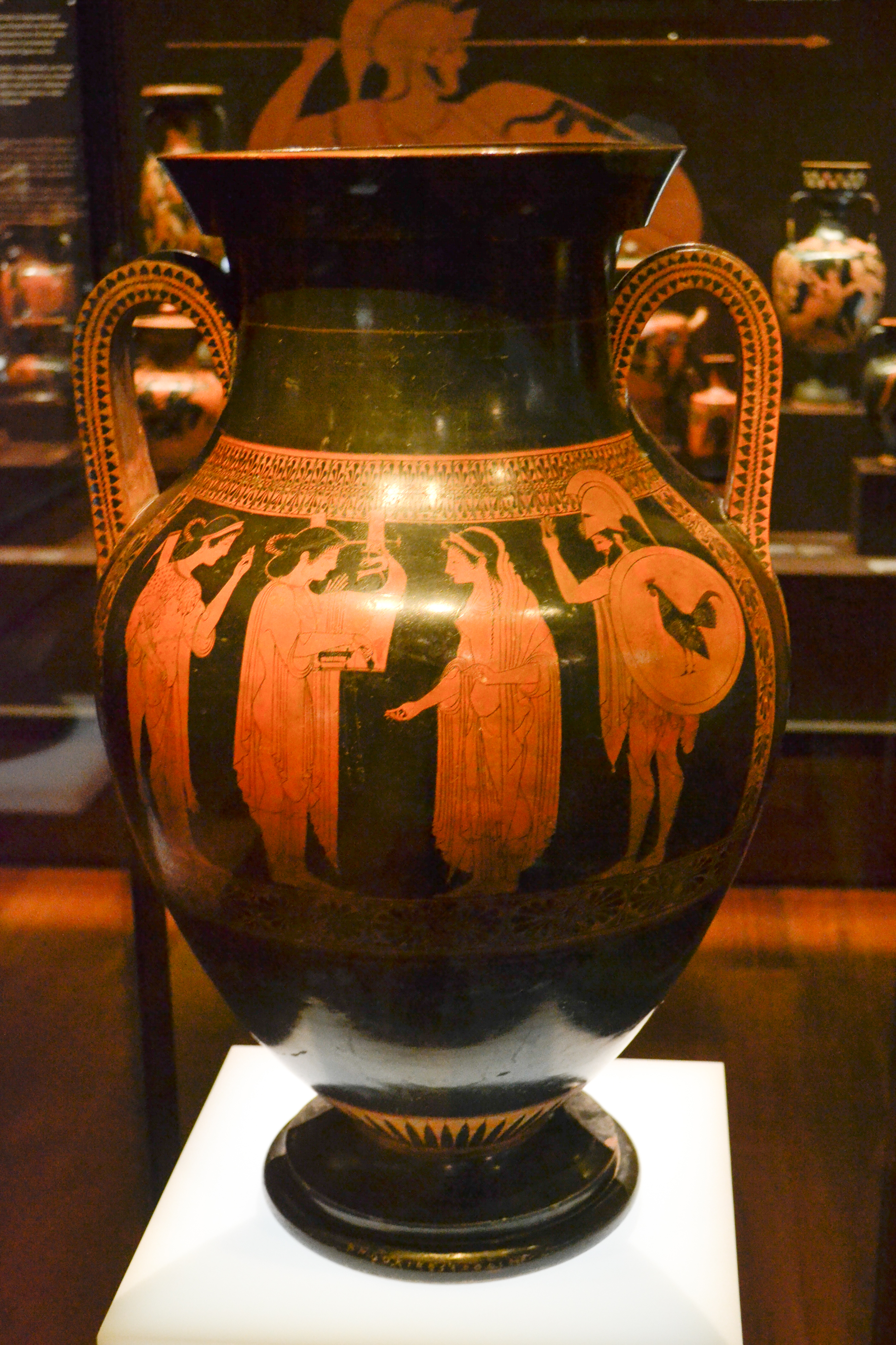
Left to right: Artemis, Apollo with his lyre, Leto and Ares. Attic amphora c. 510 BCE, by Psiax Painter. National Archaeological Museum (Madrid).

Issora, or Isora, at Sparta, with the surname Limnaia or Pitanitis. Issorium was a part of a great summit which advances into the level of Eurotas a Pausanias identifies her with the Minoan Britomartis.

Issoria (Ἰσσωρία), a name given to her from her shrine at Mount Issorion in Laconia.

Kalliste, the most beautiful, another form of Artemis with the shape of a bear at Tricoloni near Megalopolis a mountainous area full of wild beasts. Kallisto the attendant of Artemis, bore Arcas the patriarch of the Arcaden. In a legend Kallisto was transformed into a bear and in another myth Artemis shot her. Kallisto is a hypostasis of Artemis with a theriomorphic form from a pre-Greek cult.

'Keladeini, echoing chasing (noisy) in Homer's Iliad because she hunts wild boars and deer surrounded by her nymphs.

'Kithone, as a goddess of childbirth at Millet. Her name is probably derived from the custom of clothes consecration to the goddess, for a happy childbirth.

Kolainis, related with the animals at Euboea and Attica. At Eretria she had a major temple and she was called Amarysia. The goddess became a healer goddess of women.

Kolias, in a cult of women. Men were excluded because the fertility of the earth was related to motherhood. Aristophanes mentions Kolias and Genetyllis who are accused for lack of restraint. Their cult had a very emotional character.

Kondyleatis, named after the village Kondylea, where she had a grove and a temple. In a legend some boys tied a rope around the image of the goddess and said that Artemis was hanged. The boys were killed by the inhabitants and this caused a divine punishment. All the women brought dead children in the world, until the boys were honourably buried. An annual sacrifice was instituted to the divine spirits of the boys. Kondyleatis was most likely the original name of Artemis Apanchomeni.

Kordaka, in Elis. Τhe dancers performed the obscene dance kordaka, which is considered the origin of the dance of the old comedy. The dance is famous for its nudge and hilarity and gave the name to the goddess.

Korythalia, derived from Korythale, probably the "laurel May-branch", as a goddess of vegetation at Sparta. The epheboi and the girls who entered the marriage age placed the Korythale in front of the door of the house. In the cult the female dancers (famous in the antiquity) performed boisterous dances and were called Korythalistriai. In Italy, the male dancers wore wooden masks and they were called kyrritoi (pushing with the horns).

Kourotrophos, protector of children. During the Apaturia the front hair of young girls and young boys (koureion) were offered to the goddess.

Kynago Κυναγώ, the female form of Kynagidas (Κυναγίδας, an epithet shared with her half-brother, Heracles Kynagidas), meaning "I hunt with dogs" or "I lead the hunt" (Κυν (Kyn) refers to "dog" or "hound" and αγώ (agō) is a verb meaning "I lead" or "I conduct").

== L-M ==
Laphria, the mistress of the animals (Pre-Greek name) in many cults, especially in central Greece, Phocis and Patras. "Laphria" was the name of the festival. The characteristic rite was the annual fire and there was a custom to throw animals alive in the flames during the fest. The cult of "Laphria" at Patras was transferred from the city Calydon of Aetolia In a legend during the Calydonian boar hunt the fierce-huntress Atalanta was the first who wounded the boar. Atalanta was a Greek heroine, symbolizing the free nature and independence

Lecho, protector of a woman in childbed, or of one who has just given birth.

Leukophryene, derived from the city Leucophrys in Magnesia of Ionia. The original form of the cult of the goddess is unknown, however it seems that once the character of the goddess was similar with her character in Peloponnese.

Limnaia, of the marsh, at Sparta, with a swimming place Limnaion. (λίμνη: lake).

Limnatis, of the marsh and the lake, at Patras, Ancient Messene and many local cults. During the festival, the Messenian young ladies were violated. Cymbals have been found around the temple, indicating that the festival was celebrated with dances.

Lochia, as goddess of childbirth and midwifery. Women consecrated clothes to the goddess for a happy childbirth. Other less common epithets of Artemis as goddess of childbirth are Eulochia and Geneteira.

Lousia, bather or purifier, as a healer goddess at Lusoi in Arcadia, where Melampus healed the Proitiden.

Lyaia, at Syracuse in Sicily. (Spartan colony). There is a clear influence from the cult of Artemis Caryatis in Laconia. The Sicilian songs were transformed songs from the Laconic bucolic (pastoral) songs at Caryai.

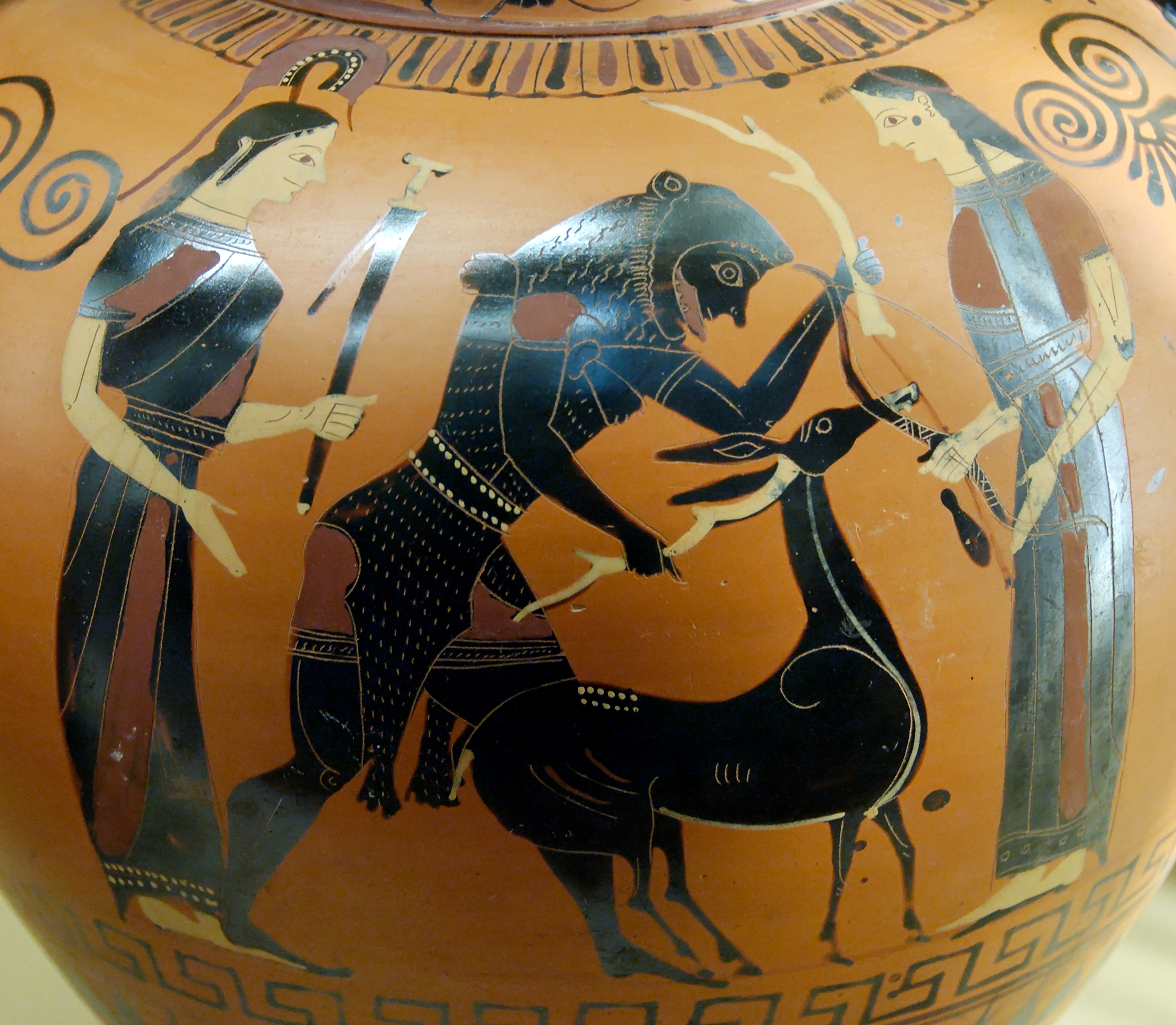
Heracles breaking off the golden antler of the Ceryneian Hind, while Athena (left) and Artemis (right) look on. Black-figure amphora, c. 540–530 BCE, from Vulci. British Museum, London.

Lyceia, of the wolf or with a helmet of a wolf skin, at Troezen in Argolis. It was believed that her temple was built by the hunter Hippolytus who abstained from sex and marriage. Lyceia was probably a surname of Artemis among the Amazons from whom Hippolytus descended from his mother. (Hippolyta).

Lycoatis, with a bronze statue at the city Lycoa in Arcadia. The city was near the foot of the mountain Mainalo, which was sacred to, Pan. On the south slope the Mantineians fetched the bones of Arcas, the son of Kallisto.(Kalliste).

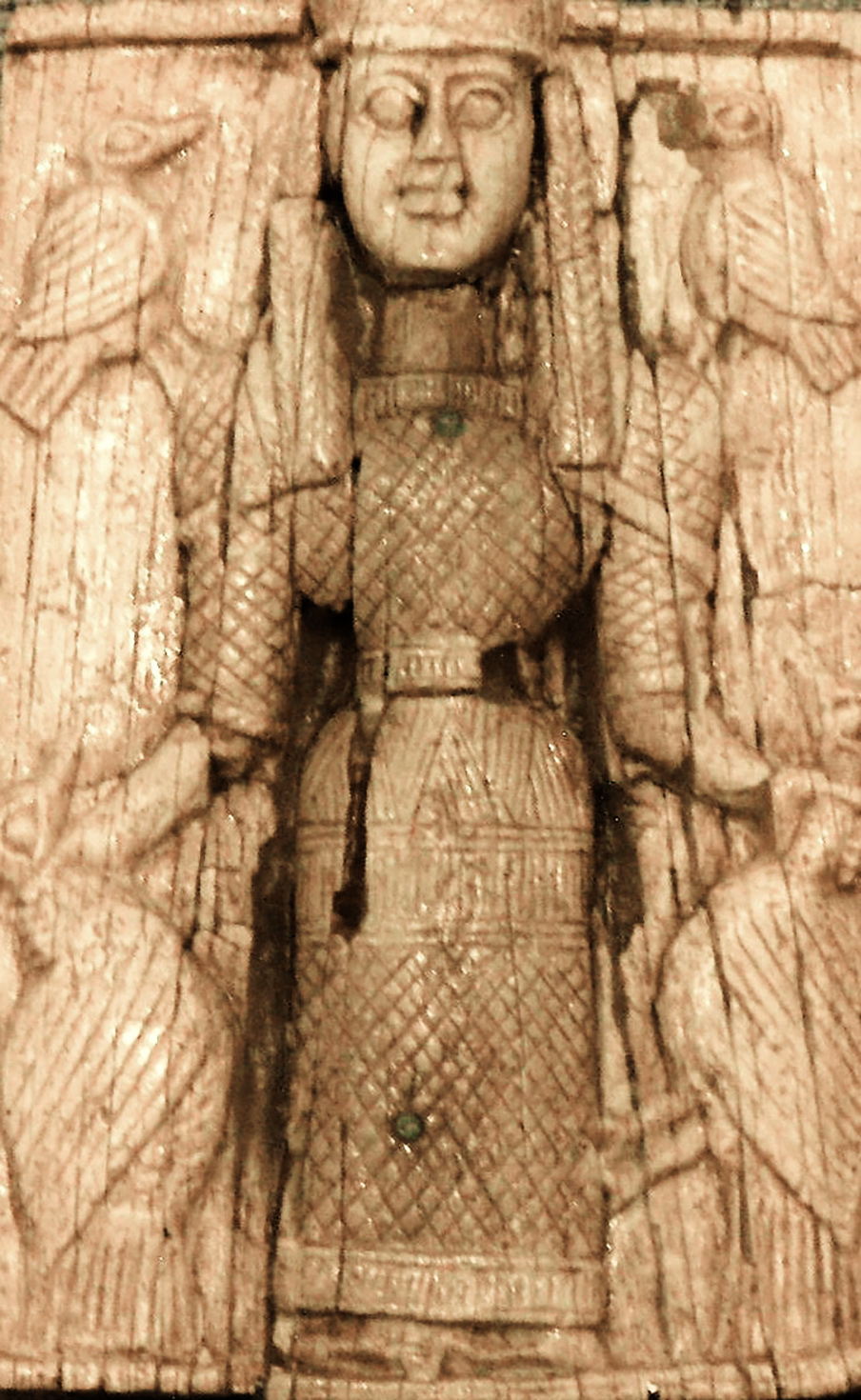
Archaic representation of the goddess Artemis Orthia. Ivory relief plate of a bronze fibula. The goddess holds waterbirds and wears a traditional hair style. From her sanctuary at Sparta, 660 BCE. National Archaeological Museum of Athens.

Lygodesma, willow bound, at Sparta (another name of Orthia). In a legend her image was discovered in a thicket of willows. standing upright (orthia).

Lysizonos, loosener of the girdle, and by extension the womb during intercourse or birth. Also given to Eileithyia.

Melissa, bee or beauty of nature, as a moon goddess. In Neoplatonic philosophy melissa is any pure being of souls coming to birth. The goddess took suffering away from mothers giving birth. It was Melissa who drew souls coming to birth.

Molpadia, singer of divine songs, a rare epithet of Artemis as a goddess of dances and songs and leader of the nymphs. In a legend Molpadia was an Amazon. During the Attic war she killed Antiope to save her by the Athenian king Theseus, but she was killed by Theseus.

Munichia, in a cult at Piraeus, related to the arkteia of Brauronian Artemis. According to legend, if someone killed a bear, he should be punished by sacrificing his daughter in the sanctuary. Embaros disguised his daughter by dressing her like a bear (arktos), and hid her in the adyton. He placed a goat on the altar and he sacrificed the goat instead of his daughter.

Mysia, with a temple on the road from Sparta to Arcadia near the "Tomb of the Horse".

== O-P ==
Oenoatis, derived from the city Oenoe in Argolis. Above the town there was the mountain Artemisium, with the temple of the goddess on the summit. In a Greek legend the mountain was the place where Heracles chased and captured the terrible Ceryneian Hind, an enormous female deer with golden antlers and hooves of bronze. The deer was sacred to Artemis.

Orthia, upright, with a famous festival at Sparta. Her cult was introduced by the Dorians. She was worshipped as a goddess of vegetation in an orgiastic cult with boisterous cyclic dances. Among the offerings, there were terracotta masks representing grotesque faces and it seems that animal-masks were also used. In literature there was a great fight for taking the pieces of cheese that were offered to the goddess. The whipping of the epheboi near the altar was a ritual of initiation, preparing them for their future life as soldiers. During this ritual the altar was full of blood.

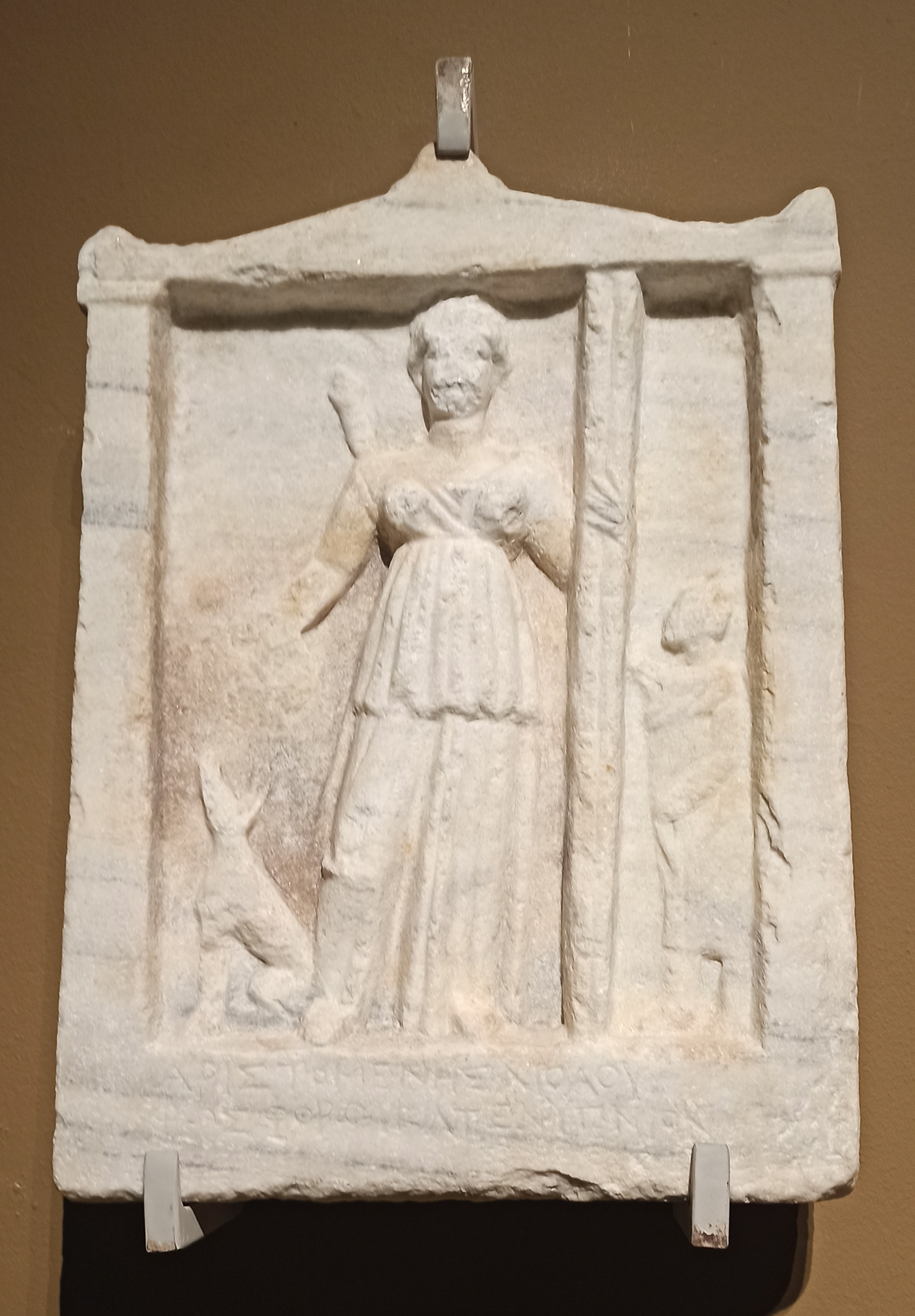
Votive relief with a dedication to Artemis Phosphorus. An exhibit of Varna Archaeological Museum.

Oupis, watcher, occasionally found in the Peloponnese and linked to Delos, explained as watcher over birth and upbringing of children in the Etymologicum Magnum.

Paidotrophos, protector of children at Corone in Messenia. During a festival of Korythalia the wet-nurses brought the infants in the sanctuary of the goddess, to get her protection.

Peitho, Persuasion, at the city Argos in Argolis. Her sanctuary was in the market place. In Pelopponnese Peitho is related to Artemis. In Athens Peitho is the consensual force in civilized society and emphasizes civic armony.

Pergaia, who was worshipped at Pamphylia of Ionia. A famous annual festival was celebrated in honor of Artemis in the city Perga. Filial cults existed in Pisidia, north of Pamphylia.

Pheraia, from the city Pherai, at Argos, Athens and Sicyon. It was believed that the image of the goddess was brought from the city Pherai of Thessaly. This conception relates Artemis with the distinctly Thessalian goddess Enodia. Enodia had similar functions with Hecate and she carried the common epithet "Pheraia".

Phakelitis, of the bundle, at Tyndaris in Sicily. In the local legend the image of the goddess was found in a bundle of dry sticks.

Phoebe, bright, as a moon goddess sister of Phoebus. The epithet Phoebe is also given to the moon goddess Selene.

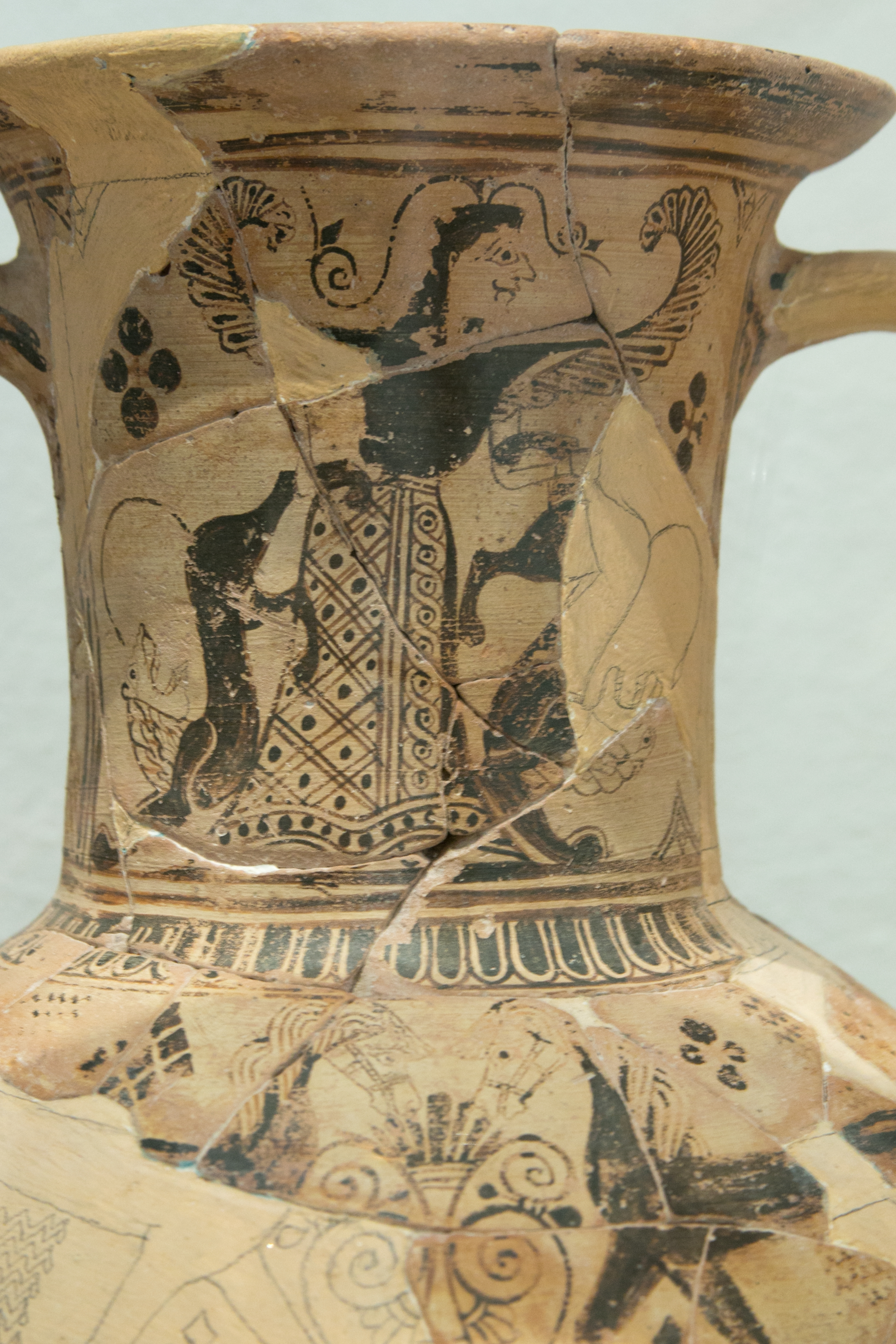
Artemis (potnia theron) on amphora of Naxos, Delos, 700–675 BCE, Archaeological Museum of Myconos

Phosphoros, carrier of light. In Ancient Messene she is carrying a torch as a moon-goddess and she is identified with Hecate.

Polo, in Thasos, with inscriptions and statues from the Hellenistic and Roman period. The name is probably related to "parthenos" (virgin).

Potamia, of the river, at Ortygia in Sicily. In a legend Arethusa, was a chaste nymph and tried to escape from the river god Alpheus who fell in love with her. She was transformed by Artemis into a stream, traversed underground and appeared at Ortygia, thus providing water for the city. Ovid calls Arethusa, "Alfeias" (Alfaea) (of the river god).

Potnia Theron, mistress of the animals. The origin of her cult is Pre-Greek and the term is used by Homer for the goddess of hunting. Potnia was the name of the Mycenean goddess of nature. In the earliest Minoan conceptions the "Master of the animals" is depicted between lions and daimons (Minoan Genius). Sometimes "potnia theron" is depicted with the head of a Gorgon, who is her distant ancestor. She is the only Greek goddess who stands close to the daimons and she has a wild side which differentiates her from other Greek gods. In the Greek legends when the goddess was offended she would send terrible animals like the Erymanthian boar and Calydonian boar to laid waste the farmer's land, or voracious birds like the Stymphalian birds to attack farms and humans. In Arcadia and during the festival of Laphria, there is evidence of barbaric animal sacrifices.

Praos, mild, gentle or tame, tied to appeasing her cruel or wild nature. Inscribed on a 3rd century BC couple's offering at Delphi.

Pythia, as a goddess worshipped at Delphi.

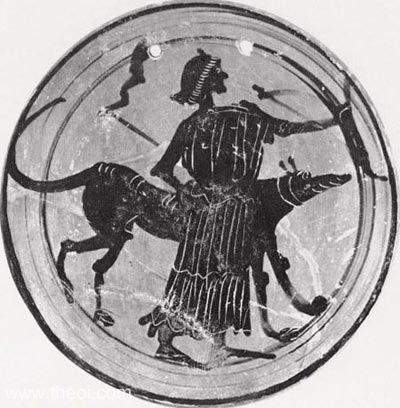
Hecate or Artemis is depicted with a bow, twin flaming torches and a large dog. Archaic Attic black figure kylix, attributed to Kleibolos Painter. Museum of the University of Tübingen, Baden.

== S-T ==
Saronia, of Saron, at Troezen across the Saronic gulf. In a legend the king Saron was chasing a doe that dashed into the sea. He followed the doe in the waters and he was drowned in the waves of the sea. He gave his name to the Saronic gulf.

Selasphoros, carrier of light, flame, as a moon-goddess identified with Hecate, in the cult of Munichia at Piraeus.

Soteira (Kore Soteira), Kore saviour, at Phigalia. In Arcadia the mistress of the animals is the first nymph closely related to the springs and the animals, in a surrounding of animal-headed daimons. At Lycosura Artemis is depicted holding a snake and a torch and dressed with a deer skin, besides Demeter and Persephone. It was said that she was not the daughter of Leto, but the daughter of Demeter.

Stymphalia, of Stymphalus, a city in Arcadia. In a legend the water of the river descended in a chasm which was clogged up and the water overflowed creating a big marsh on the plain. A hunter was chasing a deer and both fell into the mud at the bottom of the chasm. The next day the whole water of the marsh dried up and the land was cultivated. The monstrous man eating Stymphalian birds that were killed by Heracles were considered birds of Artemis.

Tauria, or Tauro (the Tauric goddess), from the Tauri or of the bull. Euripides mentions the image of "Artemis Tauria". It was believed that the image of the goddess had divine powers. Her image was considered to have been carried from Tauris by Orestes and Iphigenia and was brought to Brauron, Sparta or Aricia.

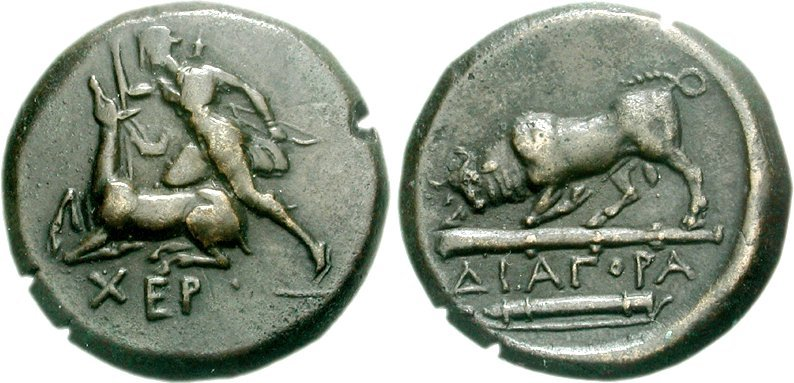
Coin from Tauric Chersonesus with Artemis, deer, bull, club and quiver. c. 320–290 BCE. Diagora-, magistrate. CHER, Artemis Parthenos left. DIAGORA, Bull butting right; Christopher Markom Collection

Tauropolos, usually interpreted as hunting bull goddess. Tauropolos was not original in Greece and she has similar functions with foreign goddesses, especially with the mythical bull-goddess. The cult can be identified at Halae Araphenides in Attica. At the end of the peculiar festival, a man was sacrificed. He was killed in the ritual with a sword cutting his throat. Strabo mentions that during the night-fest of Tauropolia a girl was raped.

Thermia, as a healer goddess at Lousoi in Arcadia, where Melampus healed the Proitiden.

Toxia, or Toxitis, bowstring in torsion, as goddess of hunting in the island of Kos and at Gortyn. She is the sister of "Apollo Toxias".

Triclaria, at Patras. Her cult was superimposed on the cult of Dionysos Aisemnetis. During the festival of the god the children were wearing garlands of corn-ears. In a ritual they laid them aside to the goddess Artemis. Triclaria was a priestess of Artemis who had sex with her lover in the sanctuary. They were punished to be sacrificed in the temple and each year the people should sacrifice a couple to the goddess. Europylus came carrying a chest with the image of Dionysos who put an end to the killings.

== See also ==
Category:Epithets of Artemis
