= List of hunting deities =

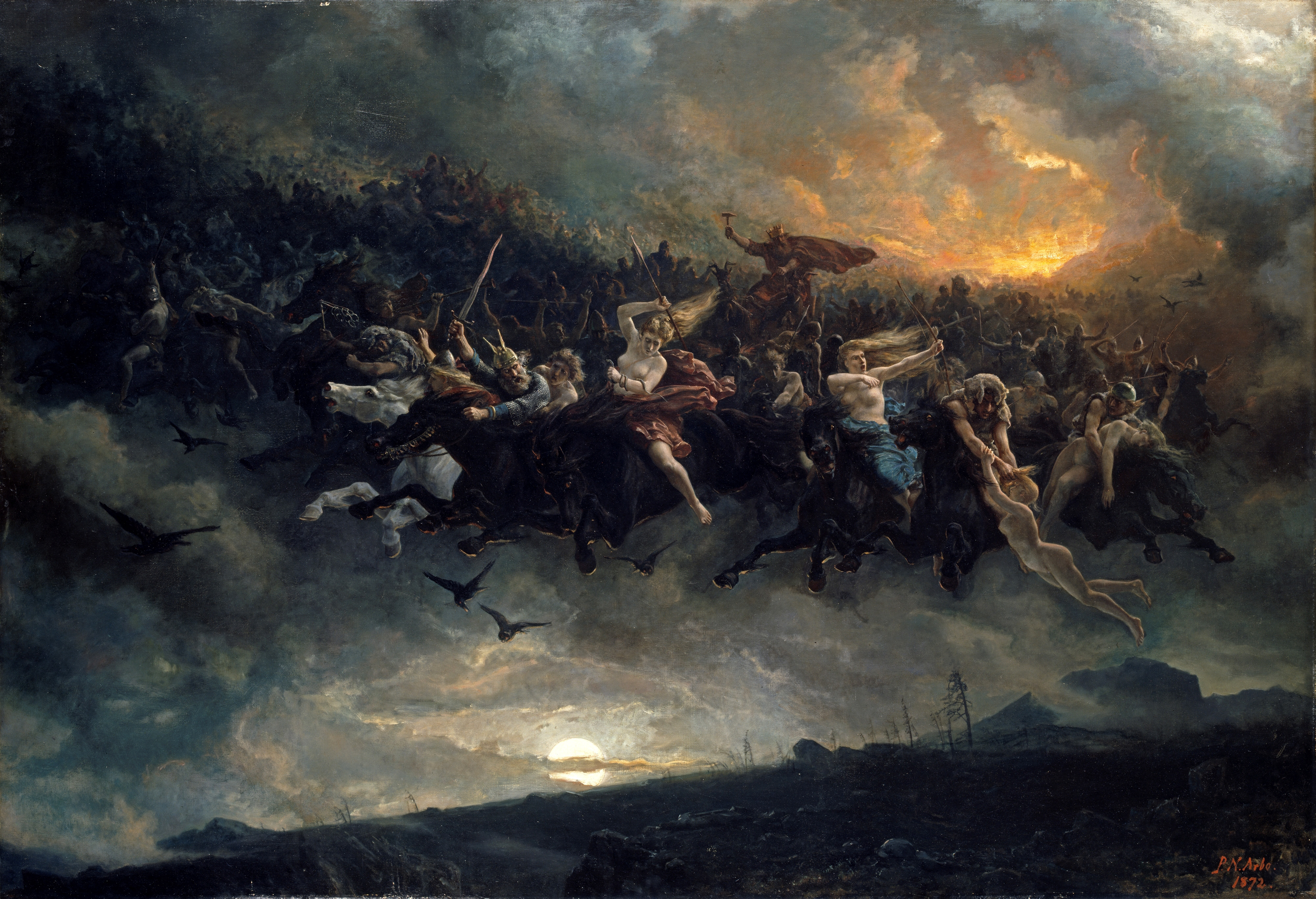
The Wild Hunt of Odin (1872) by Peter Nicolai Arbo, depicting the Wild Hunt of European folklore

A hunting deity is a deity in mythology associated with the hunting of animals and the skills and equipment involved. They are a common feature of polytheistic religions.

== Anglo-Saxon mythology ==
- Wōden, leader of the Wild Hunt

== Aztec mythology ==
- Mixcoatl, god of hunting.
- Opochtli, god of fishing.

== Akan mythology ==
- Ahosu, Goddess of hunting and the protector of wildlife, called upon for successful hunts. In myths, she killed people who overhunted or overharvested the forest’s resources.
- Bosomtwe, god of fishing and sailors.

== Celtic mythology ==
- Arawn, king of Annwn in some Welsh legends and associated with hunting, dogs and stags
- Cernunnos, a horned god associated with fertility and hunting
- Gwyn ap Nudd, another king of Annwn in Welsh Mythology, associated with the Wild Hunt
- Nodens, god associated with healing, the sea, hunting and dogs
- Vosagus, Gaulish god of hunting and forests; gives his name to the Vosges region

== Chinese mythology ==
- Fu Xi, the creator of fishery
- Jiang Ziya, a god of fishery
- Erlang Shen, god of hunting and protector of hunters

== Egyptian mythology ==
- Neith, goddess of war and the hunt
- Pakhet, a lioness huntress deity, whom the Greeks associated with Artemis
- Wepwawet, god of hunting and war, along with funerary practices
- Bastet, a cat goddess and natural hunter of reptiles and rodents. Greeks often associated her with Artemis, giving her the name Ailuros.

== Filipino mythology ==
- Abog: the Bagobo god of hunters
- Alagaka: the Tagalog protector of hunters
- Anlabban: the Isnag deity who looks after the general welfare of the people; special protector of hunters
- Amanikable: the Tagalog god of the sea who was spurned by the first mortal woman; also a god of hunters
- Bakero & Tawo-nga-talonon: Ati spirits of the forest; the first-fruits sacrifices of the hunt are offered to them through bits of meat, which would bring good luck to the people
- Cain: the Bugkalot headhunter creator of mankind; gave customs to the people; lived together with Abel in the sky but separated due to a quarrel
- Esa’: a Batak ancestor whose movements created the landscapes, which he named during a hunting journey with his dogs, who were after wild pigs
- Ga’ek Spirits: Bugkalot spirits in the Ga’ek magic plant used in relation to hunting and fishing; the naw-naw prayer is given to them
- Kabigat: the Bontok goddess of the moon who cut off the head of Chal-chal's son; her action is the origin of headhunting
- Kalao: Bugkalot spirit birds; depicted as red hornbills who guide and protect hunters and their soul
- Kedes: the Aeta god of the hunt
- Okot: the Bicolano forest god whose whistle would lead hunters to their prey
- Paglingniyalan: the Tagalog god of hunters
- Sugudun: also called Sugujun; the Manobo god of hunters and trappers
- True: the Mamanwa deity of the forest and herder of hunting animals

== Finnish mythology ==
- Mielikki, goddess of forests and the hunt
- Nyyrikki, god of the hunt
- Tapio, East Finnish forest spirit to whom men prayed before a hunt

== Georgian mythology ==
- Apsat, god of the hunt, associated with fish and birds
- Dali, goddess of the hunt, associated with horned beasts of the mountain

== Greek mythology ==
- Artemis, goddess of the hunt, associated with the moon
- Britomartis, Cretian goddess of hunting and trapping
- Heracles Kynagidas, Heracles' aspect as a hunter

== Hindu mythology ==
- Banka-Mundi, goddess of the hunt and fertility
- Bhadra, god of hunting, one of Shiva's ganas
- Rudra, Rigvedic god associated with wind or storm, and the hunt

== Hittite mythology ==
- Rundas, god of the hunt and good fortune

== Inuit Mythology ==
- Arnakuagsak, goddess responsible for ensuring the hunters were able to catch enough food and that the people remained healthy and strong
- Arnapkapfaaluk, sea goddess who inspired fear in hunters
- Nerrivik, the sea mother and patron of fishermen and hunters
- Nujalik, goddess of hunting on land
- Pinga, goddess of the hunt, fertility, and medicine
- Sedna, goddess of the sea, marine animals, and sea hunting
- Tekkeitsertok, god of hunting and master of caribou

== Japanese Mythology ==
- Takeminakata, god of wind, hunting and warfare.

== Mbuti mythology ==
- Khonvoum, supreme god of the Mbuti people in central Africa; the "great hunter"

== Mesoamerican mythology ==
- Ah Tabai, Maya god of the hunt
- Sip, a hunting god often shown with deer ears and antlers
- Yum Kaax, Maya god of the forest and the protector of game animals

== Norse mythology ==
- Skaði, a jötunn and goddess associated with bowhunting, skiing, winter, and mountains
- Ullr Norse god of hunting, mountains, archery, and skiing.

== Roman mythology ==
- Diana, goddess of the hunt, wild animals and the wilderness; the counterpart of Artemis, goddess of the hunt and wild; twin sister of Apollo, daughter of Leto and Jupiter
- Aristaeus, a minor god of bee-keeping, cheese-making, herding, olive-growing and hunting.
- Heracles Kynagidas/Hercules.
- Faunus, in addition to being a god of the wild and shepherds, was also a hunting god.

== Siberian mythology ==
- Bugady Musun, Evenki mother goddess of animals
- Hinkon, Tungusic lord of the hunt

== Slavic mythology ==
- Devana, goddess of the hunt; the Slavic equivalent of the Roman goddess Diana

== Thracian mythology ==
- Bendis, goddess of the hunt and the moon, whom the Greeks associated with Artemis.
- Thracian horseman, a hunting god on horseback.

== Yoruba mythology ==
- Ogoun or loa, the Two-Spirit orisha who presides over fire, iron, hunting, politics and war
- Oshosi, the orisha also known as the "hunter of a single arrow", also the deity of the forests.
- Yoruba mythology Etymology: from the Yoruba people in West Africa to include the countries Nigeria and Benin, foreparents to practices or Santería, Lucumí, and other religions of the Caribbean, and the Americas.

== Other ==
- Herne the Hunter, leader of the Wild Hunt.
- The Horned God, the Neopagan god of the sun, masculinity, nature, and hunting.

== See also ==
- Lord of the animals
