= Issorium =

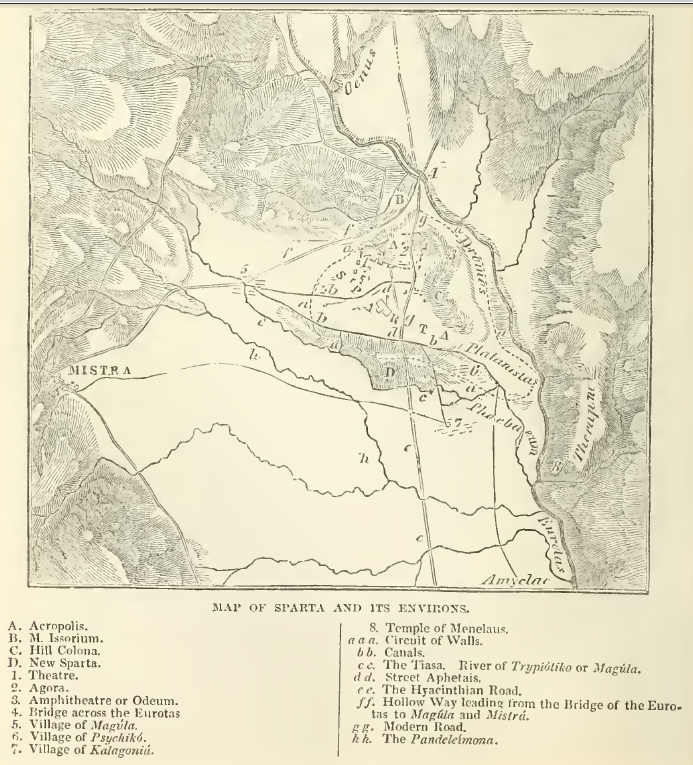
SpartaAndEnvironsMap-SmithGeography

The Issorium or Issorion (Ἰσσώριον; Issṓrion), or Mount Issorion, was a hill on the northern city border of Sparta, possibly the heights known today as Klaraki. On it was a sanctuary and temple to the goddess Artemis, in which context the goddess was surnamed Artemis Issoria. (Or, from the nearby Laconian town of Pitane, Artemis Pitanata; or Artemis Limnaea.)

During the Theban–Spartan War, circa 370 BC, the Issorium was seized by a group of Spartan mutineers; Agesilaus II broke up the conspiracy and had fifteen of the mutineers put to death.
