= Bendidia =

Ancient Greek religious celebration

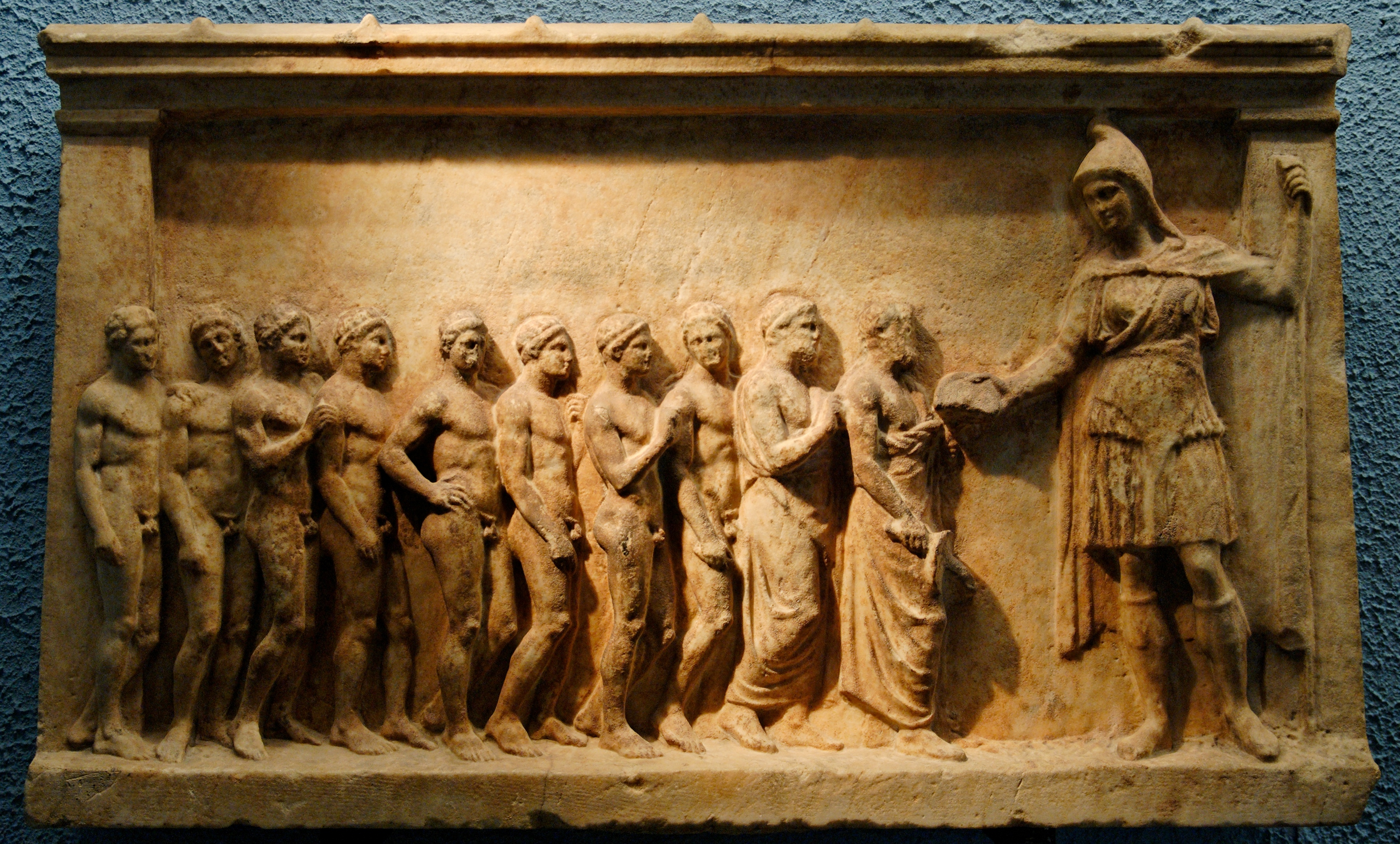
Votive relief showing Bendis (right, identified by her Phrygian cap) approached by eight athletes and two officials. The torch in the hands of the first official shows that the athletes were part of a torch relay team.

The Bendidia was an ancient Athenian festival celebrating the Thracian goddess Bendis. It was celebrated on the 19th day of the month of Thargelion (late May, in the Gregorian calendar), and was introduced in 429 BC. The festival took place in Piraeus. It was rare for ancient Athens to permit foreign residents of the city to worship their own gods; the cult of Bendis and the Bendidia is one of a few exceptions, driven by the strategic importance of Thrace to Athens at the beginning of the Peloponnesian War.

The Bendidia began with a procession to the sanctuary of Bendis. Worshippers coming from Athens processed from the Prytaneion, while the Thracian worshippers of Bendis in the Piraeus organised a separate procession, possibly organised so that it would join up with the Athenian contingent before they arrived at the sanctuary. The procession from Athens – six miles from the sanctuary – was provided with sponges and basins in which to wash, and garlands; the celebrants then ate lunch in the precinct of the sanctuary. After dark, there was a horseback relay race, with the riders passing torches between them. The horseback race was a Thracian feature of the festival, as such races at Athenian festivals were usually performed on foot, and Thracians were famous for their equestrianism, though it is unknown if similar races were also held in Thrace itself. The horse race was followed by an all-night celebration, though the precise details of the remainder of the festival are unknown. It is known that at least one sow was sacrificed.
