= Munichia (festival) =

Athenian festival of Artemis Mounychia

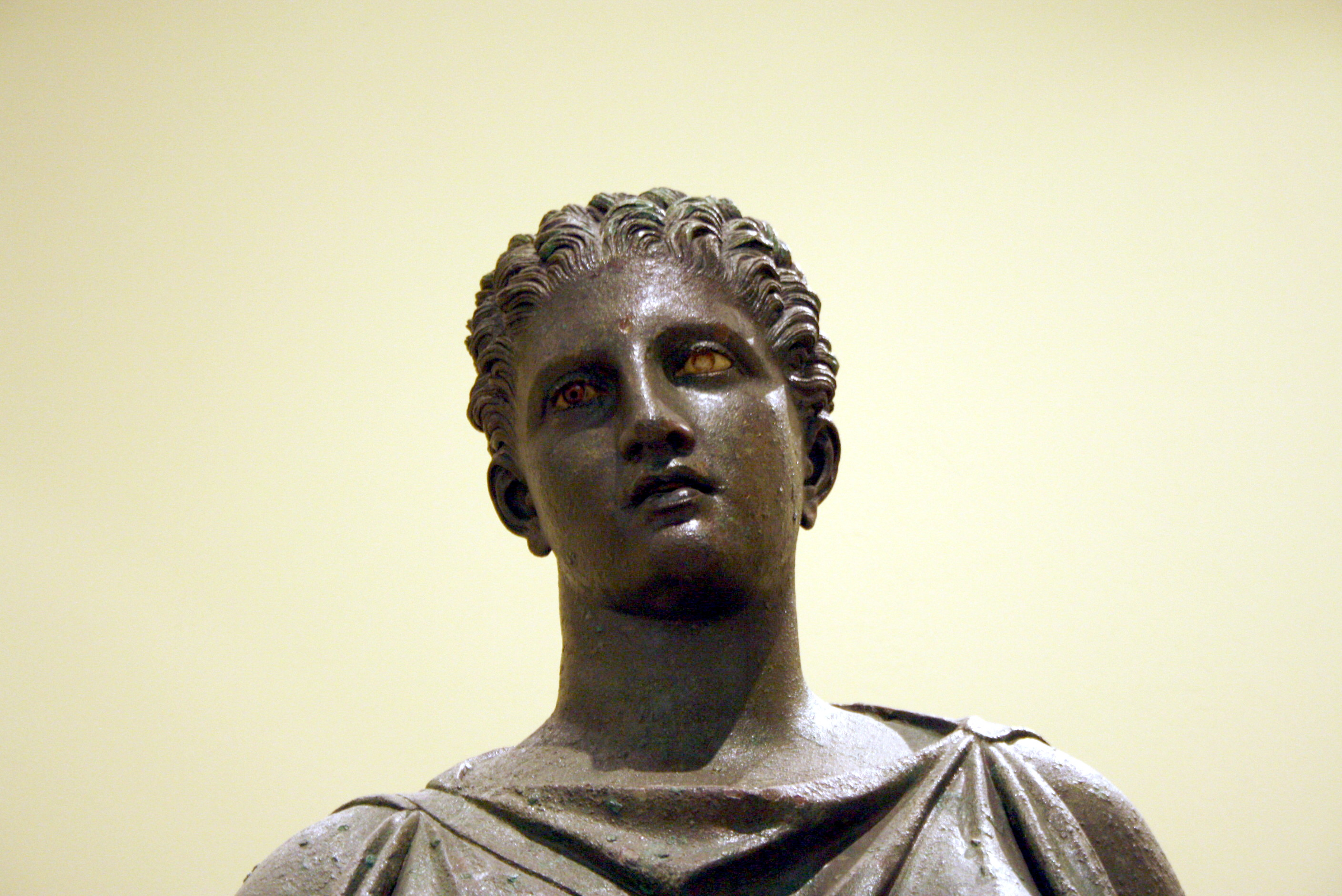
Detail from a bronze statue of Artemis in the Archaeological Museum of Piraeus (Athens). It dates from the mid-4th century and it was given to sculptor Euphranor.

The Mounichia or Mounykhia (Ancient Greek: Μουνίχια) was an ancient Athenian festival held on the 16th (full moon time) of the month Mounichion/Mounykhion(spring) of Athenian calendar in the honor of Artemis Mounichia. The surname of the goddess came from the hill of Munichia, where stood an Artemis’ temple, close to Piraeus and to the site of the Battle of Salamis. The festival was instituted to commemorate the victory of the Greek fleet over the Persians at Salamis. Cakes adorned all round with burning candles were offered to the goddess. Young girls were dressed up as bears, as for the Brauronia.

== Sources ==
- Smith, William, Dictionary of Greek and Roman Biography and Mythology, London, John Murray, 1873. OCLC 681106410. Perseus Digital Library. "Muny'chia".
