= Laphria (festival) =

Ancient Greek religious festival

Laphria (Ancient Greek: τὰ Λάφρια) was an ancient Greek religious festival in honour of the goddess Artemis, held every year in Patras. There was a sanctuary of Artemis Laphria on the acropolis of Patras. The sanctuary had an image of Artemis Laphria, that was brought there from Calydon in Aetolia after it was laid waste by Augustus.

Every year, the people held a "festival of the Laphria" in the goddess's honour "which was peculiar to their place". They made a barrier of tall logs round the altar, "still green", so that the stockade would not burn. They piled the driest wood on the altar, for kindling, and then smoothed the approaches to the pyre by laying earth on the altar steps.

On the first day, the people walked in procession of the "greatest grandeur" for the goddess. A virgin priestess brought up the rear, riding in a chariot which was drawn by tame yoked deer. The next day, living animals are sacrificed, including edible birds, boars, deer, gazelles, wolves and bears, but also fruit from trees. The altar was set on fire. Animals forced out by the first leap of the flames, or escaping at full tilt were thrown back into the fire, to their death, by those who had brought them. There was no record of anyone being injured by the animals. For a discussion on this festival see 'Ritual Dynamics in Pausanias: The Laphria' by Vinciane Pirenne-Delforge. Recent research shows that the Laphria festival may have been linked to first-fruit (aparche) rituals that took place in the Artemis Laphrion sanctuary in Kalydon during the Archaic-Classical period, possibly with participants from the surrounding regions.
