= Heracles Kynagidas =

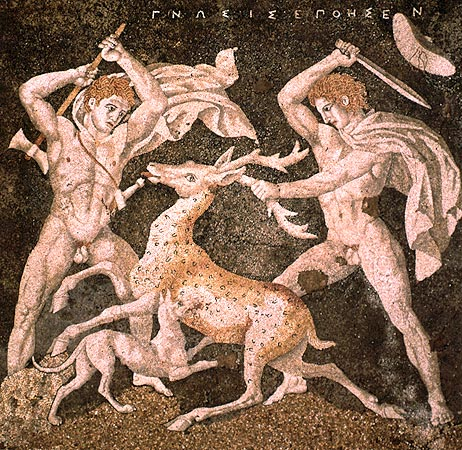
Deer hunt mosaic from Pella by Gnosis, late 4th century BC.

Heracles Kynagidas (Κυναγίδας, "The Huntsman") was an epithet used by Heracles in his aspect as the patron god of hunting and trapping in the Macedonian Kingdom, to whom hunting trophies were dedicated. Kynagidas meaning "He (who) hunts with dogs" or "He (who) leads the hunt" (Κυν (Kyn) refers to "dog" or "hound", αγ (ag) is a verb meaning "I lead" or "I conduct" and -ίδας (-ĭ́dēs) is a male patronymic suffix).

The epithet was also attributed to "Artemis Kynago" Κυναγώ, in its female form.

== Inscriptional attestations ==
Heracles Kynagidas is attested in fourteen inscriptions of various places in Macedonia from the 4th century BC to the 2nd century AD; Artemis Kynago, attested twice. The oldest inscription comes from Beroea (ca. 350-300 BC), where a sanctuary to Heracles Kynagidas has been discovered, as well as the longest text including names of hunters and priests of the god. In a Roman-era inscription from Styberra, it is also spelled Kounagidas. A dedicatory inscription by King Philip V in Pella has also been found. Respectively, the Attic form for huntsman is kynêgetês, Doric kynagetas and Mycenaean ku-na-ke-ta-i.

== Polybius ==
Polybius, who was interested in horse-riding and hunting, gives the following passage:

For as the Macedonian kings were especially eager about hunting, and the Macedonians devoted the most suitable districts to the preservation of game, these places were carefully guarded during all the war time, as they had been before, and yet had not been hunted the whole of the four years owing to the public disturbances: the consequence was that they were full of every kind of animal. But when the war was decided, Lucius Aemilius, thinking that hunting was the best training for body and courage his young soldiers could have, put the royal huntsmen under the charge of Scipio, and gave him entire authority over all matters connected with the hunting. Scipio accepted the duty, and, looking upon himself as in a quasi-royal position, devoted his whole time to this business, as long as the army remained in Macedonia after the battle of Pydna.

== See also ==
- Cynegeticus
