= Rundas =

Hittite god

- God of the hunt

Rundas is the Hittite god of the hunt and of good fortune. His emblem is a double eagle with a hare in each talon.

== See also ==
- Hittite mythology
