= Hinkon =

Among the Tungusic peoples of Siberia, Hinkon was the god of hunting and of animal life.
