= Klaraki =

Archaeological site in Greece

Klaraki κλαράκι (Greek) is a hill mentioned as an archeological excavation site in Laconia, Sparta. There are traces of a fort, tower and a city wall. Roof tiles were also found during archeological searches.

The location is mentioned as being adjoining the hill or ridges of Bambakia. The Mousga Stream is flanked in the south by the Klaraki ridges.
