= Elaphebolia =

Ancient Greek festival

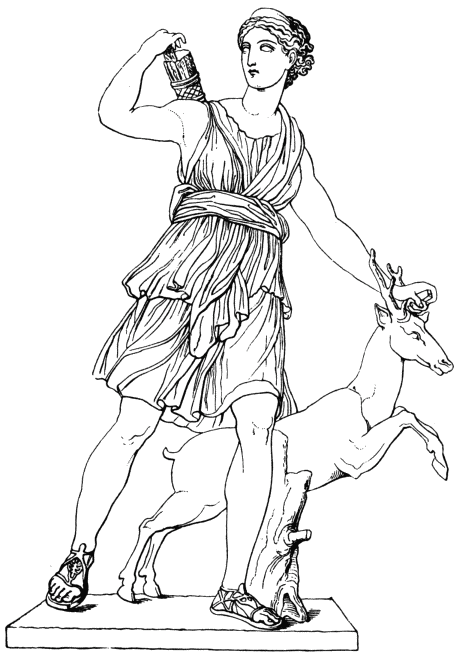
Artemis

The Elaphebolia (/ˌɛləfɪˈboʊli.ə/; Έλαφηβόλια Elaphēbolia) was an ancient Greek festival held at Athens and Phocis during the month of Elaphebolion (March/April) dedicated to Artemis Elaphebolos (deer slayer). In the town of Hyampolis in Phocis, it would have been instituted by the inhabitants to commemorate a victory against the Thessalians.

Cakes made from flour, honey, and sesame and in the shape of stags were offered to the goddess during the festival.

== See also ==
- Athenian festivals

== Sources ==
- Dictionary of Greek and Roman Antiquities edited by William Smith (1870) p.450
