= Diaulos (instrument) =

Ancient Greek wind instrument

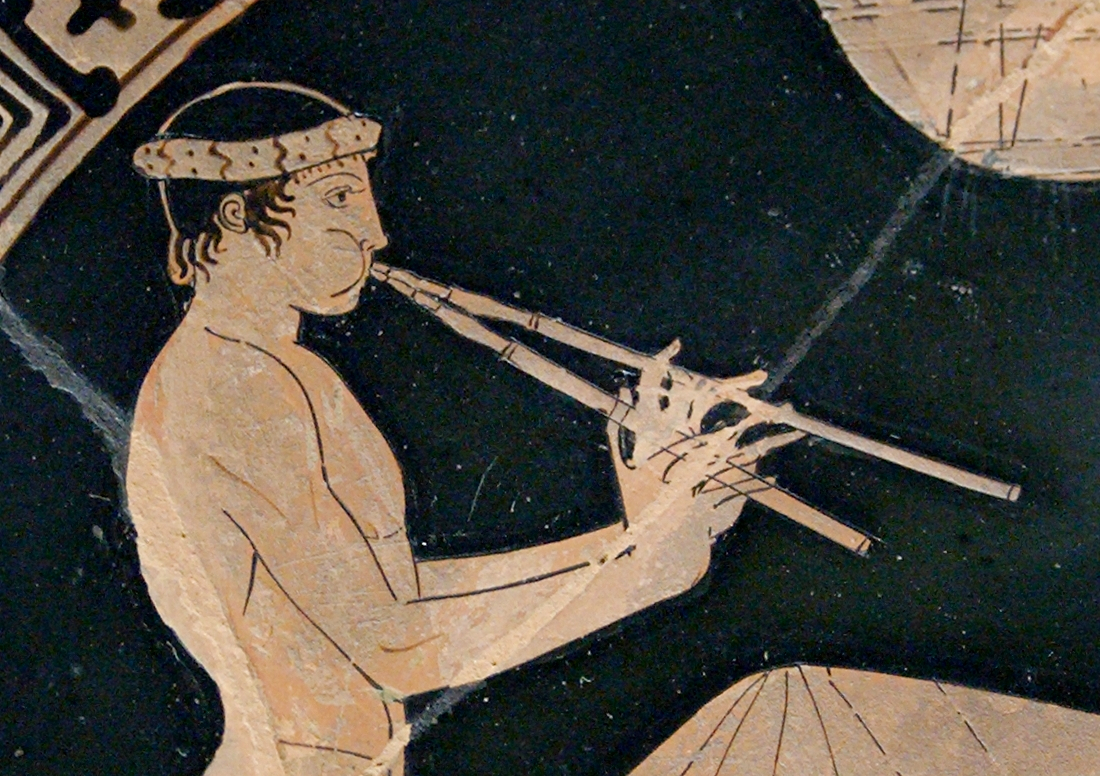

The diaulos was an ancient Greece wind instrument composed of two pipes (aulos), which were played similar to an oboe. The diaulos is basically two reed pipes put together The two pipes were connected at their base and often of different lengths. Circular breathing was sometimes used by the performer.

== See also ==
- Mijwiz
