= Apanchomene =

Epithet for the Greek goddess Artemis

Apanchomene (Ancient Greek: Ἀπαγχομένη) was in Greek mythology an epithet for the goddess Artemis that meant "the strangled goddess" or "she who hangs herself". The origin of this name is thus related by Pausanias: in the neighborhood of the town of Caphyae in Arcadia, in a place called Condylea, there was a sacred grove of Artemis Condyleatis. On one occasion when some boys were playing in this grove, they put a string around the goddess's statue, and said in their jokes they would strangle Artemis. Some of the inhabitants of Caphyae who found the boys engaged in their sport, stoned them to death.

After this occurrence, all the women of Caphyae had premature births, and all the children were brought dead into the world. This calamity did not cease until the boys were honorably buried, and an annual sacrifice to their manes was instituted in accordance with the command of an oracle of Apollo. The epithet of Condyleatis was then changed into Apanchomene.

Many modern scholars view this curious epithet as being related to Greek traditions where icons and puppets of a vegetation goddess would be hung in a tree (aiora). Classics scholar Helen King however connects the myth to beliefs about female reproductive health, and points to signs of Artemis being an asexual goddess.
