= Cult of Artemis at Brauron =

Ancient Greek cult

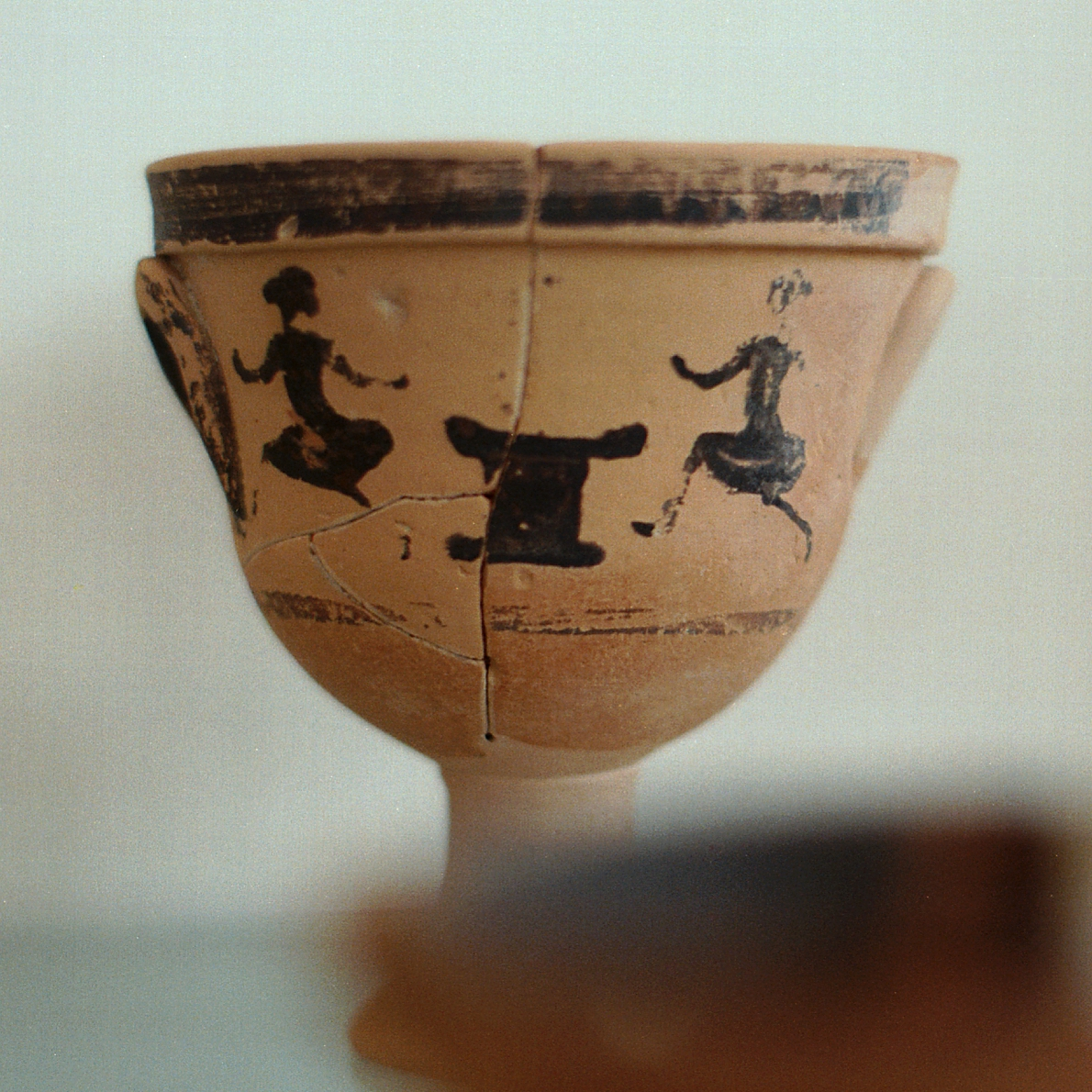
Figure painting on a small cup depicting girls prancing around an altar for Artemis

Evidence of worship of Artemis has been found all over the Ancient Greek world, with shrines dedicated to the goddess and votive offerings found in various regions. One of the most important and famous sites is in Attica at Brauron, east of Athens. Artemis is said to have presided over the biological transitions of females from before puberty to the first childbirth. Even before menstruation "young girls danced for Artemis, in some places playing the role of animals." The arkteia, where girls imitated she-bears, artktoi, was the pinnacle of the Brauronia festival. According to Euripides' Iphigenia Among the Taurians, Brauron's sanctuary to Artemis was established by Iphigenia, Agamemnon's daughter, by decree of Athena.

== Origin myths ==
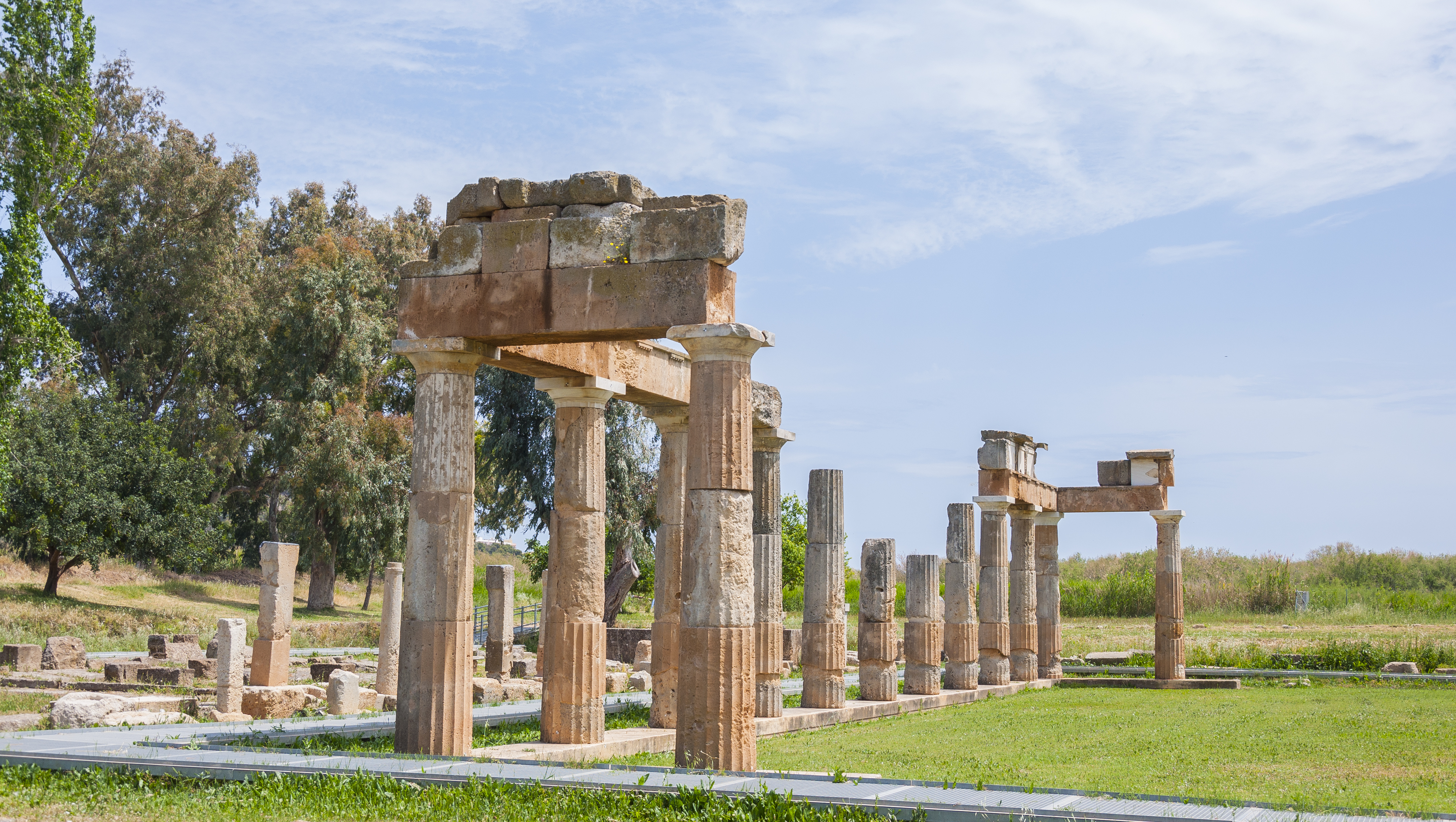
Sanctuary of Artemis at Brauron

One of the many myths surrounding the Cult of Artemis at Brauron originates with the story of Iphigenia. Euripides tells of the Greek army's stalling in Iphigenia in Aulis, where Agamemnon is told he must sacrifice his daughter to Artemis for the winds to blow again. She is not wordless in Euripides' plays, instead given long monologues first reluctant to go to her death before changing to going willingly as a sacrifice. Artemis takes pity on her and spares her, swapping her at the last moment with a hind and whisking the girl to Tauris. In a different variation, Iphigenia is gagged to prevent her cries from reaching the ears of the gods. In a final desperate act, she shrugs out of her robes and wordlessly reaches out to the elders.

In Iphigenia Among the Taurians, Athena tells Iphigenia "when you return to Greece, [you] must go to Brauron. There you will be the guardian of the keys of the Shrine of Artemis. At Brauron you will die and be buried there. And each year, in honor of women who die in childbirth, an offering of finespun cloth will be sacrificed and given in your honor." The cloth sacrificed can be understood as Iphigenia's shed robes. The brauronia, the festival celebrating Artemis at Brauron, included celebrations of girls dressed as bears shedding their skin, an act which is significant as the fulfillment of a bear’s career. Iphigenia makes the original sacrifice and the “bears” continue the ritual by shedding their saffron robes.

The other origin is more simple. Two Athenian men killed a bear sacred to Artemis after it scratched their younger sister. The goddess responded “by sending a plague that would cease only if the Athenians would consecrate their daughters to her, the ‘bear Artemis’, every five years.” Artemis was worshipped as the great she-bear and the girls, who were required to undergo a period of ritual ‘wildness' before puberty, were her image, the arktoi, and often wore bear masks in rituals.

== The wrath of Artemis ==
=== Patrai ===
Artemis needed to be appeased or the results could be disastrous. "One legend describes how the polis of Patrai was punished with plague (loimos) and famine (limos) because a priestess of Artemis Triklaria entertained her lover in the sanctuary. The punishment was so severe because the young priestess had committed a triple violation: violation of the standards of purity for the sanctuary, violation of the requirements of sexual purity for service to Artemis, and, because the priestess represented all the young women of the community, violation of the social requirement that young women be kept from sexual experience until the time of marriage." The young participants in the Brauronia were expected to act in a certain way to stay in good favor with Artemis. "The anger of Artemis was always a risk. One commentator describes the girls celebrating the arkteia at Brauron as ‘soothing’ or ‘appeasing’ the goddess… Another says that girls had to ‘placate the goddess for their virginity (parthenia), so that they would not be the object of revenge from her."

=== Athens ===
According to Suda, "the reason that young girls at Athens had to play the bear was because a wild bear used to come to the deme of Phlauidoi" (this is a mistake, it should be Philaidae which is the deme nearest to Brauron) "and spend time there; and it became tamed. A virgin was playing with it and, when the girl began acting recklessly, the bear was provoked and scratched the virgin. Her brothers were angered and speared the bear and because of this a plague fell upon Athens. The Athenians consulted the oracle and they told that there would be a release from the plague if they compelled their virgins to play the bear, as blood price for the death of the animal. The Athenians decreed that no virgin might be given in marriage to a man if she had not previously played the bear for Artemis."

== Religious practices ==
=== Participants ===
As soon as I was 7 I was an arrhephoros (sacred basket carrier). Then at 10 I was an aletris (miller of corn) for the foundress, and shedding my saffron robe I was an arktos (bear) at the Brauronia. —Aristophanes Lysistrata, lines 641-647.

The stages described in this excerpt have been attributed the rituals of the Cult of Artemis at Brauron. Though some sources disagree, it is most commonly accepted that the participants were between the ages of 5 and 10, as in Lysistrata. The wealth of archeological artifacts documenting this festival in the form of painted vases and tablets suggests it was widely known; evidence suggests that the "girls that took part in the Athenian Braurania were a 'select few chosen from the best families'" to represent the entire community. French historian Pierre Vidal-Naquet said of the cult practices, "The myth is not difficult to explain: in exchange for the very advance of culture implied by the killing of wild animals, an advance for which men are responsible, the girls are obliged before marriage – indeed before puberty – to undergo a period of ritual 'wildness'."

=== Offerings ===
There are also many offerings found at Artemis’ shrines throughout the Greek world. At Brauron in particular the offerings include, “implements such as spindles, spindle whorls, loom weights and epinetra…The textiles and garments actually donated survive only in the list preserved on stone…” At Brauron there have also been found certain vase fragments depicting what is certainly initiates and participants in the arkteia.

=== Importance of temple locations ===
Hughes notes that "the etymology of the name Artemis would be ark-temnis, “bear-sanctuary,” or more fully paraphrased, “she who establishes (or protects) the bear sanctuary.” Such sanctuaries were commonly and most characteristically groves of trees near water. The placement and structure of the temple at Brauron carried significance because its features were often included in the worship of Artemis. Besides Brauron, many other temples devoted to Artemis worship existed.

Cole suggests that “the theme that unites the most distinctive sites of Artemis is the idea of dangerous or threatened passage. She was particularly associated with places of narrow access…[which were] sensitive places necessary for a city’s defense but also the places most vulnerable to enemy penetration.” Since she was associated with territorial boundaries, defensive positions, and the wilderness, many of the sanctuaries were located at the periphery or near water. Whether located on a mountain, marshy area, or near a river, water was often a focal point in the sanctuaries. Brauron was located where a river flowed into the Aegean Sea. The structure of the temple highlighted the nearby river because water was essential to the rituals performed in honor of Artemis.

== Festivals and rituals ==
There is archeological evidence for settlement in the Brauron area as far back as the early Bronze Age, and evidence of cultic activity by 900-700 BCE. It is possible that the festival at Brauron was an annual event before transitioning to every four years. During the festival young girls, and occasionally young boys, would gather to celebrate Artemis as the great she-bear. They did this by assuming the image of bears themselves and performing certain rituals. Vases depict images of races and dancing to honor the goddess. The dance, also called the "arkteia", was made up of slow, solemn steps meant to imitate the movements of a bear and was performed to a tune from a diaulos (double flute). The young girls also carried baskets of figs. Little is known about what each stage of the ritual meant, but it is understood that they each symbolized a gesture of devotion to Artemis in return for her protection over the young and guidance on their way to maturity. Early on the participants wore actual bear skins, but by the 5th century BC bears had become scarce. The skins were substituted with krokoton. These short, saffron-yellow chiton dresses were meant to symbolize the bear skins and were "shed" during the final ritual to symbolize the participant's maturation.

== Effects on Greek cultural attitudes ==
The worship of Artemis at Brauron, and throughout ancient Greece, had several effects on Classical society. Two have already been noted: the need to appease Artemis affected the women participants and temples of Artemis were consciously placed in defensive or contested locations. Another, the dance of Arkteia, dealt in part with the wilderness aspect of Artemis. The Arkteia marked the beginning of the transition of a parthenos to a gyne, which was completed at marriage.

A major part of the Arkteia was the presence of animal symbolism. The symbolism served to give the children (aged five to ten years old, ideally ten) an introduction to environmental education and concern for nature. This is due in large part to Artemis’s reputation as a protector of wildlife. She was a defender of wild animals, and was believed to punish harshly those who killed them for objectionable reasons. She was also identified with wildlife, and many areas were designated as sanctuaries and refuges where the hunting or killing of wildlife was either prohibited or restricted. Artemis was symbolic of ethical principles of hunting and wildlife management. These principles stemmed from the belief of primitive hunters and gatherers who believed that living things were sentient, intelligent beings, deserving of respect. Due to these factors, when embarking on hunts, hunters needed to be mindful of the respect and reverence due to nature and wildlife.

Thanks in large part to Greek beliefs in regards to Artemis, large sections of the Greek landscape were preserved for many years. For this reason, Artemis is seen as an early pioneer and patroness of environmental education and the worship of the virgin goddess is in large part responsible for many of the conservation efforts of Classical Greece.

== Sources ==
- Blundell, Sue; Williamson, Margaret (1998). The Sacred and the Feminine in Ancient Greece. New York: Routledge.
- Burkert, Walter (1985). Greek Religion. Basil Blackwell Publisher. (Original work published 1977)
- Cole, Susan Guettel (2004). Landscapes, Gender, and Ritual Space: The Ancient Greek Experience. Berkeley: University of California Press. pp. 178–225.
- Euripides (1997). Iphigenia Among the Taurians (N. Rudall, Trans.). Ivan R. Dee. (Original work published 414-412 BCE)
- Euripides (2017). Iphigenia at Aulis (C. Collard & J. Morwood, Trans.). Liverpool University Press. (Original work published 408-406 BCE)
- Harris, Stephen L.; Platzner, Gloria (2004). Classical Mythology: Images and Insights. New York: The McGraw-Hill Companies, Inc.
- Hughes, J. Donald (October 1990). "Artemis: Goddess of Conservation". Forest & Conservation History. 34 (4). Forest History Society and American Society for Environmental History: 191–197. doi:10.2307/3983705. JSTOR 3983705. S2CID 191374902.
- Osborne, Robin (1989). "Review: Girls' Transitions in Attic Ritual and Art". The Classical Review. 39 (2). Cambridge University Press: 272–274. doi:10.1017/S0009840X00271758. S2CID 162820009.
- Stinton, T. C. W. (1976). "Iphigeneia and the Bears of Brauron". The Classical Quarterly. 26 (1). Cambridge University Press: 11–13. doi:10.1017/S0009838800033760. S2CID 170818591.
- Walbank, Michael (1981). "Artemis Bear-Leader". The Classical Quarterly. 31 (2). Cambridge University Press: 276–281. doi:10.1017/S0009838800009587. S2CID 170405605.
- Vidal-Naquet, Pierre (1981). Formes de Pensées et Formes de Société dans le Monde Grec. Paris: Francois Maspero. p. 196.
