= Bendis =

Thracian lunar goddess

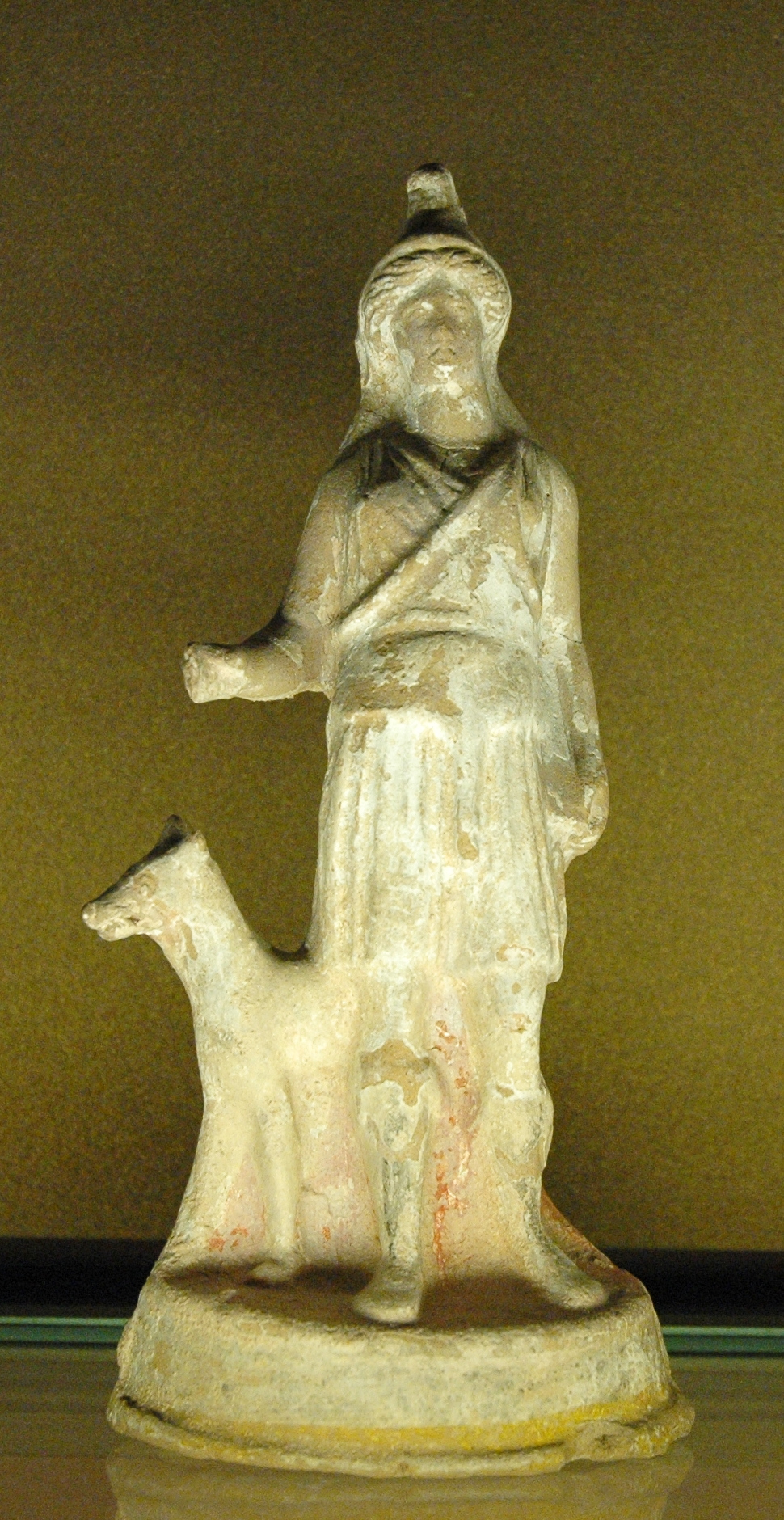
Artemis Bendis, moulded terracotta figurine, perhaps from Tanagra, c. 350 BC (Louvre)

Bendis (Ancient Greek: Βένδις) was a Thracian goddess associated with hunting and the moon. Worship of the goddess seems to have been introduced into Attica around 430 BC. In Athens, Bendis was identified with the goddess Artemis, but she had a separate temple at Piraeus, near the temple of Artemis, and was a distinct goddess. She was a huntress, like Artemis, but was often accompanied by dancing satyrs and maenads, as represented on a fifth-century red-figure stemless cup at Verona.

== Etymology ==
The deity's name, Bendis, is thought to derive from a Proto-Indo-European stem *bʰendʰ-, meaning 'to bind, unite, combine'.

== Worship ==
By a decree of the Oracle of Dodona, which required the Athenians to grant land for a shrine or temple, her cult was introduced into Attica by immigrant Thracian residents, and, though Thracian and Athenian processions remained separate, both cult and festival became so popular that in Plato's time (c. 429–413 BC) its festivities were naturalized as an official ceremonial of the city-state, called the Bendideia (Βενδίδεια). Among the events were night-time torch-races on horseback, mentioned in Plato's Republic, 328:

"You haven't heard that there is to be a torchlight race this evening on horseback in honour of the Goddess?" "On horseback?" said I. "That is a new idea. Will they carry torches and pass them along to one another as they race with the horses, or how do you mean?" "That's the way of it," said Polemarchus, "and, besides, there is to be a night festival which will be worth seeing."

In Piraeus there was a temple of the goddess which was called the Bendidia / Bendideion (Βενδίδειον).

A red-figure skyphos, now at Tübingen University, of c. 440–430, seems to commemorate the arrival of the newly authorized cult: it shows Themis (representing traditional Athenian customs) and a booted and cloaked Bendis, who wears a Thracian fox-skin cap.

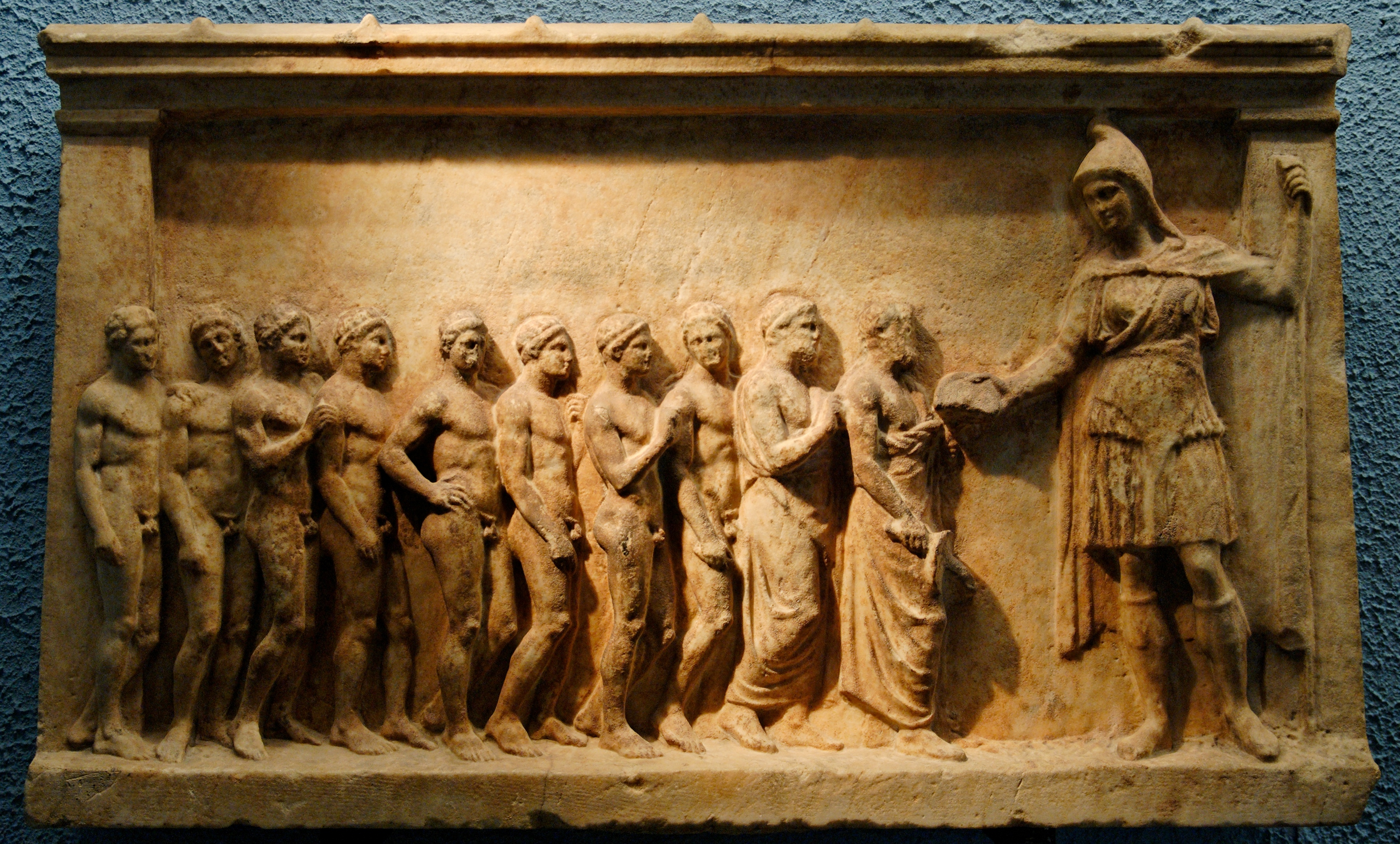
Votive stele (British Museum). The goddess is shown on a larger scale than her mortal worshippers.

A small marble votive stele of Bendis, c. 400–375 BC, found at Piraeus, (pictured left) shows the goddess and her worshippers in bas-relief. The image shows that the Thracian goddess has been strongly influenced by Athenian conceptions of Artemis: Bendis wears a short chiton like Artemis, but with an Asiatic snug-sleeved undergarment. She is wrapped in an animal skin like Artemis and has a spear, but has a hooded Thracian mantle, fastened with a brooch. She wears high boots. In the fourth century BC terracotta figurine (pictured right) she is similarly attired and once carried a (wooden?) spear.

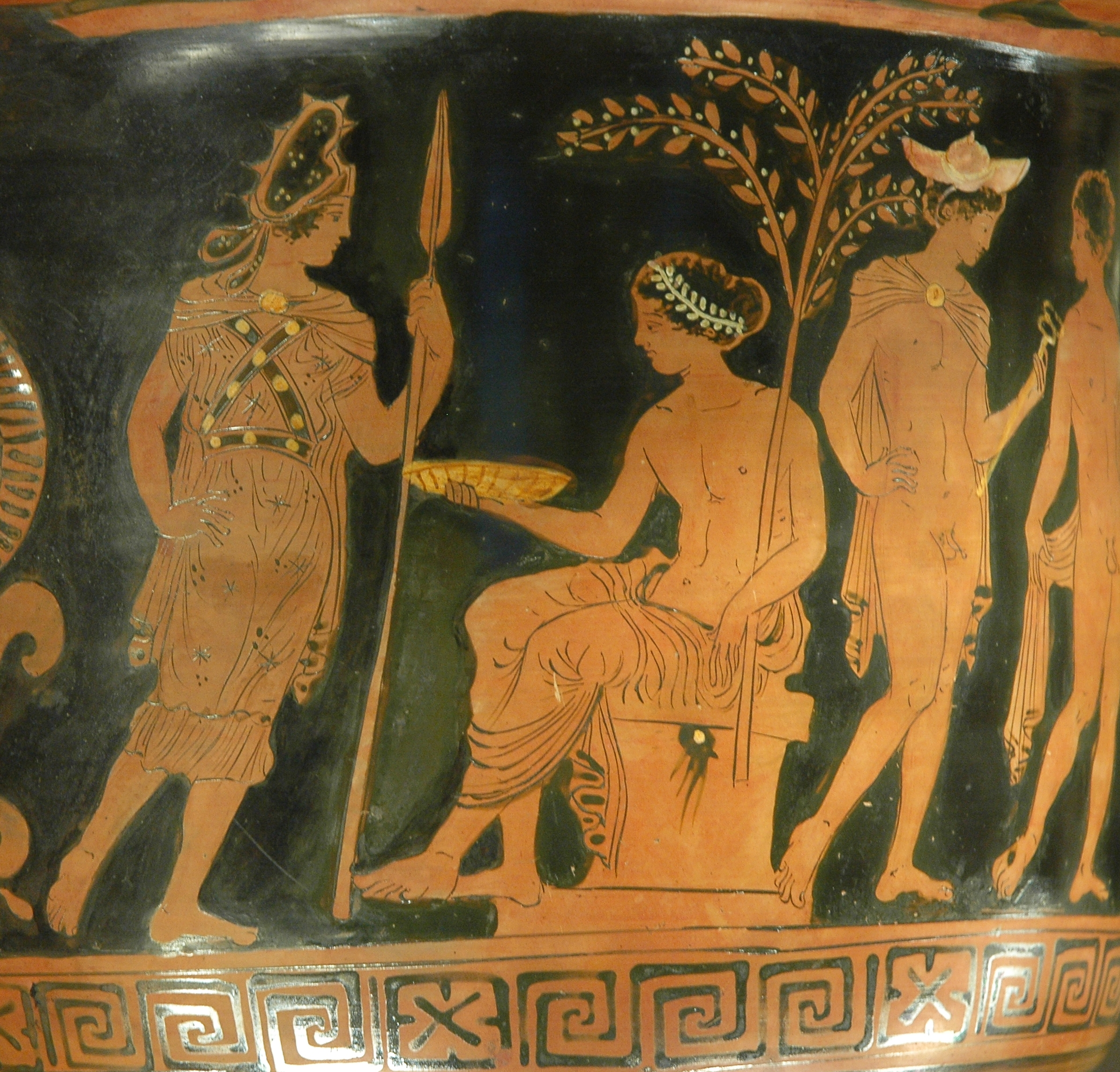
Bendis in her Thracian cap approaches a seated Apollo. Red-figure bell-shaped krater by the Bendis Painter, c. 380–370 BC

Elsewhere in Greece, the cult of Bendis did not catch on.

Just as in all other respects the Athenians continue to be hospitable to things foreign, so also in their worship of the gods; for they welcomed so many of the foreign rites that they were ridiculed for it by comic writers; and among these were the Thracian and Phrygian rites. (Strabo, Geography (1st century AD), 10.3.18)

The "Phrygian rites" Strabo mentioned referred to the cult of Cybele that was also welcomed to Athens in the 5th century.

== Related deities ==
The Athenians may have blended the cult of Bendis with the equally Dionysiac Thracian revels of Kotys, mentioned by Aeschylus and other ancient writers. Archaic female cult figures unearthed in Thrace (modern-day Bulgaria) have also been identified with Bendis.

Bendida Peak on Trinity Peninsula in Antarctica is named after the goddess.

== Sources ==
- "Bendis", William Smith (ed.) Dictionary of Greek and Roman Biography and Mythology. 1. Boston: Little, Brown & Co., 1867.
- "Bendis (Thracian goddess)", The Editors. Encyclopedia Britannica, 20 Jul. 1998. Accessed 24 January 2022.
